= List of Harvard University people =

This list of Harvard University alumni includes notable graduates, professors, and administrators affiliated with Harvard University. For a list of notable non-graduates of Harvard, see the list of Harvard University non-graduate alumni. For a list of Harvard's presidents, see President of Harvard University.

Eight presidents of the United States have graduated from Harvard University: John Adams, John Quincy Adams, Rutherford B. Hayes, John F. Kennedy, Franklin Delano Roosevelt, Theodore Roosevelt, George W. Bush, and Barack Obama. Bush graduated from Harvard Business School, Hayes and Obama from Harvard Law School, and the others from Harvard College.

Over 150 Nobel Prize winners have been associated with the university as alumni, researchers or faculty.

== Nobel laureates ==
Name	Class year	Notability	Reference(s)
Philip W. Anderson (1923–2020)	College 1943; PhD 1949	Physicist; Nobel Prize in Physics winner (1977)	
Christian B. Anfinsen (1916–1995)	PhD 1943	Biochemist; Nobel Prize in Chemistry winner (1972)	
Abhijit Banerjee (born 1961)	PhD 1988	Economist; Nobel Memorial Prize in Economic Sciences winner (2019)	
J. Michael Bishop (born 1936)	PhD 1962	Immunology; Nobel Prize in Physiology or Medicine winner (1989)	
Percy W. Bridgman (1882–1961)	College 1904; A.M. 1905; PhD 1908; professor	Physicist; Nobel Prize in Physics winner (1946)	
Ralph Bunche (1904–1971)	A.M. 1928; PhD 1934	Diplomat; Nobel Peace Prize winner (1950)	
Mario Capecchi (born 1937)	PhD 1967	Geneticist; Nobel Prize in Physiology or Medicine winner (2007)	
Martin Chalfie (born 1947)	College 1969, PhD 1979	Chemist; Nobel Prize in Chemistry winner (2008)	
Donald J. Cram (1919–2001)	PhD 1947	Chemist; Nobel Prize in Chemistry winner (1987)	
Karl Deisseroth (born 1971)	College 1972	Bioengineer; Nobel Prize in Physiology or Medicine winner (2026)	
Edward Adelbert Doisy (1893–1986)	PhD 1920	Biochemist; Nobel Prize in Physiology or Medicine winner (1943)	
T. S. Eliot (1888–1965)	College 1909; A.M. 1910; PhD (not conferred) 1914	Poet; Nobel Prize in Literature winner (1948)	
John Franklin Enders (1897–1985)	PhD 1930	Scientist; Nobel Prize in Physiology or Medicine winner (1954)	
Daniel Carleton Gajdusek (1923–2008)	PhD 1946	Physician, Nobel Prize in Physiology or Medicine winner (1976)	
Walter Gilbert (born 1932)	College 1953; professor	Molecular biologist; Nobel Prize in Chemistry winner (1980)	
Sheldon Glashow (born 1932)	PhD 1959; professor	Physicist; Nobel Prize in Physics winner (1979)	
Roy J. Glauber (1925–2018)	College 1946; PhD 1949; professor	Physicist; Nobel Prize in Physics winner (2005)	
Al Gore (born 1948)	College 1969	Vice president of the United States; global climate change activist; Nobel Peace Prize winner (2007)	
Dudley R. Herschbach (born 1932)	A.M. 1956; PhD 1958; professor	Chemist; Nobel Prize in Chemistry winner (1986)	
George H. Hitchings (1905–1998)	PhD 1933	Physician, Nobel Prize in Physiology or Medicine winner (1988)	
Roald Hoffman (born 1937)	PhD 1962	Chemist; Nobel Prize in Chemistry winner (1981)	
H. Robert Horvitz (born 1947)	A.M. 1972; PhD 1974	Biologist; Nobel Prize in Physiology or Medicine winner (2002)	
Charles Brenton Huggins (1901–1997)	Medical 1924	Physician; Nobel Prize in Physiology or Medicine winner (1941)	
Eric Kandel (born 1929)	College 1948	Neuropsychiatry; Nobel Prize in Physiology or Medicine winner (2000)	
Jerome Karle (1918–2013)	A.M. 1938	Physical chemist; Nobel Prize in Chemistry winner (1985)	
Martin Karplus (born 1930)	College 1950	Chemist; Nobel Prize in Chemistry winner (2013)	
Henry Kissinger (1923–2023)	College 1950, PhD 1954	Political scientist; Nobel Peace Prize winner (1973)	
William S. Knowles (1917–2012)	College 1939	Chemist; Nobel Prize in Chemistry winner (2001)	
Walter Kohn (1923–2016)	PhD 1948	Theoretical physics; Nobel Prize in Chemistry winner (1998)	
Roger D. Kornberg (born 1947)	College 1967	Nobel Prize in Chemistry winner (2006)	
Michael Kremer (born 1964)	College 1985, PhD 1992	Economist; Nobel Memorial Prize in Economic Sciences winner (2019)	
Eric Maskin (born 1950)	College 1972; A.M. 1974; PhD 1976	Nobel Prize in Economics winner (2007)	
David Morris Lee (born 1931)	College 1952	Physicist; Nobel Prize in Physics (1996)	
Craig Mello (born 1960)	PhD 1962	Biologist; Nobel Prize in Physiology or Medicine winner (2006)	
Merton Miller (1923–2000)	College 1944	Economist; Nobel Prize in Economics winner (1990)	
George Minot (1885–1950)	College 1908; Medical 1912	Nobel Prize in Physiology or Medicine winner (1934)	
David A. Morse (1907–1990)	Law 1932	Nobel Peace Prize winner (1969)	
Ben Roy Mottelson (1926–2022)	PhD 1950	Physicist; Nobel Prize in Physics winner (1975)	
William P. Murphy (1892–1987)	Medical 1922	Physician, Nobel Prize in Physiology or Medicine winner (1934)	
Joseph E. Murray (1919–2012)	Medical 1943	Surgeon; Nobel Prize in Physiology or Medicine winner (1990)	
Roger Myerson (born 1951)	College 1973, PhD 1976	Economist; Nobel Memorial Prize in Economic Sciences winner (2007)	
Barack Obama (born 1961)	Law 1991	President of the United States; Nobel Peace Prize winner (2009)	
Bertil Ohlin (1899–1979)	A.M. 1923	Economist; Nobel Memorial Prize in Economic Sciences winner (1977)	
Saul Perlmutter (born 1959)	College 1981	Astrophysics; Nobel Prize in Physics winner (2011)	
Navi Pillay (born 1941)	LLM 1982, JSD 1988	Law; Nobel Prize in Peace (2026)	
Hugh David Politzer (born 1949)	PhD 1974	Physicist; Nobel Prize in Physics (2004)	
Edward Mills Purcell (1912–1997)	A.M.; PhD; professor	Physicist; Nobel Prize in Physics winner (1952)	
Theodore W. Richards (1868–1928)	PhD 1888; professor	Chemist; Nobel Prize in Chemistry winner (1914)	
Adam Riess (born 1969)	PhD 1996	Astrophysics; Nobel Prize in Physics winner (2011)	
Frederick C. Robbins (1916–2003)	Medical 1940	Nobel Prize in Physiology or Medicine winner (1954)	
Theodore Roosevelt (1858–1919)	College 1880	President of the United States; Nobel Peace Prize winner (1906)	
James Rothman (born 1950)	PhD, 1976	Cell biologist; Nobel Prize in Physiology or Medicine winner (2013)	
Paul Samuelson (1915–2009)	A.M. 1936; PhD 1941	Economist; Nobel Prize in Economics winner (1970)	
Juan Manuel Santos (born 1951)	HKS 1981	President of Colombia; Nobel Peace Prize winner (2016)	
Thomas J. Sargent (born 1943)	PhD 1968	Economist; Nobel Memorial Prize in Economic Sciences winner (2011)	
Thomas Schelling (1921–2016)	PhD 1951	Economist; Nobel Memorial Prize in Economic Sciences winner (2005)	
Brian Schmidt (born 1967)	PhD 1993	Astrophysics; Nobel Prize in Physics winner (2011)	
Richard R. Schrock (born 1945)	PhD 1971	Chemist; Nobel Prize in Chemistry (2005)	
Gregg L. Semenza (born 1956)	College 1978	Oncology; Nobel Prize in Physiology or Medicine winner (2019)	
Lloyd Shapley (1923–2016)	College 1948	Economist; Nobel Prize in Economics winner (2012)	
Christopher A. Sims (born 1942)	College 1963 PhD 1968	Economist; Nobel Memorial Prize in Economic Sciences winner (2011)	
Ellen Johnson Sirleaf (born 1938)	HKS 1971	President of Liberia; Nobel Peace Prize winner (2011)	
George Smith (born 1941)	PhD 1970	Biologist; Nobel Prize in Chemistry (2018)	
Vernon L. Smith (born 1927)	PhD 1955	Economist; Nobel Prize in Economics winner (2002)	
George Davis Snell (1903–1996)	PhD 1930	Geneticist; Nobel Prize in Physiology or Medicine winner (1980)	
Robert M. Solow (1924–2023)	College 1947; A.M. 1949; PhD 1951	Economist; Nobel Prize in Economics winner (1987)	
A. Michael Spence (born 1943)	PhD 1972	Economist; Nobel Prize in Economics winner (2001)	
William Howard Stein (1911–1980)	College 1933	Biochemist; Nobel Prize in Chemistry winner (1972)	
Ralph M. Steinman (1943–2011)	PhD 1968	Immunology; Nobel Prize in Physiology or Medicine winner (2011)	
Thomas A. Steitz (1940–2018)	PhD 1966	Biochemist; Nobel Prize in Chemistry winner (2009)	
James B. Sumner (1887–1955)	College 1910; PhD 1914	Chemist; Nobel Prize in Chemistry winner (1946)	
Joseph Hooton Taylor Jr. (born 1941)	PhD 1968	Astrophysics; Nobel Prize in Physics winner (1993)	
E. Donnall Thomas (1920–2012)	MD 1946	Physician, Nobel Prize in Physiology or Medicine winner (1990)	
James Tobin (1918–2002)	College 1939; A.M. 1940	Economist; Nobel Prize in Economics winner (1981)	
Roger Y. Tsien (1952–2016)	College 1972	Biochemist; Nobel Prize in Chemistry winner (2008)	
Thomas H. Weller (1915–2008)	PhD 1940	Virologist; Nobel Prize in Physiology or Medicine winner (1954)	
Kenneth G. Wilson (1936–2013)	College 1956	Physicist; Nobel Prize in Physics winner (1956)	
John H. van Vleck (1899–1980)	PhD 1922; professor	Physicist; Nobel Prize in Physics winner (1977)	
Harold E. Varmus (born 1939)	A.M. 1962	Scientist; Nobel Prize in Physiology or Medicine winner (1989)	
David J. Wineland (born 1944)	PhD 1970	Scientist; Nobel Prize in Physics winner (2012)	

== Pulitzer Prize winners ==
Name	Class year	Notability	Reference(s)
Henry Adams (1838–1918)	College 1858; professor	Historian, novelist	
John Coolidge Adams (born 1947)	College 1969; A.M. 1971	Composer	
James Agee (1909–1955)	College 1932	Novelist, screenwriter	
Liaquat Ahamed (born 1952)	M.A.	Author	
Conrad Aiken (1889–1973)	College 1912	Poet, writer	
John Ashbery (1927–2017)	College 1949	Poet	
Brooks Atkinson (1894–1984)	College 1917	Theater critic	
Bernard Bailyn (1922–2020)	A.M. 1947; PhD 1953; professor 1961	Historian	
Walter Jackson Bate (1918–1999)	College 1939	Historian	
James Phinney Baxter III (1893–1975)	PhD 1926	Historian	
William M. Beecher (born 1933)	College	Journalist	
Samuel Flagg Bemis (1891–1973)	PhD 1916	Historian	
Frank Bidart (born 1939)	A.M. 1967	Poet	
Herbert P. Bix (born 1938)	PhD	Historian	
Daniel J. Boorstin (1914–2004)	College 1934	Historian, Librarian of Congress	
Robert Boyd (1928–2019)	College 1949	Journalist	
Van Wyck Brooks (1886–1963)	College 1908	Historian	
Paul Herman Buck (1899–1978)	M.A. 1924	Historian	
Robert Campbell (born 1937)	College 1958, Graduate School of Design 1967	Boston Globe architecture critic	
Elliott Carter (1908–2012)	College 1932	Composer	
Alfred D. Chandler Jr. (1918–2007)	College 1940; professor	Historian	
Edward Channing (1856–1931)	College 1878	Historian	
Robert Coles (1929-2026)	College 1950	Author	
Holland Cotter (born 1947)	College 1970	Journalist	
Merle Curti (1897–1996)	College 1920	Historian	
William O. Dapping (1880–1969)	B.A. 1905	Journalist	
David Brion Davis (1927–2019)	PhD 1955	Historian	
Bernard DeVoto (1897–1955)	College 1920	Historian	
Jared Diamond (born 1937)	College 1958	Author, biologist	
John W. Dower (born 1938)	PhD 1972	Historian	
Du Yun (born 1977)	PhD	Composer	
Richard Eder (1932–2014)	College 1954	Los Angeles Times journalist	
Caroline Elkins (born 1969)	PhD 2001	Historian	
Will Englund (born 1953)	College 1975	Journalist	
David Fahrenthold (born 1978)	College 2000	Journalist	
Susan Faludi (born 1959)	College 1981	Author, journalist	
Mark Feeney (born 1957)	College 1979	Boston Globe journalist	
Herbert Feis (1893–1972)	College 1916	Historian	
James Thomas Flexner (1908–2003)	College 1926	Historian	
Caroline Fraser	PhD 1987	Biographer	
Sydney P. Freedberg	College 1976	Journalist	
Alix M. Freedman (born 1957)	College 1979	Journalist	
Daniel Golden (born 1957)	College 1978	Journalist	
Ellen Goodman (born 1941)	Radcliffe 1963	Boston Globe columnist	
Doris Kearns Goodwin (born 1943)	PhD 1968	Historian, author	
Annette Gordon-Reed (born 1958)	Law 1984; professor	Historian	
Linda Greenhouse (born 1947)	Radcliffe 1968	New York Times journalist	
Richard Grozier (1887–1946)	College 1909	Editor	
Cornelia Grumman (born 1963)	KSG 1989	Journalist	
David Halberstam (1934–2007)	College 1955	Author	
Oscar Handlin (1915–2011)	M.A. 1935	Historian	
Marcus Lee Hansen (1892–1938)	PhD 1928	Historian	
Laurie Hays	College 1979	Journalist	
Tim Hays (1907–2011)	Law 1942	Publisher	
John Harbison (born 1938)	College 1960	Composer	
Robert Hillyer (1895–1961)	College 1917	Poet	
Daniel Walker Howe (born 1937)	College 1959	Journalist	
Mark Antony De Wolfe Howe (1864–1960)	A.M. 1888	Author	
Henry James (1879–1947)	College 1899	Biographer	
Joseph Kahn (born 1964)	College 1987	Journalist	
Michael Kammen (1936–2013)	PhD 1964	Historian	
Peter R. Kann (born 1942)	College	Journalist	
Justin Kaplan (1925–2014)	College 1944	Biographer	
Stanley Karnow (1925–2013)	College 1947	Journalist	
John F. Kennedy (1917–1963)	College 1940	U.S. president	
Tracy Kidder (born 1945)	College 1967	Author	
Edward M. Kingsbury (1854–1946)	College 1875	Historian	
Charles Krauthammer (1950–2018)	Medical 1975	Washington Post columnist	
Nicholas D. Kristof (born 1959)	College 1981	New York Times columnist	
Stanley Kunitz (1905–2006)	College 1926; A.M. 1927	Poet, U.S. Poet Laureate	
Oliver La Farge (1901–1963)	College 1924	Author	
Oliver Larkin (1896–1970)	College 1918	Art historian	
Edward J. Larson (born 1953)	Law 1979	Historian	
William L. Laurence (1888–1977)	Law	Journalist	
Joseph Lelyveld (born 1937)	College 1958	Journalist	
Anthony Lewis (1927–2013)	College 1948	New York Times columnist	
R. W. B. Lewis (1917–2002)	College 1939	Biographer	
Walter Lippmann (1889–1974)	College 1910	Journalist	
J. Anthony Lukas (1933–1997)	College 1955	Journalist	
Robert Lowell (1917–1977)	Dropped out	Poet	
John E. Mack (1929–2004)	Medical 1955	Psychiatrist, writer, professor at Harvard University School of Medicine	
Archibald MacLeish (1892–1982)	Law 1919	Poet, writer	
John P. Marquand (1893–1960)	College 1915	Novelist	
Megan Marshall (born 1954)	College 1977	Biographer	
John Matteson (born 1961)	Law 1986	Biographer	
Garrett Mattingly (1900–1962)	College 1923	Historian	
Charles Howard McIlwain (1871–1968)	M.A. 1903	Historian	
James Alan McPherson (1943–2016)	Law 1968	Essayist	
Zachary Mider	College 2000	Journalist	
Jack Miles (born 1942)	PhD 1971	Historian	
Paul Moravec (born 1957)	College 1980	Composer, professor	
Samuel Eliot Morison (1887–1976)	College 1908; PhD 1912; professor	Historian	
Siddhartha Mukherjee (born 1970)	M.D. 2000	Author	
Steven Naifeh (born 1952)	Law 1977	Biographer	
Evan Osnos (born 1976)	College 1998	Journalist	
Vernon Louis Parrington (1871–1929)	College 1893	Historian	
Frederic L. Paxson (1877–1948)	M.A.	Historian	
Ralph Barton Perry (1876–1957)	PhD 1899	Philosopher	
Walter Piston (1894–1976)	College 1924	Composer	
Sumner Chilton Powell (1924–1993)	PhD 1956	Historian	
Jack N. Rakove (born 1947)	PhD 1975	Historian	
Samantha Power (born 1970)	Law 1999; professor	Writer	
Tom Reiss (born 1964)	College 1987	Journalist	
David E. Sanger (born 1960)	College 1982	Journalist	
Charlie Savage (born 1975)	College 1998	Journalist	
Sydney Schanberg (1934–2016)	College 1955	Journalist	
Arthur M. Schlesinger Jr. (1917–2007)	College 1938; professor	Historian, advisor to John F. Kennedy	
Carl Emil Schorske (1915–2015)	PhD 1950	Historian	
Lloyd Schwartz (born 1941)	PhD 1976	Author	
Roger Sessions (1896–1985)	College 1915	Composer	
Neil Sheehan (born 1936)	College 1958	Journalist	
Odell Shepard (1884–1967)	PhD 1917	Historian	
Richard H.P. Sia (born 1953)	College 1975	Journalist	
Gregory White Smith (1951–2014)	Law 1978	Biographer	
Tracy K. Smith (born 1972)	College 1994	Poet	
Paul Starr (born 1949)	PhD	Academic	
Farah Stockman (born 1974)	College 1996	Journalist	
Richard Strout (1898–1990)	College 1919	Journalist	
Cyrus Leo Sulzberger II (1912–1993)	College 1934	Journalist	
William Taubman (born 1940)	College 1962	Biographer	
Virgil Thomson (1896–1989)	College 1923	Composer	
John Updike (1932–2009)	College 1954	Novelist, poet, short story writer, critic	
Peter Viereck (1916–2006)	College 1937	Poet	
Charles Warren (1868–1954)	College 1889	Historian	
Jonathan Weiner (born 1953)	College 1976	Historian	
George Weller (1907–2002)	College 1929	Journalist	
Theodore White (1915–1986)	College 1938	Journalist	
Colson Whitehead (born 1969)	College 1991	Author	
Linnie Marsh Wolfe (1881–1945)	Radcliffe 1907	Biographer	
Gordon S. Wood (born 1933)	A.M. 1959; PhD 1964	Historian, professor	
Sheryl WuDunn (born 1959)	M.B.A. 1986	Author	
Yehudi Wyner (born 1929)	M.A.	Composer	

== Royalty and nobility ==
Name	Class year	Notability	Reference(s)
Sheikh Dr. Muhammad Sabah Al-Salem Al-Sabah (born 1955)	PhD 1985	Son of late Emir of Kuwait, Sheikh Sabah III Al-Salim Al-Sabah; Ambassador of Kuwait to the United States from 1993 to 2003; Minister of Foreign Affairs of Kuwait from 2003 to 2011; current prime minister of Kuwait; his elder brother is Sheikh Salem Sabah Al-Salem Al-Sabah, former defense and interior minister	
Aga Khan IV (1936–2025)	B.A. 1959	Born Prince Karim Aga Khan, he was the 49th Imam of Nizari Ismailism, and a descendant of Shah (Emperor) Fat′h-Ali Shah Qajar of the Persian Qajar dynasty	
Birendra Bir Bikram Shah (1945–2001)	HKS 1968	King of Nepal	
Princess Elisabeth, Duchess of Brabant (born 2001)	HKS 2026	Member of the House of Saxe-Coburg and Gotha, of Belgium; Crown princess of Belgium	
Frederik X, King of Denmark (born 1968)	Academic Exchange of one year (1992–1993)	Member of the House of Schleswig-Holstein-Sonderburg-Glücksburg; Crown Prince of Denmark, therefore the heir apparent to the throne of Denmark; elder son of Queen Margrethe II and Henrik, the Prince Consort	
Prince Sadruddin Aga Khan (1933–2003)	College 1954	Son of Aga Khan III, the 48th Imam of Nizari Ismailism; United Nations High Commissioner for Refugees, 1966–1978	
Prince Ali Reza Pahlavi II, of Iran (1966–2011)	PhD student at the time of his death	Member of the Pahlavi imperial family of Iran (Persia); younger son of the former Shah of Persia (Emperor of Persia), Mohammad Reza Pahlavi, and his third wife Empress Farah Pahlavi; second in order of succession to the Iranian throne before the Iranian Revolution	
Mahidol Adulyadej, Prince of Songkla (1892–1929), from Siam (Thailand)	Certificate in Public Health 1921, MD 1927	Member of the House of Chakri, of Siam (Thailand); son of King Chulalongkorn of Siam; father of King Ananda Mahidol (Rama VIII) and King Bhumibol Adulyadej (Rama IX) of Thailand, grandfather of King Vajiralongkorn (Rama X) of Thailand; regarded as the father of modern medicine and public health of Thailand	
Prince Ali Reza Pahlavi I of Iran (1922–1954)	B.A.	Member of the Pahlavi imperial family of Iran (Persia); Reza Shah Pahlavi's second son; brother of Mohammad Reza Pahlavi; the last Shah of Persia (Iran) de facto	
Princess Ariana Austin Makonnen of Ethiopia (born 1984)		wife of Prince Joel Dawit Makonnen; member of the Imperial House of Ethiopia through marriage	
Masako, Empress of Japan (born 1963)	B.A., 1985	Consort of Emperor Naruhito, the first son of Emperor Akihito and Empress Michiko; member of the Imperial House of Japan through marriage	
Prince Maximilian of Liechtenstein (born 1969)	HBS, 1998	Son of Hans-Adam II, Prince of Liechtenstein	
Nazrin Shah of Perak (born 1956)	Masters; PhD	Current Sultan of Perak, one of the Sultans of Malaysia, as a federal constitutional monarchy	
Prince Abdul Reza Pahlavi (1924–2004)	M.A.	Member of the Pahlavi imperial family of Iran (Persia); son of Reza Shah Pahlavi; brother of Mohammad Reza Pahlavi; the last Shah of Persia (Iran) de facto	
Catherine Oxenberg (born 1961)		Member of the Serbian House of Karađorđević; Serbian American actress best known for her role as Amanda Carrington on the 1980s American prime time soap opera Dynasty; daughter of Princess Elizabeth of Yugoslavia and her first husband Howard Oxenberg, a Jewish dress manufacturer and close friend of the Kennedy family	
Prince William zu Lobkowicz (born 1961)	B.A.	Member of the high Bohemian nobility; member of the House of Lobkowicz, one of the oldest Bohemian noble families; his great-grandfather Ferdinand was the 10th Prince zu Lobkowicz when the Austro-Hungarian Empire collapsed, leaving the Bohemian nobility stripped of its legal privileges in 1919	
Princess Maria Carolina Christina of Bourbon-Parma, Duchess of Guernica and Marchioness of Sala (born 1974)		Member of the Royal and Ducal House of Bourbon-Parma, as well of the Dutch royal family; fourth and youngest child of Princess Irene of the Netherlands and Carlos Hugo, Duke of Parma	
Princess Sonam Dechen Wangchuck of Bhutan (born 1981)	Law 2007	Sister of the current King of Bhutan; board member of the Tarayana Foundation	

== Science, technology, medicine, and mathematics ==
Name	Class year	Notability	Reference(s)
Roger Adams (1889–1971)	College 1909, PhD 1912	Pioneering organic chemist	
Howard H. Aiken (1900–1973)	M.A. 1937; PhD 1939	Computer scientist; designer of the Harvard Mark I	
James Gilbert Baker (1914–2005)	PhD 1942	Astronomer, optician	
John Bartlett (1784–1849)	College 1805	Minister, founder of Massachusetts General Hospital	
Manjul Bhargava (born 1974)	College 1996	Mathematician, Fields Medal winner	
Craig Call Black (1932–1998)	PhD 1962	Paleontologist	
Francine D. Blau (born 1946)	M.A. 1969; PhD 1975	Economist at the National Bureau of Economic Research, first woman to receive the IZA Prize in Labor Economics	
Hilary Blumberg	College 1986	Professor of Psychiatric Neuroscience	
Dan Bricklin (born 1951)	Business 1979	Creator of VisiCalc	
Fred Brooks (born 1931)	PhD 1956	Turing Award laureate	
Matthew Cappucci (born 1997)	B.A. 2019	Meteorologist, reporter, storm chaser, author	
Thomas H. Clark (1893–1996)	College 1917; A.M. 1921; PhD 1923	Geologist; one of the top Canadian scientists of the 20th century; namesake of Thomasclarkite	
Mandy Cohen	MPH 2004	Physician; director of the U.S. Centers for Disease Control and Prevention; secretary of the North Carolina Department of Health and Human Services, former executive director of the Centers for Medicare & Medicaid Services, and founding member of Doctors for America	
Stephen Cook (born 1939)	S.M. 1962; PhD 1966	Computer scientist	
Don Coppersmith	S.M. 1975; PhD 1977	Computer scientist	
Leda Cosmides (born 1957)	College 1979; PhD 1985	Evolutionary psychologist	
Robert K. Crane (1919–2010)	PhD 1950	Biochemist	
Harvey Cushing (1869–1939)	Medical 1895	Neurosurgeon	
Elliott Cutler (1888–1947)	College 1909, M.D. 1913; professor	Surgeon and medical educator	
Samuel J. Danishefsky (born 1936)	PhD 1962	Chemist, winner of the Wolf Prize in Chemistry in 1995/96	
J. C. Decius (1920 – 1994)	PhD 1947	Physical chemist, Molecular spectroscopist American Physical Society Fellow, 1962 Guggenheim Fellowship, 1955 Fulbright Fellow, 1955-56 Sloan Fellow, 1956	
Neil deGrasse Tyson (born 1958)	College 1980	Astrophysicist, director of the Hayden Planetarium, television host	
Fe Del Mundo (1909–2011)	Medical 1938	National Scientist of the Philippines; pediatrician; recipient of Ramon Magsaysay Award; devised an incubator made out of bamboo, designed for use in rural communities without electrical power; the first woman admitted as a student at Harvard Medical School	
Russell Doolittle (1931–2019)	PhD, 1962	Biochemist	
Gideon Dreyfuss	PhD 1978	Biochemist, HHMI investigator	
William Duane (1872–1935)	A.B. 1893; A.M. 1895; professor	Physicist, professor emeritus and chair of Biophysics at Harvard, research fellow at Harvard Cancer Commission	
E. Allen Emerson (born 1954)	PhD 1981	Turing Award laureate	
Charles Epstein (1933–2011)	Harvard Medical College 1959	Geneticist; injured by Ted Kaczynski a.k.a. Unabomber	
Paul Farmer (born 1959)	Medical 1988; PhD 1990; professor	Founder of Partners in Health	
Lewis J. Feldman (born 1945)	PhD 1975	Professor of plant biology at the University of California, Berkeley	
Rabab Fetieh (born 1954)	Dental 1987	First Saudi Arabian female orthodontist	
Zachary Fisk (born 1941)	A.B. 1964	Condensed matter physicist	
Edward Frenkel (born 1968)	PhD 1991	Mathematician	
Robert Galambos (1914–2010)	PhD	Researcher who discovered how bats use echolocation	
Bill Gates (born 1955)	No degree	Founder of Microsoft and philanthropist	
Paul Graham (born 1964)	S.M. 1988; PhD 1990	Computer programmer and essayist	
Paul Wender (1934–2016)	College	Biochemist, psychologist	
Ulysses S. Grant IV (1893–1977)	College 1915	Paleontologist	
Brian Greene (born 1963)	College 1984	Famous in the world of string theory; Columbia University professor	
Victor Guillemin (born 1937)	PhD 1962	Differential geometer	
G. Stanley Hall (1844–1924)	PhD 1878	First president of APA and Clark University	
Donald Olding Hebb (1904–1985)	PhD 1936	Canadian psychologist; "father of neuropsychology"; president of the American Psychological Association 1960; fellow of the Royal Society; chancellor of McGill University 1970–1974	
Clarence Leonard Hay (1884–1969)	BA 1908, MA 1911	Archaeologist, curator for the American Museum of Natural History	
George Anthony Hill (1842–1916)	AB 1865, AM 1870	Author of various textbooks, primarily on physics and mathematics; associate professor	
Heisuke Hironaka (born 1931)	PhD 1960; professor	Mathematician, Fields Medal winner	
Arthur Allen Hoag (1921–1999)	PhD 1953	Discovered Hoag's object	
L. Emmett Holt Jr. (1895–1974)	College 1916	Pediatrician	
Elizabeth Ellis Hoyt (1893–1980)	PhD 1925	Economist, considered the inventor of the modern day Consumer Price Index	
Tony Hsieh (1973–2020)	College 1995	CEO of online shoe and clothing shop Zappos, co-founder of LinkExchange, author of Delivering Happiness	
Ruth Hubbard (1924–2016)	PhD 1950 Radcliffe	Professor, biologist	
Ernest Ingersoll (1852–1946)		Naturalist, writer and explorer	
Kenneth E. Iverson (1920–2004)	PhD 1954	Turing Award laureate	
Thomas Jaggar (1871–1953)	PhD 1897	Geologist, founder of the Hawaiian Volcano Observatory	
William James (1842–1910)	Medical 1869	Philosopher; psychologist; namesake of William James Hall	
Stacy Jupiter (born 1975)	AB 1997	Marine scientist	
Michio Kaku (born 1947)	College 1968	Theoretical physicist, activist	
Richard M. Karp (born 1935)	College 1955, PhD 1959	Turing Award laureate	
Jerome H. Kidder (1842–1899)	B.A. 1862; M.A. 1875	Royal surgeon and astronomer, Order of Christ conferred by King of Portugal, the decoration authorized by joint resolution of the United States Congress in 1870	
Alfred Kinsey (1894–1956)	Sc. D. 1919	Sexologist	
Ivan Krstić	College	Computer security expert	
Butler Lampson (born 1943)	College 1964	Turing Award laureate	
Theodore K. Lawless (1892–1971)		Dermatologist; Spingarn Medal	
Saul Levin	M.A. 1994	Psychiatrist	
Holbrook Mann MacNeille (1907–1973)	PhD 1935	Mathematician	
Annie Luetkemeyer	PhD 1999	Infectious diseases physician	
John Marsh (1799–1856)	1823	First medical doctor in California and first Harvard graduate in California.	
Rustin McIntosh (1894–1986)	College 1914; M.D. 1918	Pediatrician	
Curtis T. McMullen (born 1958)	PhD 1985	Fields Medal winner	
Scott McNealy (born 1954)	College 1976	Co-founder and chairman of Sun Microsystems	
John S. Meyer (1924–2011)		Physician	
Marvin Minsky (1927–2016)	College 1950	Computer scientist	
Maryam Mirzakhani (1977–2017)	PhD 2004	Fields Medal winner	
Sylvanus G. Morley (1883–1948)	College 1908	Mayanist scholar and archaeologist	
Robert Tappan Morris (born 1965)	College 1987; S.M. 1993; PhD 1999	CS professor at MIT, creator of the first computer worm	
David Mumford (born 1937)	College 1957; PhD 1961	Mathematician, Fields Medal winner	
Vivek Murthy (born 1977)	College 1997	Vice admiral in the United States Public Health Service Commissioned Corps, 19th and 21st surgeon general of the United States	
Major General Spurgeon Neel (1919–2003)	MPH 1958	Pioneer of aeromedical evacuation	
Simon Newcomb (1835–1909)	BSc 1858	astronomer, applied mathematician and autodidactic polymath	
J. Robert Oppenheimer (1904–1967)	College 1925	Physicist, "father of the atomic bomb"	
Susan Oyama (born 1943)	PhD 1973	Psychologist and philosopher of science, professor emerita at the John Jay College and CUNY Graduate Center. Oyama's systems theory has had a significant impact in philosophy of biology, cognitive science, and psychology.	
Tim O'Reilly (born 1954)	College 1975	Founder of O'Reilly Media	
George Parkman (1790–1849)	College 1809; Medical 1813	Physician, businessman, murder victim	
Charles Sanders Peirce (1839–1914)	College 1859	Philosopher, mathematician	
Abigail Posner	BA 1995	Anthropologist	
Alex K. Shalek (born 1981)	PhD 2011	Single cell genomics key opinion leader	
A. Sivathanu Pillai (born 1947)	Business 1991	Distinguished Scientist and Chief Controller DRDO and CEO of BrahMos Aerospace	
Mark Plotkin (born 1955)	Extension 1979	Ethnobotanist; founder of Amazon Conservation Team	
Daniel Quillen (1940–2011)	College 1961; PhD 1964	Mathematician, Fields Medal winner	
Christian R. H. Raetz (1946–2011)	M.D. and PhD 1973	Professor of biochemistry at Duke University and member of National Academy of Sciences	
Joseph Ransohoff (1915–2001)	College 1938	Neurosurgeon, professor and chairman of the Department of Neurosurgery at the New York University School of Medicine	
Charles Reigeluth	B.A. Economics, 1969	Professor of instructional design systems and creator of Elaboration Theory	
Stuart A. Rice (born 1932)	A.M. 1954; PhD 1955	Physical chemist at The University of Chicago	
Dennis Ritchie (1941–2011)	College 1963; PhD 1968	Computer scientist	
Brian M. Salzberg	PhD 1971	Neuroscientist, biophysicist and professor	
Vern L. Schramm (born 1941)	M.S. nutrition	Professor of biochemistry at the Albert Einstein College of Medicine	
Jon Seger	PhD 1980	Developed theory of bet-hedging in biology; recipient of MacArthur Genius Grant	
Oscar Elton Sette (1900–1972)	M.A. biology 1930	Influential fisheries scientist who pioneered fisheries oceanography and modern fisheries science	
Harold Hill Smith (1910–1994)	PhD	Geneticist	
Richard Stallman (born 1953)	College 1974	Founder of the Free Software Foundation	
John Tooby (born 1952)	PhD 1985	Anthropologist and evolutionary psychologist	
Marius Vassiliou (born 1957)	College 1978	Computational scientist and research executive	
Vladimir Voevodsky (1966–2017)	PhD 1966	Fields Medal winner	
An Wang (1920–1990)	PhD 1948	Computer pioneer; inducted into National Inventors Hall of Fame for magnetic core memory; philanthropist	
William C. Waterhouse (1941–2016)	College 1963; M.A.; PhD 1968	Mathematician, professor	
John White Webster (1793–1850)	College 1811; Medical 1815	Physician, professor, killer; Parkman-Webster murder case	
Edward Osborne Wilson (1929–2021)	PhD 1955; professor	Biologist	
Charles F. Winslow (1811–1877)	Medical 1834	Physician, diplomat, and atomic theorist	
John Winthrop (1714–1779)	College 1732; professor	Astronomer, mathematician	
Chauncey Wright (1830–1875)	College 1852	Mathematician, philosopher, professor	
Andrew Yao (born 1946)	PhD 1972	Turing Award laureate	
Norbert Wiener (1894–1964)	PhD 1913	Mathematician, philosopher, professor	
Glenn Mcdonald (born 1967)	College 1989	Data Engineer, Author of You Have Not Yet Heard Your Favorite Song	
William James Sidis (1898–1944)	A.B. cum laude 1914	Mathematician	

== Business ==
Name	Class year	Notability	Reference(s)
Bill Ackman (born 1966)	College, Business 1995	CEO of Pershing Square Capital Management	
Darius Adamczyk (born 1966)	Business 1995	CEO of Honeywell	
William McPherson Allen (1900–1985)	Law 1925	CEO of Boeing	
Adam Aron (born 1954)	College 1976, Business 1979	CEO of AMC Theatres	
J. Paul Austin (1915–1985)	College 1937	CEO of The Coca-Cola Company	
Charles Francis Adams Jr. (1835–1915)	College 1856	President of Union Pacific Railroad	
Marcus Agius (born 1946)	Business 1972	Chairman, Barclays PLC	
A. Charles Baillie (born 1939)	Business	CEO of Toronto-Dominion Bank	
Steve Ballmer (born 1956)	College 1977	President and CEO of Microsoft	
Jim Balsillie (born 1961)	Business 1989	CEO of Research in Motion	
Hans W. Becherer (1935–2016)	Business	CEO of John Deere	
Alex Behring (born 1967)	Business 1995	Chairman of Kraft Heinz	
Charles M. Berger (1936–2008)	Business, 1960	Business executive, H. J. Heinz Company; CEO of The Scotts Miracle-Gro Company	
Gordon Binder (born 1935)		CEO of Amgen (1988–2000)	
Frank Biondi (1945–2019)	Business	CEO of Viacom, Universal Pictures	
Frank Blake (born 1949)	College 1971	CEO of The Home Depot	
Lloyd Blankfein (born 1954)	College 1975; Law 1978	CEO and Chairman of Goldman Sachs	
Leonard Blavatnik (born 1957)	Business 1989	Founder of Access Industries	
Nathan Blecharczyk (born 1983)	College	Co-founder of Airbnb	
Djuradj Caranovic (born 1983)	MBA	Major Partner of Fundus Heritage Ventures	
Ana Patricia Botín (born 1960)	Business	Chairperson of Santander Group	
Robert A. Bradway	Business 1990	CEO of Amgen	
Charles Bunch (born 1950)	Business 1979	CEO of PPG Industries	
Daniel Burke (1929–2011)	MBA 1955	Former President of the American Broadcasting Company (ABC) 1986–94, engineered the $3.5 billion acquisition of ABC by Capital Cities in 1986	
James E. Burke (1925–2012)	Business 1949	CEO of Johnson & Johnson	
Philip Caldwell (1920–2013)	Business 1942	CEO of Ford Motor Company	
John T. Cahill	College; MBA	Chairman and CEO of The Pepsi Bottling Group	
Gene Camarena	Business 1987	President and CEO of La Raza Pizza, a Pizza Hut franchisee	
Chase Carey (born 1954)	Business 1979	President of News Corporation	
Winslow Carlton (1907–1994)	Business 1929	Businessman and cooperative organizer	
Donald J. Carty (born 1946)	Business	CEO of AMR Corporation	
Doug Carlston (born 1947)	College 1970; Law 1975	Co-founder of Broderbund Software	
Gregory C. Case (born 1963)	Business	CEO of Aon	
Albert Vincent Casey (1920–2004)	College, Business 1948	CEO of American Airlines	
R. Martin Chavez	Biochemistry 1985	CFO of Goldman Sachs	
Kenneth Chenault (born 1951)	Law 1976	CEO of American Express	
Shou Zi Chew	Business 2010	CEO of TikTok	
Howard L. Clark Sr. (1916–2001)	Law	Former CEO of American Express (1960–1977)	
Michael Cohrs	College 1979; Business 1981	Group Executive Committee of Deutsche Bank	
Vittorio Colao (born 1961)	Business	CEO of Vodafone	
Edward Conard	Business 1982	Founding partner, Bain Capital	
Michael Corbat (born 1960)	College 1983	CEO of Citigroup	
Zoe Cruz (born 1955)	College 1977; Business 1982	Former Co-President of Morgan Stanley	
H. Lawrence Culp Jr. (born 1964)	Business 1990	CEO of General Electric	
Ray Dalio (born 1949)	Business	Founder of Bridgewater Associates	
John D'Agostino	MBA, 2002	MD of Alkeon Capital, youngest Head of Strategy for NYMEX and subject of best-selling book Rigged: The Ivy League Kid who Changed the World of Oil From Wall Street to Dubai	
Jamie Dimon (born 1956)	Business 1982	Chairman and CEO of JPMorgan Chase	
James Dole (1877–1950)	College 1899	Founder of Dole Food Company	
Tim Draper (born 1958)	Business 1984	Venture capitalist	
Robert Louis-Dreyfus (1946–2009)	Business 1973	CEO of Adidas	
Colin Drummond (born 1951)	MBA	CEO of Viridor and joint CEO of Pennon Group	
Mark Ein (born 1964)	MBA 1992	Venture capitalist, sports team owner	
Mark Fields (born 1961)	Business	CEO of Ford Motor Company	
Robert Fornaro (born 1952 or 1953)	Design	CEO of Spirit Airlines	
Kenneth Frazier (born 1954)	Law 1978	CEO of Merck & Co.	
Victor Fung (born 1945)	PhD 1971	Chairman of Li & Fung group of companies	
Elbridge T. Gerry Sr. (1909–1999)	BA, 1931	General partner of Brown Brothers Harriman & Co.; director of the Union Pacific Railroad 1957–86	
Louis V. Gerstner Jr. (born 1942)	Business 1965	CEO of RJR Nabisco and IBM	
Walter Sherman Gifford (1885–1966)	College 1905	President of AT&T Corporation	
Melvin Gordon (1919–2015)	College 1941, Business 1943	CEO of Tootsie Roll Industries	
Jonathan Grayer (born 1964)	College 1986; Business 1990	Founder and CEO of Imagine Learning; CEO of Kaplan, Inc.	
Kenneth C. Griffin (born 1968)	College 1989	Chairman of Citadel LLC	
Gerald Grinstein (born 1932)	Law 1957	Former CEO of Delta Air Lines	
David L. Gunn (born 1937)	College 1959	CEO of Amtrak	
Rajat Gupta	MBA 1973	Businessman, later convicted for insider trading	
Walter A. Haas Jr. (1916–1995)	Business 1939	CEO of Levi Strauss & Co.	
Torstein Hagen (born 1943)	Business 1968	Founder of Viking Cruises	
Josh Harris (born 1964)	MBA 1990	Co-founder of Apollo Global Management, owner of the NBA's Philadelphia 76ers, the NHL's New Jersey Devils, and the NFL's Washington Commanders	
Fred Hassan (born 1945)	Business 1972	CEO of Schering-Plough	
Trip Hawkins (born 1953)	College 1976	Founder of Electronic Arts and the 3DO Company	
Sean M. Healey (born 1961)	College 1983; Law 1987	CEO of Affiliated Managers Group and chairman of the Peabody Essex Museum	
Warren Hellman (1934–2011)	Business 1959	Founder of Hellman & Friedman and Hellman, Ferri Investment Associates (today Matrix Partners); former president, chairman, head of Investment Banking Division of Lehman Brothers	
John B. Hess (born 1954)	College 1975	CEO of Hess Corporation	
Darren Huston (born 1966)	Business	CEO of The Priceline Group	
Jeffrey R. Immelt (born 1956)	Business 1982	Chairman and CEO of General Electric	
Leila Janah (1982–2020)	College 2005	CEO of Samasource	
Andy Jassy (born 1967/68)	College 1990, Business 1997	CEO of Amazon Inc.	
Abigail Johnson (born 1961)	Business 1988	CEO of Fidelity Investments	
Edward Johnson, III (born 1930)	College 1954	CEO of Fidelity Investments	
Philip Johnston (born 1986)	HKS 2019	Co-Founder and CEO of Starcloud	
Whipple V. N. Jones (1909–2001)	College 1932, Business	Founder of Aspen Highlands	
Leo Kahn (1916–2011)	College 1938	Co-Founder of Staples Inc.	
George Kaiser (born 1942)	College 1964	Chairman of BOK Financial Corporation	
Carol Kalish (1955–1991)	Radcliffe College	Editor, Marvel Comics executive	
Steven A. Kandarian	Business 1989	CEO of MetLife	
Chris Kempczinski	Business 1997	CEO of McDonald's	
Jeff Kindler (born 1955)	Law 1980	CEO of Pfizer	
Rollin King (1931–2014)	Business 1964	Founder of Southwest Airlines	
Jim Koch (born 1949)	College 1971, Business & Law 1978	Founder of Boston Beer Company	
Robert Kraft (born 1941)	Business 1965	CEO of The Kraft Group, New England Patriots owner	
Tatparanandam Ananda Krishnan (born 1938)	Business 1964	Tamil Malaysian businessman and philanthropist	
A.G. Lafley (born 1947)	Business 1977	CEO of Procter & Gamble	
J. Hicks Lanier	Business 1964	CEO of Oxford Industries	
Bryan Leach	College 2000	Founder and CEO of Ibotta	
Kewsong Lee (born 1965)	College 1986; Business 1990	CEO of The Carlyle Group	
Jorge Paulo Lemann (born 1939)	College 1961	Founder of 3G Capital	
Reginald Lewis (1942–1993)	Law 1968	Former CEO of Beatrice Foods	
John Langeloth Loeb Jr. (born 1930)	College 1952; Business 1954	Chairman of Loeb, Rhoades Trust Company; former United States Ambassador to Denmark	
Charles Lowrey	Business	Former CEO of Prudential Financial	
Paul B. Loyd Jr.	M.B.A.	Former chairman and chief executive officer of the R&B Falcon Corporation (1997–2001)	
Michael Lynton (born 1960)	College 1982, Business 1985	CEO of Sony Pictures Entertainment	
Stanley Marcus (1905–2002)	College 1925; Business 1926	President and CEO, Neiman Marcus department stores	
Charles Peter McColough (1922–2006)	Business 1949	CEO of Xerox Corporation; Namesake of C. Peter McColough Roundtable Series on International Economics at the Council on Foreign Relations	
Ross McEwan (born 1957)	Business	CEO of National Australia Bank	
Douglas McGregor (1906–1964)	A.M. 1933; PhD 1935	Management theorist	
Scott McNealy (born 1954)	College 1976	Co-founder of Sun Microsystems	
James McNerney (born 1949)	Business 1975	Chairman and CEO of Boeing	
George W. Merck (1894–1957)	College 1915	Industrialist, president of Merck & Co.	
Hiroshi Mikitani (born 1966)	Business 1993	CEO of Rakuten	
Charles Moorman (born 1953)	Business 1978	CEO of Amtrak, Norfolk Southern Railway	
Henry Sturgis Morgan (1900–1982)	College 1923	Co-founder of Morgan Stanley	
J. P. Morgan Jr. (1867–1943)	College 1886	President of J.P. Morgan & Co.	
Charlie Munger (1924–2023)	Law 1948	Vice Chairman of Berkshire Hathaway	
Vasant Narasimhan (born 1976)	Medical, KSG 2003	CEO of Novartis	
David Nelms (born 1961)	Business 1987	CEO of Discover Financial	
Albert Nickerson (1911–1994)	College 1933	CEO of Mobil	
Roy Niederhoffer (born 1966)	College 1987	Founder and President of R. G. Niederhoffer Capital Management, Inc.	
Irving S. Olds (1887–1963)	Law 1910	CEO of U.S. Steel	
Bradley Palmer (1866–1946)	College 1888; Law 1889	Drafted the merger that formed United Fruit Company; served on the board of directors for Gillette and ITT; appointed to represent President Woodrow Wilson at the Paris Peace Conference	
Ellen Pao (born 1970)		CEO of Reddit	
John Paulson (born 1955)	Business 1980	Founder of Paulson & Co.	
Art Peck (born 1955)	Business 1979	CEO of Gap Inc.	
Ken Powell (born 1954)	College 1976	CEO of General Mills	
Vivek Ramaswamy (born 1985)	College 2007	Founder of Roivant Sciences, co-founder of Strive Asset Management	
Vivek Ranadivé (born 1957)	Business 1983	CEO of TIBCO Software	
Sumner Redstone (born 1923)	College 1944; Law 1947	Chairman and CEO of Viacom	
James Reed (born 1963)	MBA 1990	Chairman and chief executive of the Reed group of companies	
Fred Reichheld (born 1952)	College 1974; Business 1978	Author of bestselling business books	
Robert Ridder (1919–2000)		Director of Knight Ridder media	
David Rockefeller (1915–2017)	College 1936	Banker; philanthropist; Chairman of Chase Manhattan Bank; son of American financer John D. Rockefeller Jr.; grandson of Standard Oil co-founder John D. Rockefeller	
Gary Rodkin	Business 1980	CEO of ConAgra Foods	
Harry M. Rubin (born 1952)	Business 1976	Co-founder of Samuel Adams; COO and CFO of Atari, Inc.	
Robert Rubin (born 1938)	Economics 1960	United States Secretary of the Treasury	
Sheryl Sandberg (born 1969)	College 1991	COO of Facebook	
Ulf Mark Schneider (born 1965)	Business 1993	CEO of Nestlé	
Steve Schwarzman (born 1947)	Business 1972	Billionaire, owner of Blackstone Group	
Daniel C. Searle (1926–2007)	Business 1952	Heir, CEO of G. D. Searle & Company, conservative philanthropist	
Frank Shrontz (born 1931)	Business 1958	CEO of Boeing	
Jeffrey Skilling (born 1953)	Business 1979	CEO of Enron; convicted of fraud and conspiracy	
Jeff Smisek (born 1954)	Law 1982	CEO of United Airlines	
Orin C. Smith (1942–2018)	Business 1967	CEO of Starbucks	
Thomas G. Stemberg (1949–2015)	College 1971/Business 1973	Co-founder of Staples Inc.	
Jan Stenbeck (1942–2002)	Business	President of MTG	
Gerald L. Storch	College	CEO of Hudson's Bay Company	
William H Sumner (1780–1861)	College 1799	Developed East Boston	
Marcel Herrmann Telles (born 1950)	Business	Founder of 3G Capital	
Haslina Taib		Chair of the ASEAN Business and Investment Summit	
Anand Mahindra (born 1955)	College 1979; Business 1981	Chairman of Mahindra Group	
Ratan Naval Tata (born 1937)	Business 1975	Chairman of Tata Group	
John Thain (born 1955)	Business 1979	Chairman and CEO of CIT Group, last chairman and CEO of Merrill Lynch	
Charlemagne Tower (1809–1889)	Law 1830	Lawyer, businessman; namesake of towns in Pennsylvania, Minnesota, and North Dakota; served on Harvard's board of overseers	
Robert Uihlein Jr. (1916–1976)	College 1938	Chairman of the Joseph Schlitz Brewing Company	
Rick Wagoner (born 1953)	Business 1977	CEO of General Motors	
Michael J. Ward (born 1950)	Business 1973	CEO of CSX Corporation	
Meg Whitman (born 1956)	Business 1979	CEO of HP Inc.	
Harry Elkins Widener (1885–1912)	College 1907	Namesake of Harvard's Widener Library; died in the sinking of the Titanic	
Arne Wilhelmsen (1929–2020)	Business	Founder of Royal Caribbean Cruises Ltd.	
Ryan Williams (born 1988)	College 2010	Founder of Cadre	
Leah Zell (born 1949)	College 1971	Investor	
Moses Znaimer (born 1942)	A.M.	Canadian media mogul	
Mortimer Zuckerman (born 1937)	Law 1962	Owner of New York Daily News and U.S. News & World Report	
Howard Jonas (born 1956)	College 1978	Founder and CEO of IDT Corporation	

- Victor Niederhoffer (1943– 2026), hedge fund manager, U.S. Squash Champion and Paddleball Champion, bestselling author, and statistician.
- Whitney Tilson (born 1966), hedge fund manager, philanthropist, author, and Democratic political activist
- Monroe Trout (born 1962), formerly American, hedge fund manager
- Georges Frem (1934–2006), Lebanese businessman, philanthropist and politician

== Law ==
=== Supreme Court justices ===
Name	Class year	Notability	Reference(s)
Dhananjaya Y. Chandrachud (born 1959)	Law 1983	Chief Justice of the Supreme Court of India	
Sophia Akuffo (born 1949)	Law	Chief Justice of the Supreme Court of Ghana	
Solomon Areda Waktolla (born 1975)	Harvard Kennedy School, MPA 2013 Harvard Law School, LLM 2014	Judge at United Nations Dispute Tribunal Judge at Administrative Tribunal of African Development Bank Former Deputy Chief Justice of Ethiopia, Member of Permanent Court of Arbitration at Hague	
Mary Arden, Lady Arden of Heswall (born 1947)	Law 1970	Judge of the Supreme Court of the United Kingdom	
Richard Reeve Baxter (1921–1980)	Law 1948	Justice of the International Court of Justice	
Kwamena Bentsi-Enchill (1919–1974)	Law	Justice of the Supreme Court of Ghana	
Harry Blackmun (1908–1999)	College 1929, Law 1932	Justice of the Supreme Court of the United States	
Peter Blanchard (born 1942)	Law	Justice of the Supreme Court of New Zealand	
Louis Brandeis (1856–1941)	Law 1877	Justice of the Supreme Court of the United States	
William J. Brennan Jr. (1906–1997)	Law 1931	Justice of the Supreme Court of the United States	
Stephen Breyer (born 1938)	Law 1964	Justice of the Supreme Court of the United States	
Henry Billings Brown (1836–1913)	Law 1859	Justice of the Supreme Court of the United States	
Thomas Buergenthal (born 1934)	Law	Justice of the International Court of Justice	
Harold H. Burton (1888–1964)	Law 1912	Justice of the Supreme Court of the United States	
Renato Corona (1948–2016)	Law 1982	Chief Justice of the Supreme Court of the Philippines	
Benjamin Curtis (1809–1874)	College 1829; Law 1832	Justice of the Supreme Court of the United States	
William Cushing (1732–1810)	College 1751	Justice of the Supreme Court of the United States	
James Wilfred Estey (1889–1956)	Law 1915	Justice of the Supreme Court of Canada	
Willard Estey (1919–2002)	Law 1946	Justice of the Supreme Court of Canada	
Jens Evensen (1917–2004)	Law 1968	Justice of the International Court of Justice	
Marcelo Fernan (1927–1999)	Law 1954	Justice of the Supreme Court of the Philippines	
Felix Frankfurter (1882–1965)	Law 1906	Justice of the Supreme Court of the United States	
Stephen Gageler (born 1958)	Law 1987	Justice of the Supreme Court of Australia	
Neil Gorsuch (born 1967)	Law 1991	Justice of the Supreme Court of the United States	
Horace Gray (1828–1902)	College 1845; Law 1849	Justice of the Supreme Court of the United States	
Irmgard Griss (born 1946)	Law 1975	President of the Austrian Supreme Court of Justice	
Ofer Grosskopf (born 1969)	Law 1999	Justice of the Supreme Court of Israel	
Oliver Wendell Holmes Jr. (1841–1935)	College 1861; Law 1866	Justice of the Supreme Court of the United States	
Ketanji Brown Jackson (born 1970)	College 1992; Law 1996	Justice of the Supreme Court of the United States	
Francis Jardeleza (born 1949)	Law 1977	Justice of the Supreme Court of the Philippines	
Elena Kagan (born 1960)	Law 1986	Justice of the Supreme Court of the United States	
Sisi Khampepe (born 1957)	Law	Judge of the Constitutional Court of South Africa	
Kenneth Keith (born 1937)	Law	Justice of the International Court of Justice	
Anthony Kennedy (born 1936)	Law 1961	Justice of the Supreme Court of the United States	
Bora Laskin (1912–1984)	Law 1937	Justice of the Supreme Court of Canada	
Koen Lenaerts (born 1954)	Law 1978, KSG 1979	Justice of the European Court of Justice	
Gertrude Lübbe-Wolff (born 1953)	Law 1975	Justice of the Supreme Court of Germany	
Eilert Stang Lund (born 1939)	Law 1973	Justice of the Supreme Court of Norway	
John McLean (1785–1861)	College 1806	Justice of the Supreme Court of the United States	
Alfredo Gutiérrez Ortiz Mena (born 1969)	Law	Justice of the Supreme Court of Mexico	
Sundaresh Menon (born 1962)	Law 1991	Chief Justice of Singapore	
Yuko Miyazaki (born 1951)	Law 1984	Justice of the Supreme Court of Japan	
William Henry Moody (1853–1917)	College 1876	Justice of the Supreme Court of the United States	
Rohinton Fali Nariman (born 1956)	Law 1981	Justice of the Supreme Court of India	
Sandile Ngcobo (born 1953)	Law	Justice of the Supreme Court of South Africa	
Masaharu Ōhashi (born 1947)	Law 1976	Justice of the Supreme Court of Japan	
Lewis F. Powell Jr. (1907–1998)	Law 1932	Justice of the Supreme Court of the United States	
Ivan Rand (1884–1969)	Law 1912	Justice of the Supreme Court of Canada	
William Rehnquist (1924–2005)	A.M. 1950	Chief Justice of the United States	
John Roberts (born 1955)	College 1976; Law 1979	Chief Justice of the United States	
Edward Terry Sanford (1865–1930)	College 1885; A.M. 1889; Law 1889	Justice of the Supreme Court of the United States	
Vicente Abad Santos (1916–1993)	Law	Justice of the Supreme Court of the Philippines	
Antonin Scalia (1936–2016)	Law 1960	Justice of the Supreme Court of the United States	
Stephen M. Schwebel (born 1929)	College 1950	Justice of the International Court of Justice	
Dave Smuts	Law 1983	Judge of the Supreme Court of Namibia	
David Souter (born 1939)	College 1961; Law 1966	Justice of the Supreme Court of the United States	
Wishart Spence (1904–1998)	Law 1929	Justice of the Supreme Court of Canada	
Joseph Story (1779–1845)	College 1798; professor	Justice of the Supreme Court of the United States	

=== Other legal figures ===
Name	Class year	Notability	Reference(s)
Alvin Bragg (born 1973)	Class of 1995	Elected Manhattan district attorney 2022	
Andrea Álvarez Marín (born 1986)		Member of the Legislative Assembly of Costa Rica	
Joshua Atherton (1737–1809)	Class of 1762	Attorney general of New Hampshire	
John O. Bailey (1880–1959)	Class of 1906	State supreme court justice from Oregon	
Stephen Barnett (1935–2009)	College 1957; Law 1962	Legal scholar at Berkeley Law who opposed the Newspaper Preservation Act of 1970	
George Tyler Bigelow (1810–1878)	College 1829	Associate justice and chief justice of the Massachusetts Supreme Judicial Court	
Richard Blumenthal (born 1946)	College	Former Attorney General of Connecticut	
Thomas J. Burke (1896–1966)	College 1920	Justice of the Supreme Court of North Dakota 1939–1966; chief justice 1955–56; 1965–66	
Andrew Cheung (born 1961)	Master of Laws 1985	Chief judge of the High Court of Hong Kong	
Archibald Cox (1912–2004)	College 1934; Law 1937	Special prosecutor in the Watergate Scandal	
Nora Dannehy (born 1961)	Law 1986	Special prosecutor in the dismissal of U.S. attorneys controversy, former U.S. attorney for the District of Columbia; deputy attorney general of Connecticut	
Bruce Fein (born 1947)	Law 1972	Founder of Bruce Fein & Associates, Inc.; principal civil liberties activist in The Lichfield Group; analyst and commentator for conservative think tanks; top Justice Department official under Ronald Reagan administration; senior policy advisor for the Ron Paul 2012 presidential campaign	
Patrick Fitzgerald (born 1961)	Law 1985	Special prosecutor in the Plame affair; United States attorney	
Stephen Gageler (born 1958)	Master of Laws 1987	Justice of the High Court of Australia	
Merrick Garland (born 1952)	College 1974; Law 1977	Attorney general of the United States; former chief judge of the United States Court of Appeals for the District of Columbia Circuit	
Paul C. Gartzke (1927–2009)	Law 1952	Presiding judge of the Wisconsin Court of Appeals	
Kumiki Gibson (born 1959)	Extension 1985	Chief counsel to the V.P. Al Gore 1994–97	
Terry Goddard (born 1947)	College 1969	Attorney general of Arizona	
Ulysses S. Grant Jr. (1852–1929)	College 1874	Attorney, land developer	
William B. Gray (1942–1994)	College 1964	US attorney for Vermont	
John Patrick Hartigan (1887–1968)	Law 1909	Judge of the United States Court of Appeals for the First Circuit and United States District Court for the District of Rhode Island	
Charles Hamilton Houston (1895–1950)	Law 1923	Dean of Howard University Law School, lawyer for NAACP	
Joseph D. Kearney	Law 1989	Dean of Marquette University Law School	
Harold Hongju Koh (born 1954)	College 1975; Law 1980	Legal adviser of the Department of State; former dean of Yale Law School	
Juliane Kokott (born 1957)	Law	Advocate general at the European Court of Justice	
Saritha Komatireddy (born 1984 or 1985)	College 2005; Law 2009	Federal prosecutor, chief of staff of the Drug Enforcement Administration, and Republican nominee for attorney general of New York in the 2026 election	
John H. Langbein (born 1941)	Law 1968	Legal scholar, professor at Yale Law School	
Harry Litman (born 1958)	College 1981	US Attorney for the Western District of Pennsylvania (appointed in 1998)	
Kayleigh McEnany (born 1988)	Law 2016	Political commentator and White House press secretary	
Tom Mesereau (born 1950)	College 1973	Criminal defense attorney	
James T. Mitchell (1834–1915)	1855	Chief justice of the Supreme Court of Pennsylvania	
Wendell Phillips (born 1811)	College 1831, Law 1833	Abolitionist	
Elizabeth Prelogar (born 1980)	Law 2008	Solicitor general of the United States, former clerk for Ruth Bader Ginsburg and Elena Kagan	
Paul Reardon (1909–1988)	College 1932, Law 1935	Justice of the Massachusetts Supreme Judicial Court	
Lemuel Shaw (1781–1861)	College 1800	Chief justice of Massachusetts Supreme Court	
Michael Wachter (born 1943)	M.A. 1967, PhD 1970	Professor at the University of Pennsylvania Law School	
Samuel D. Warren II (1852–1910)	Law 1877	Attorney; law partner of Louis Brandeis	
Henry C. Whitaker (born 1978)	Law J.D. magna cum laude 2003	Solicitor general of Florida, 2021–present	
Valerie Zachary (born 1962)	Law J.D. cum laude 1987	Associate judge of the North Carolina Court of Appeals, 2015–present	

- Danielle Sassoon, Class of 2008, former acting US attorney for the Southern District of New York

== Military ==
Name	Class year	Notability	Reference(s)
John Abizaid (born 1951)	A.M. 1981	U.S. Army general, Commander of United States Central Command (CENTCOM)	
Douglas Campbell (1896–1990)	A.B. 1917	Soldier, World War I ace	
Erle Cocke Jr. (1921–2000)	M.B.A. 1947	U.S. Army officer in World War II, Silver Star Medal recipient, National Commander of the American Legion (1950–51)	
George Downing (c. 1624–1684)	College 1642	English soldier, diplomat	
Peter Fanta	M.P.A.	U.S. Navy admiral	
Manning Force (1824–1899)	College 1845; Law 1848	Union Army general, Medal of Honor recipient, judge, author	
David Gurfein	M.B.A. 2000	U.S. Marine Corps lieutenant colonel, and CEO of nonprofit organization United American Patriots	
Pierpont M. Hamilton (1898–1982)	College 1920; A.M. 1946	U.S. Army Air Forces general in World War II, Medal of Honor recipient	
Walter Newell Hill (1881–1955)	College 1904	U.S. Marine Corps general, Medal of Honor recipient	
Henry S. Huidekoper (1839–1918)	College 1862; A.M. 1872	Union Army officer, Medal of Honor recipient	
John William Kilbreth (1876–1958)	College 1898	U.S. Army brigadier general during World War I, Army Distinguished Service Medal recipient	
Claud Ashton Jones (1885–1948)	M.S. 1915	U.S. Navy admiral, Medal of Honor recipient	
Henry Ware Lawton (1843–1899)	Law 1866	U.S. Army general, Medal of Honor recipient, killed in the Philippine–American War	
John N. Lotz	Business 1971	Air National Guard general	
George G. McMurtry (1876–1958)	College 1899	U.S. Army officer in World War I with the "Lost Battalion", Medal of Honor recipient	
Hal Moore (1922–2017)		U.S. Army general, author of We Were Soldiers Once... And Young	
Robert C. Murray (1946–1970)	Business 1970	U.S. Army soldier killed in the Vietnam War, Medal of Honor recipient	
Charles Coudert Nast (1903–1981)	Law 1925	Attorney and U.S. Army major general	
Norris W. Overton (1926–2023)	Business 1972	U.S. Air Force general	
Charles E. Phelps (1833–1908)	Law 1853	Union Army general, Medal of Honor recipient, U.S. Representative from Maryland, lawyer, judge	
Horace Porter (1837–1921)	Lawrence Scientific School 1857	Union Army general, Medal of Honor recipient, businessman, ambassador to France	
Josiah Porter (1830–1894)	College 1852, Law 1855	Adjutant General of New York	
Theodore Roosevelt Jr. (1887–1944)	College 1909	Son of President Theodore Roosevelt, U.S. Army general, Medal of Honor recipient, businessman, Governor of Puerto Rico, Governor-General of the Philippines	
Don Ross (1922–2015)	PhD in Applied Physics & Engineering Science 1953	recipient of the Navy Distinguished Civilian Service Award, made important developments in reduction of submarine noise	
Leroy A. Schreiber (1917–1944)	1939	U.S. Army Air Forces fighter ace killed in World War II	
Sherrod E. Skinner Jr. (1929–1952)	1951	U.S. Marine Corps officer killed in the Korean War, Medal of Honor recipient	
Phillips Waller Smith (1906–1963)	M.B.A. 1940	U.S. Air Force general	
Oliver Lyman Spaulding (1875–1947)	M.A. 1932	U.S. Army general	
Hazard Stevens (1842–1918)	College 1865	Union Army general, Medal of Honor recipient, Massachusetts state legislator, mountaineer	
Artemas Ward (1727–1800)	College 1748	Major General in the American Revolutionary War and a Congressman from Massachusetts	
Arthur Harold Webber (1893–1918)	Harvard 1915	Volunteer with RAF Squadron 84; killed in flying accident in Texas, April 10, 1918	
Charles White Whittlesey (1884–1921)	Law 1908	U.S. Army officer in World War I, commander of the "Lost Battalion", Medal of Honor recipient	
Leonard Wood (1860–1927)	Medical 1884	U.S. Army general, military surgeon, commander of the Rough Riders, 5th Chief of Staff of the United States Army, Military Governor of Cuba and Governor General of the Philippines, Medal of Honor recipient	
Isoroku Yamamoto (1884–1943)	1919–1921	Japanese Marshal Admiral of the Imperial Japanese Navy	

== Journalism ==
Name	Class year	Notability	Reference(s)
Jill Abramson (born 1954)	College 1976	Former executive editor of The New York Times	
Jacqueline Alemany (born 1989)	College 2011	Washington Post White House Reporter	
Christian Alfonsi	PhD 1999	Author, Circle in the Sand, about Gulf War and Iraq War	
Jonathan Alter (born 1957)	College 1979	Former senior editor of Newsweek	
Steve Bannon (born 1953)	MBA 1983	Media executive, political strategist	
Melissa Block (born 1962)	College 1983	Host of NPR's All Things Considered	
Ben Bradlee (1921–2014)	College 1944	Washington Post executive editor during Watergate scandal	
Warren T. Brookes (1929–1991)	College 1952	Newspaper columnist for Detroit News, known for economics reporting	
James Brown (born 1951)	College 1973	Sportscaster	
Leslie T. Chang	1991	Journalist (former correspondent in Beijing, China for The Wall Street Journal; author of Factory Girls: From Village to City in a Changing China	
Susan Chira (born 1958)	College 1980	Foreign editor of The New York Times since 2004	
Kevin Corke	HKS 2004	Journalist, NBC News	
Jim Cramer (born 1955)	College 1977; Law 1984	Television host	
E. J. Dionne (born 1952)	College 1973	Washington Post columnist	
Lou Dobbs (born 1945)	College 1967	Television host	
William Emerson (1923–2009)	College 1948	Covered the civil rights era as Newsweek's first bureau chief assigned to cover the Southern United States; editor in chief of The Saturday Evening Post	
Sharon Epperson (born 1968)	College, 1990	Television finance correspondent for CNBC	
James Fallows (born 1949)	College 1970	Journalist	
Amy Goodman (born 1957)	College 1984	Liberal political commentator, founder of Democracy Now!	
Donald E. Graham (born 1945)	College 1966	The Washington Post Company chairman and CEO	
Kristen Green	HKS	Journalist and author	
Aaron Harber	MPA	Political analyst for CBS 4 KCNC-TV, host of The Aaron Harber Show on Colorado Public Broadcasting KBDI-TV	
William Randolph Hearst	Class of 1885, No degree	Businessman, newspaper publisher, politician	
Walter Isaacson (born 1952)	College 1974	Former CNN chairman and CEO; managing editor of TIME; author	
Boisfeuillet Jones Jr. (born 1946)	College 1968; Law 1974	Washington Post publisher and CEO	
Mary Louise Kelly (born 1971)	College 1993	Host of NPR's All Things Considered	
Michael Kinsley (born 1951)	College 1972; Law 1977	Journalist	
Jason E. Klein	MBA 1986	CEO of Times Mirror Magazines and CEO of Newspaper National Network LP	
Dorie Klissas	College 1985	Journalist, television producer, CBS Evening News, Today	
Nicholas D. Kristof (born 1960)	College 1981	New York Times reporter and columnist; two-time Pulitzer Prize winner	
William Kristol (born 1952)	College 1973; PhD 1979	Editor of The Weekly Standard	
Melissa Lee	College 1995	News anchor of CNBC	
Nicholas Lemann (born 1954)	College 1976	The New Yorker magazine journalist, former dean of the Columbia University Graduate School of Journalism	
Suzanne Malveaux (born 1966)	College 1987	CNN correspondent	
Michel Martin	College 1980	Weekend host of NPR's All Things Considered; Emmy Award–winner	
Judith Matloff (born 1958)	College 1981	Journalist, author, and media safety advocate	
Josh Morgerman		Businessman, storm chaser, TV personality, and field correspondent	
Leon Neyfakh	College 2007	Host and creator of podcast Slow Burn	
Soledad O'Brien (born 1966)	College 1987	Television host	
Thomas Oliphant	College 1967	Boston Globe columnist	
Bill O'Reilly (born 1949)	HKS 1996	Journalist and conservative political commentator; host of The O'Reilly Factor	
Silvia Poggioli (born 1946)	College 1968	Foreign correspondent, NPR	
John Reed (1887–1920)	College 1910	Journalist, activist	
Joy-Ann Reid (born 1968)	College 1990	MSNBC correspondent and host of AM Joy	
Frank Rich (born 1949)	College 1971	New York Times columnist	
Stephen Sackur (born 1964)		BBC journalist	
Peter Sagal (born 1965)	College 1987	Public radio host of Wait Wait... Don't Tell Me!, playwright, screenwriter, actor	
Bill Schneider (born 1944)	A.M. 1969, PhD 1972	Journalist, political analyst	
Lara Setrakian (born 1982)	2004	Journalist, political analyst	
Richard H.P. Sia (born 1953)	College 1975	Journalist, International Consortium of Investigative Journalists; National Journal; Baltimore Sun.	
Sam Sifton (born 1966)	College 1988	New York Times chief restaurant critic	
Andrew Sullivan (born 1963)	HKS 1986; PhD 1990	Blogger, journalist	
Evan Thomas (born 1951)	College 1973	Journalist for Newsweek and TIME; author of two New York Times bestsellers	
Pablo Torre (born 1985)	College 2007	Sportswriter for ESPN and Sports Illustrated	
Kristen Welker (born 1977)	College 1998	News anchor NBC, host of Meet the Press	
Katharine Weymouth (born 1966)	College 1988	Washington Post publisher	
William Lindsay White (1900–1973)	College 1924	Journalist	
Jessica Yellin (born 1971)	College	Journalist	
Mort Zuckerman (born 1937)	Law 1962	U.S. News & World Report editor-in-chief, New York Daily News owner and publisher	

== Literature ==
Name	Class year	Notability	Reference(s)
Horatio Alger Jr. (1832–1899)	College 1852	Novelist	
Tahmima Anam (born 1975)	Phd 2005	Novelist	
Michael J. Arlen (born 1930)	College 1952	Writer, journalist, critic	
Margaret Atwood (born 1939)	Radcliffe A.M. 1962	Novelist	
Peter Benchley (1940–2006)	College 1961	Novelist	
Robert Benchley (1889–1945)	College 1912	Comedian	
John Berendt (born 1939)	College 1961	Writer	
Robert Bly (born 1926)	College 1950	Poet	
Marita Bonner (1899–1971)	Radcliffe College 1922	Harlem Renaissance writer, essayist, poet	
Bill Branon	College 1959	Novelist	
Harold Brodkey (1930–1996)	College 1952	Novelist	
George Hardin Brown	College 1971	Medieval scholar	
Thomas Bulfinch (1796–1867)	College 1814	Mythologist	
William S. Burroughs (1914–1997)	College 1936	Writer	
Ethan Canin (born 1960)	Medical 1989	Author	
Karla Cornejo Villavicencio	College 2011	Writer	
Steven R. Covey (1932–2012)	Business 1975	Author and self-help guru	
Michael Crichton (1942–2008)	College 1964; Medical 1969	Novelist, best known for Jurassic Park and the television series ER	
E. E. Cummings (1894–1962)	College 1915; A.M. 1916	Poet	
Henry Wadsworth Longfellow Dana (1881–1950)	College 1903; A.M. 1904; PhD 1910	Literary scholar, writer, activist	
Guy Davenport (1927–2005)	PhD	Writer, artist, critic	
Paul de Man (1919–1983)	PhD 1960	literary critic	
Joseph Dennie (1768–1812)	College 1790	Author, editor	
John dos Passos (1896–1970)	College 1916	Novelist	
Edward Eager (1911–1964)	College c. 1932	Writer of children's literature	
Ralph Waldo Emerson (1803–1882)	College 1821; Divinity 1829	Writer, namesake of Emerson Hall	
Berry Fleming (1899–1989)	College 1922	Novelist	
Al Franken (born 1951)	College 1973	Comedian, United States Senator	
Robert Frost (1874–1963)	College 1897 to 1899, dropped out	Poet	
Edward Gorey (1925–2000)	College 1950	Writer, illustrator	
Alfred Grossman (born 1927)	1949	Writer and novelist	
Donald Hall (1928–2018)	College 1951	14th U.S. Poet Laureate	
Louisa Hall (born 1982)	College 2004	Author	
James D. Hart (1911–1990)		Writer, professor	
Mark Helprin (born 1947)	College, Graduate School	Writer	
Julie Hilden	College 1989	Author	
Oliver Wendell Holmes Sr. (1809–1894)	College; PhD 1836; professor	Poet, physician	
Amanda Gorman	College 2020	Poet, activist	
Angela Hur	College 2002	Author	
Gregg Hurwitz	College 1995	Novelist, comics writer	
Uzodinma Iweala (born 1982)	College 2004	Author	
Gish Jen (born 1955)	College 1977	Author	
Helen Keller (1880–1968)	Radcliffe 1904	Deafblind author, activist, and lecturer	
H.T. Kirby-Smith (born 1938)	A.M. 1964	Poet and author	
Maxine Kumin (1925–2014)	College 1946; A.M. 1948	Poet	
Benjamin Kunkel (born 1972)	College 1996	Novelist, co-founder of n+1	
Jean Kwok	College	Author	
Sally Laird (1956–2010)	MA 1981	Writer, editor, translator	
Ursula K. Le Guin (1929–2018)	Radcliffe 1951	Novelist	
Hunter Lewis (born 1947)	A.B. 1969	Author	
Frederick Wadsworth Loring (1848–1871)	College 1870	Author, newspaper correspondent	
James Russell Lowell (1819–1891)	College 1838	Poet, abolitionist	
Alison Lurie (born 1926)	Radcliffe 1947	Novelist	
Norman Mailer (1923–2007)	College 1943	Novelist	
F.O. Matthiessen (1902–1950)	M.A. 1926 PhD 1927	Harvard teacher	
Anne McCaffrey (1926–2011)	Radcliffe 1947	Novelist	
Mary Lambeth Moore		novelist	
Julian Moynahan (1925–2014)	College 1946, PhD 1957	Critic and novelist	
Charles Murray (born 1943)	College 1965	Writer	
Ogden Nash (1902–1971)	College 1920	Poet	
Howard Nemerov (1920–1991)	College 1941	Poet	
Frank O'Hara (1926–1966)	College 1950	Poet	
Carl Phillips (born 1959)	College 1981	Poet	
George Plimpton (1927–2003)	College 1948	Writer, journalist, actor	
Adrienne Rich (1929–2012)	Radcliffe 1951	Poet	
George de la Ruiz Santayana (1863–1952)	College 1886	Philosopher, poet	
Rudy Ruiz (born 1968)	College 1990; M.P.P. 1993	Novelist and writer of short stories	
E. San Juan Jr. (born 1938)	A.M.; PhD	Poet, cultural scholar	
Erich Segal (1937–2010)	College 1958; A.M. 1959; PhD 1965	Author, screenwriter	
Frank Shuffelton (d. 2010)		Literary scholar	
Maximo V. Soliven (1929–2006)	PhD 1951	Writer, Chevalier (knight) of the National Order of Merit	
Susan Sontag (1933–2004)	A.M. 1957	Writer, activist	
Thomas Sowell (born 1930)	College 1958	Writer, economist	
Gertrude Stein (1874–1946)	Radcliffe 1897	Poet, novelist	
Ernest Thayer (1863–1940)	College 1885	Poet	
Henry David Thoreau (1817–1862)	College 1837	Journalist, philosopher, writer	
Sergio Troncoso (born 1961)	College 1983	Novelist and writer of short stories	
Lily Tuck (born 1938)	Radcliffe College 1960	Novelist, winner of the 2004 National Book Award.	
Scott Turow (born 1949)	Law 1978	Novelist, lawyer	
John Updike (1932–2009)	College 1954	Novelist	
Kaavya Viswanathan (born 1987)	College 2008	Novelist, noted plagiarist	
Andrew Weil (born 1942)	College 1964; Medical School 1968	Medical writer	
Richard Wilbur (1921–2017)	A.M. 1947; professor	Poet	
Lauren Willig (born 1977)	J.D. 2004	Novelist	
Thomas Wolfe (1900–1938)	A.M. 1922	Novelist	
John Burnham Schwartz (b. 1965)	A.B. 1987	Novelist, screenwriter	
Elizabeth Wurtzel (1967–2020)	College 1989	Writer	
Yangsze Choo		Fantasy novelist	

== Film, theater, and television ==
Name	Class year	Notability	Reference(s)
Tatyana Ali (born 1979)	College 2002	Actress, singer	
Jesse Andrews (born 1982)	College 2004	Novelist, screenwriter	
Darren Aronofsky (born 1969)	College 1991	Film director and screenwriter	
Ronald Bass (born 1942)	Law 1967	Screenwriter	
S. N. Behrman (1893–1973)	College 1916	Playwright, screenwriter	
Roberts Blossom (1924–2011)	College 1943	Actor, poet	
Andy Borowitz (born 1958)	College 1980	Comedian, film actor	
Josh Brener (born 1984)	College 2007	Actor	
Amy Brenneman (born 1964)	College 1987	Actress	
Bill Brown	College 1992	Experimental filmmaker	
Jared Bush (born 1974)	College 1996	Filmmaker, chief creative officer of Walt Disney Animation Studios	
Nestor Carbonell (born 1967)	College 1990	Actor	
Emily Carmichael (born 1982)	College 2004	Director, screenwriter, animator	
Stockard Channing (born 1944)	Radcliffe 1965	Actress	
Damien Chazelle (born 1985)	College 2007	Film director, screenwriter, Academy Award nominee for Whiplash and Academy Award winner for La La Land	
Karen Chee (born 1995)	College 2017	Comedian	
Rob Cohen (born 1949)	College 1971	Film director, screenwriter	
Cesar Conde (born 1973)	College 1995	President of Univision	
Lindsay Crouse (born 1948)	Radcliffe 1970	Actress	
R.J. Cutler (born 1962)	College 1983	Documentary producer, director	
Matt Damon (born 1970)	College 1988–92	Actor, screenwriter, producer, Academy Award winner	
Greg Daniels (born 1962)	College 1985	Comedy writer, producer, and director	
Nick Davis (born 1965)	College 1987	Producer, Director, author	
Nick DiGiovanni (born 1996)	College 2019	Chef and influencer (YouTube, TikTok)	
Jeremy Doner (born 1974)	College 1994	Screenwriter	
David Dorfman (born 1994)	Law 2015	Actor, attorney	
John Duda (born 1977)	College 1999	Actor	
Christopher Durang (born 1949)	College 1971	Playwright	
Olga Fedori (born 1984)	College 2004	Actress, singer	
David Frankel(born 1959)	College 1981	Filmmaker	
Geoffrey S. Fletcher (born 1970)	College 1992	Screenwriter, film director, professor	
Greg Giraldo (1965–2010)	Law 1988	Comedian	
Caroline Giuliani (born 1989)	College 2011	Filmmaker, writer; daughter of Rudy Giuliani and Donna Hanover	
Fred Grandy (born 1948)	College 1970	Actor; member, U.S. House of Representatives	
Andre Gregory (born 1934)	College 1956	Theatre director, actor	
Armando Gutierrez (born 1949)	Extension 2009	Actor, producer	
Fred Gwynne (1926–1993)	College 1951	Actor	
Hill Harper (born 1966)	HKS, Law 1992	Actor	
Erika Harold (born 1980)	Law 2007	Miss America 2003	
Sarah Haskins (born 1979)	College 2001	Comedian	
David Heyman (born 1961)	College 1983	Film producer	
Dawn Hudson (born c. 1957)	College	Chief executive officer of the Academy of Motion Picture Arts and Sciences	
Josephine Hull (1886–1957)	Radcliffe 1899	Actress, Academy Award winner	
Rashida Jones (born 1976)	College 1997	Actress	
Tommy Lee Jones (born 1946)	College 1969	Actor, Academy Award winner, All-Ivy League guard on football team in 1968	
Colin Jost (born 1982)	College 2004	Actor, writer, comedian	
Ashley Judd (born 1968)	HKS 2010 (Mid-Career MPA)	Actress	
Douglas Kenney (1947–1980)	College 1968	Humorist, screenwriter	
Aleen Keshishian (born 1968)	College 1990	Film producer, talent manager	
Alek Keshishian (born 1964)	College 1986	Film director, screenwriter	
Jack Lemmon (1925–2001)	College 1947	Actor, Academy Award winner	
Alan Jay Lerner (1918–1986)	College 1940	Lyricist, librettist	
Jeremy Leven (born 1941)	Education 1973	Novelist, screenwriter, director, producer	
John Lithgow (born 1945)	College 1967	Actor, Academy Award nominee	
Donal Logue (born 1966)	College 1989	Actor	
Joseph Losey (1909–1984)	A.M.	Film director	
Terrence Malick (born 1943)	College 1966	Film director, screenwriter	
Robert Myhrum (1927–1999)	College 1948	Emmy Award–nominated television director	
Dan McGrath (born 1965)	College 1985	Emmy Award–winning writer, Saturday Night Live, The Simpsons, King of the Hill	
Tom McGrath (born 1956)	College 1976, MBA 1980	Film and theater executive, producer; The Princess Bride, Stand by Me, Hair, Passing Strange, West Side Story; eight-time Tony Award winner; president, Paramount Pictures 1994–2005	
Abel Meeropol (1903–1986)		Actor and composer	
Alex Michel (born 1970)	College 1992	Businessman, television personality; The Bachelor	
David Monahan (born 1971)	College	Actor	
Mira Nair (born 1957)	College 1979	Film director	
Dean Norris (born 1963)	College 1985	Actor, Breaking Bad, Under the Dome	
B. J. Novak (born 1979)	College 2001	Comedian, actor, The Office	
Conan O'Brien (born 1963)	College 1985	Actor, comedian, talk-show host, writer	
Mark O'Donnell (1954–2012)	College 1976	Comedy writer, Tony Award winner for Hairspray, author, op-ed columnist	
Steve O'Donnell (born 1954)	College 1976	Comedy writer, multiple Emmy Award winner, head writer for The David Letterman Show, The Simpsons	
Lance Oppenheim (born 1996)	College 2019	Film director	
Roberto Patino (born 1984)	College 2006	Screenwriter	
Keir Pearson (born 1968)	College 1989	Screenwriter	
Frank Pierson (1925–2012)	College 1950	Screenwriter, film director	
Natalie Portman (born 1981)	College 2003	Actress, Academy Award winner	
Carol Potter (born 1948)	Social Relations (Psychology) 1970	Actress, Beverly Hills, 90210	
Julia Riew	College 2022	Composer, librettist, lyricist	
Geneva Robertson-Dworet (born 1985)	College 2007	Screenwriter	
Mo Rocca (born 1969)	College 1991	Comedian	
Peter Sagal (born 1965)	College 1987	Host of NPR's Wait Wait... Don't Tell Me!	
Nat Sakdatorn (born 1983)	College c.2005	Actor	
Meredith Salenger (born 1970)	College 1992	Actress	
Michael Schur (born 1975)	College 1997	Writer for Saturday Night Live, The Office, and Parks and Recreation	
Peter Sellars (born 1957)	College 1980	Theater director	
Yara Shahidi (born 2000)	College 2022	Actress, producer	
Wallace Shawn (born 1943)	College 1965	Actor, playwright	
Elisabeth Shue (born 1963)	College 2000	Actress	
Henry Singer (born 1957)	College 1980	Film director	
Mira Sorvino (born 1967)	College 1990	Actress, Academy Award winner	
Whit Stillman (born 1952)	College 1973	Screenwriter, film director	
Renee Tajima-Peña (born 1958)	College 1980	Film director and producer, Who Killed Vincent Chin?	
Sooni Taraporevala (born 1957)	College 1979	Screenwriter	
Jonathan Taylor Thomas (born 1981)	College 2004	Actor	
Scottie Thompson (born 1981)	College 2005	Actress	
James Toback (born 1944)	College 1966	Film director and screenwriter	
Bitsie Tulloch (born 1981)	College 2003	Actress	
Brian Tyler (born 1972)	College 1998	Film composer and music producer	
Jack Valenti (1921–2007)	Business 1952	President of the Motion Picture Association of America (MPAA)	
Courtney B. Vance (born 1960)	College 1982	Actor	
John Weidman (born 1946)	College 1968	Librettist	
Scott Weinger (born 1975)	College 1998	Actor	
Steve Zahn (born 1967)		Actor	
Jeff Zucker (born 1965)	College 1986	President of NBC Universal	
Edward Zwick (born 1952)	College 1974	Film director, producer, Academy Award winner	
Bill Stetson	B.A. 1982	founding president, Vermont Film Commission; producer, What We Want, What We Believe: The Black Panther Party Library; Citizen Suits; and A Closer Walk	
Nuseir Yassin (born 1992)	College 2014	Web-based personality	

== Music ==
Name	Class year	Notability	Reference(s)
John Adams (born 1947)	College 1965	Composer	
Rivers Cuomo (born 1970)	College 1995; MA	Rock musician	
Samuel Hans Adler (born 1928)	College 1950; MA	Composer, conductor	
Charlie Albright	College 2011	Pianist, composer	
Leroy Anderson (1908–1975)	College 1929; A.M. 1930	Composer, conductor	
Masi Asare (born 20th century)	College; A.B. Performance Studies	Tony Award–nominated composer	
Matthew Aucoin (born 1990)	College 2012	Composer, conductor, pianist; known for his operas	
Haley Bennett (born 1993)	College 2009	Conductor, music director, arranger	
Leonard Bernstein (1918–1990)	College 1939	Composer, conductor	
Alison Brown (born 1962)	College 1983	Grammy Award–winning banjo player, guitarist, composer, and producer	
Elliott Carter (1908–2012)	College 1931	Composer, Pulitzer Prize winner	
Del Castillo (1893–1992)	College 1914	Organist, composer	
Han-na Chang (born 1982)	College 2001	Cellist	
William Christie (born 1944)	College 1966	Conductor	
Rivers Cuomo (born 1970)	College 2006	Singer of Grammy Award–winning band Weezer	
Du Yun (born 1977)	Ph.D. 2006	Composer, performance artist, Pulitzer Prize winner	
Elephante (born Tim Heng Wu, 1989)	College 2011, Economics	Music producer and DJ	
China Forbes (born 1970)	College 1992	Singer; lead vocalist of Pink Martini	
Elliot Forbes (1917–2006)	College 1941; A.M. 1947	Conductor, musicologist	
Russ Gershon (born 1959)	College 1981/82	Jazz saxophonist, composer, bandleader	
Alan Gilbert (born 1967)	College 1989	Music director of the New York Philharmonic	
Aaron Goldberg (born 1974)	College 1996	Jazz pianist	
Jerry Harrison (born 1949)	College 1971	Keyboardist for Talking Heads	
Sarah Hicks (born 1970 or 1971)	College 1993	Orchestra conductor	
Fred Ho (born 1957)	College 1979	Jazz baritone saxophonist, composer, and bandleader	
Samuel Holyoke (1762–1820)	College 1789, A.M. 1792	Composer	
Nian Hu (born 1996 or 1997)	College 2018	Guitarist and singer	
Justin Hurwitz (born 1985)	College 2003	Composer, pianist, and screenwriter; Academy Award winner for La La Land	
Stefan Jackiw (born 1985)	College 2007	Violinist	
Janani K. Jha	College 2020	singer, songwriter, producer, Survivor contestant	
Jacob Kimball (1761–1826)	College 1780	Composer	
Thomas M. Lauderdale (born 1970)	College 1992	Musician, frontman of Pink Martini	
Sara Lazarus	College 1984	Jazz vocalist	
Trey Chui-yee Lee (born 1973)	College 1997	Cellist	
Tom Lehrer (1928–2025)	College 1946; A.M. 1947	Satirist, mathematician, singer	
Ryan Leslie (born 1978)	College 1994	Music producer, singer-songwriter, musical arranger	
Yo-Yo Ma (born 1955)	College 1976	Cellist	
Daniel Manzano (born 1980)	College 1999	Bassist, percussionist, backing vocals, and songwriter for Boyce Avenue	
Harper MacKay (1921–1995)		Music director of the Los Angeles Civic Light Opera, pianist, conductor, and composer of scores for film and television	
Lorenzo Mariani	College 1977	International opera stage director, artistic director, and educator; based in Italy	
Tom Morello (born 1964)	College 1986	Lead guitarist of the Grammy Award–winning band Rage Against the Machine; ex-lead guitarist of the now-defunct band Audioslave; political activist	
Dmitri Nabokov (1934–2012)	College 1955	Opera singer, son of Vladimir Nabokov	
Ursula Oppens (born 1944)	Radcliffe 1965	Pianist	
William P. Perry (born 1930)	College 1951	Composer	
Joshua Redman (born 1969)	College 1991	Jazz saxophonist	
Frederic Rzewski (1938–2021)	College 1958	Composer, pianist	
Anton Schwartz (born 1967)	College 1989	Jazz saxophonist	
Robert Strassburg (1915–2003)	A.M. 1950	Conductor, composer, professor of music, musicologist	
Michael Stern (born 1959)	College 1981	Conductor, Kansas City Symphony	
Kevin Sun (born 1991 or 1992)	College	Jazz saxophonist and composer	
Brian Tyler (born 1972)	College 1998	Film composer, music producer, conductor, pianist, drummer, guitarist, multi-instrumentalist	
Dan Wilson (born 1961)	College 1983	Musician, singer in the band Semisonic; known for the song "Closing Time"	
Peter Wollny (born 1961)		Musicologist, Bach Archive Leipzig	

== Art, architecture, and engineering ==
Name	Class year	Notability	Reference(s)
Waldron Phoenix Belknap Jr. (1899–1949)	College 1920; MA 1933	Art historian, architect, namesake of Belknap Press	
Ann Bermingham (born 1948)	PhD 1982	Art historian	
Barbara Bestor (born 1966)	College 1987	Architect	
Sheila Blair (born 1948)	PhD 1980	Art historian	
Anna Campbell Bliss (1925–2015)	1951	Artist and architect	
Jonathan M. Bloom (born 1950)	College 1972; PhD 1980	Art historian, assistant professor of art history (1981–1987)	
Henry Clifford Boles (1910–1979)	M.Arch 1949	African American architect, active in Liberia and Massachusetts	
Louis Briel (1945–2021)	MA 1960s–1970s	Artist and author	
Charles Bulfinch (1763–1844)	College 1781	Architect	
Rika Burnham		Museum Educator, dancer and PROSE Award winner	
Geoffrey Chadsey (born 1967)	A.B. 1989	Artist	
Kermit S. Champa (1939–2004)	PhD 1965	Art historian, Andrea V. Rosenthal Professor of the History of Art and Architecture at Brown University	
Coker Fifield Clarkson (1870–1930)	A.B. 1894	General manager of the Society of Automotive Engineers	
Kate Cordsen (born 1966)	A.M. 1998	Photographer, Artist	
Allan Crite (1910–2007)	Extension 1968	Artist	
Hardy Cross (1885–1959)	MCE 1911	Civil engineer	
James Cuno (born 1951)	A.M. 1980; PhD 1985	Art historian, director of the Harvard Art Museums	
Frederick B. Deknatel (1905–1973)	PhD 1935	Art historian, William Door Boardman Professor of Fine Arts at Harvard University	
Walter B. Denny	A.M. 1965; PhD 1971	Art historian, University Distinguished Professor of Art History at the University of Massachusetts Amherst	
Henri Dorra (1924–2002)	A.M. 1950; PhD 1954	Art historian, Professor Emeritus of Art History at the University of California, Santa Barbara	
Dan Estabrook (born 1969)	College 1990	Photographer	
Massumeh Farhad	PhD 1987	Art historian, curator at Chief Curator and Curator of Islamic Art at the Freer Gallery of Art and Arthur M. Sackler Gallery at the Smithsonian Institution National Museum of Asian Art	
Cécile Fromont	A.M. 2004; PhD 2008	Art historian, Associate Professor of African and South Atlantic Art at Yale University	
Buckminster Fuller	1917; Expelled	Architect, systems theorist, writer, designer, inventor, philosopher, futurist	
Joseph Goldyne (born 1942)	College 1970	Artist, printmaker, curator	
Lauren Greenfield (born 1966)	College 1987	Artist, Photographer, Filmmaker	
Gulgee (1926–2007)	College 1947	Pakistani artist famous for his paintings and Islamic calligraphy; qualified engineer	
Philip Johnson (1906–2005)	College 1930	Architect, Pritzker Prize winner	
Julian Hatton (born 1956)	College 1979	Artist, abstract landscapes	
Jarvis Hunt (1863–1941)		Architect	
Charles L. Kuhn (1901–1985)	A.M. 1924; PhD 1929	Art historian, director of the Busch-Reisinger Museum	
Thomas W. Lentz (born 1951)	A.M. 1981; PhD 1985	Art historian, director of the Harvard Art Museums	
Fumihiko Maki (born 1928)	Design 1955	Architect, Pritzker Prize winner	
Howard Hibbard (1928–1984)	PhD 1958	Art historian, Professor of Italian Baroque Art at Columbia University	
Elizabeth Holloway Marston (1893–1993)	Radcliffe A.M. 1921	Involved in the creation of the comic book character Wonder Woman	
Thom Mayne (born 1944)	Design 1978	Architect, Pritzker Prize winner	
Malcolm McKesson (1909–1999)	College 1933	Outsider artist	
Philippe de Montebello (born 1936)	College 1962	Director of the Metropolitan Museum of Art	
I. M. Pei (1917–2019)	Design 1946	Architect, Pritzker Prize winner	
Jules Prown (born 1930)	A.M. 1953, PhD 1961	Art historian, Professor of Art History Emeritus at Yale University	
Henry Hobson Richardson (1838–1886)	College 1859	Architect	
Scott Rothkopf (born 1976)	College 1999	Art historian, Curator at the Whitney Museum of American Art	
Kenneth Dupee Swan (1887–1970)		Photographer, forester	
Gary Tinterow (born 1953)	A.M. 1983	Art historian, director of the Museum of Fine Arts, Houston	
Oliver Samuel Tonks (1874–1953)	A.B. 1898, A.M. 1899, Ph.D. 1903	Art historian, Professor of Art History Emeritus at Vassar College	
Edward Warburg (1908–1992)	1930	Philanthropist, patron of the arts	
Harold Wethey (1902–1984)	A.M. 1931; PhD 1934	Art historian, professor at the University of Michigan	

== Religion ==
Name	Class year	Notability	Reference(s)
Wendy Amsellem	College	Orthodox rabba and scholar	
George Arthur Buttrick (1892–1980)	Faculty member in 1955	Professor of Christian Morals	
William Ellery Channing (1780–1842)	College 1798	Unitarian leader	
Jane Dempsey Douglass (born 1933)	PhD 1963	Feminist theologian and ecclesiastical historian; president of the World Alliance of Reformed Churches	
Shubael Dummer (1636–1692)	College 1656	Founder of the First Parish Congregational Church of York, the oldest church congregation in the state of Maine; killed in the Candlemas Massacre	
John Hale (1636–1700)	College 1657 (Theology Degree)	Participant in the Salem witch trials who would later apologize for his role; first minister of the parish church in Beverly, Massachusetts	
Edward William Cornelius Humphrey (1844–1917)	Law 1866	Presbyterian leader, lawyer and judge	
Karim Aga Khan IV (born 1936)	College 1958	Spiritual leader of Shia Ismaili branch of Islam	
Bernard Francis Law (1931–2017)	College 1953	Cardinal Archbishop of Boston	
Aharon Lichtenstein (1933–2015)	PhD English	Chief rabbi at Yeshivat Har Etzion in the West Bank; son-in-law and disciple of Rabbi Joseph B. Soloveitchik	
Walter A. Maier (1893–1950)	M.A. 1920, PhD 1929	Professor at Concordia Seminary, first speaker of The Lutheran Hour	
Cotton Mather (1663–1728)	College 1678, A.M. 1681	Minister, author	
Increase Mather (1639–1723)	College 1656	Clergyman	
Robert W. McElroy (born 1954)	College 1975	American Roman Catholic Cardinal designate, sixth bishop of the Roman Catholic Diocese of San Diego	
Seyyed Hossein Nasr (born 1933)	Divinity	Muslim philosopher, leading exponent of the Perennial Philosophy leader	
Fan S. Noli (1882–1965)	D.D. 1908	Clergyman, founder of the Albanian Orthodox Church	
Theodore Parker (1810–1860)	Divinity	Unitarian leader	
Samuel Phillips (1690–1771)	College 1708	First pastor of the South Church in Andover, Massachusetts	
Adam Shoemaker		Episcopal clergyman	
William G. Sinkford (born 1946)	College 1968	Unitarian Universalist leader	
Joshua Toulmin (1740–1815)	D.D. 1794	English radical dissenting minister	

== Athletics ==
Name	Class year	Notability	Reference(s)
Craig Adams (born 1977)	College 1999	NHL player, Pittsburgh Penguins	
Eugene Belisle (1910–1983)	College 1931	Coxwain at 1928 Summer Olympics	
Matt Birk (born 1976)	College 1998	NFL center	
Brian Burke (born 1955)	MBA/JD 1981	NHL general manager	
Dick Button (born 1929)	AB 1952 JD 1955	Figure skater, two-time Olympic gold medalist 1948/1954, five-time world champion, seven-time national champion	
Ellery Harding Clark (1874–1949)	College 1896	Two-time gold medalist at 1896 Summer Olympics	
Emily Cross (born 1986)	College 2009	Silver medalist in fencing at 2008 Summer Olympics	
Clifton Dawson (born 1983)	College 2007	NFL player, Indianapolis Colts	
Jillian Dempsey (born 1991)	College 2013	Ice hockey player	
Eli Dershwitz (born 1995)	College 2019	2023 Saber World Champion, 2015 Saber Junior World Champion, competitor for US in fencing at the 2016 Summer Olympics and the 2020 Summer Olympics	
John Dockery (born 1944)	College 1968	NFL cornerback	
Ted Donato (born 1969)	College 1991	NHL player, head hockey coach	
Chandler Egan (1884–1936)	College 1905	Gold and silver medalist in golf at 1904 Summer Olympics	
Ali Farag (born 1992)	College 2014	Squash player, highest world ranking of no. 1	
Adam Fox (born 1998)	College 2020	NHL player, New York Rangers	
Ryan Fitzpatrick (born 1982)	College 2005	NFL quarterback, St. Louis Rams, Cincinnati Bengals, Buffalo Bills, New York Jets, Tampa Bay Buccaneers, Miami Dolphins, Washington Commanders.	
Eddie Grant (1883–1918)	College 1905, Law 1909	MLB infielder, Cleveland Indians, Philadelphia Phillies, Cincinnati Reds, New York Giants	
Milton Green (1913–2005)	College	Runner, former world recorder holder in hurdles	
Peter Gregg (1940–1981)	College 1961	Racing driver	
Aaron Molyneaux Hewlett (1820–1871)		First superintendent of physical education in American higher education	
Arnold Horween (1898–1985)	College 1921	American football All-American player for the Harvard Crimson and the NFL; Harvard coach	
Ralph Horween (1896–1997)	College 1920 and Law School 1929	American football All-American player for the Harvard Crimson and the NFL; centenarian	
Bobby Jones (1902–1971)	College 1924	Golfer	
Dan Jiggetts (born 1954)	College 1976	NFL offensive tackle, Chicago sportscaster	
Isaiah Kacyvenski (born 1977)	College 2000, HBS 2011	NFL player, Seattle Seahawks, St. Louis Rams, Oakland Raiders	
William Kwok (born 1972)	DCE ALM 2007	Martial Artist, Recipient of the President's Council on Sports, Fitness, and Nutrition Community Leadership Award	
Marv Levy (born 1925)	College	NFL coach, Kansas City Chiefs, Buffalo Bills	
Jeremy Lin (born 1988)	College 2010	NBA player, Charlotte Hornets, Brooklyn Nets	
Ada Lio (born 1974)		Pool player and rare disease advocate	
Esther Lofgren (born 1986)	College 2009	Gold medalist in rowing at 2012 Summer Olympics	
Rob Manfred (born 1958)	Law 1983	Commissioner of Major League Baseball	
Shep Messing (born 1949)	College 1973	Soccer player	
Noam Mills (born 1986)	College 2012; MBA 2016	Olympic épée fencer for Israel at 2008 Summer Olympics	
Dominic Moore (born 1980)	College	NHL player, Toronto Maple Leafs, Buffalo Sabres, San Jose Sharks	
Steve Moore (born 1978)	College	NHL player, Colorado Avalanche	
Christopher Nowinski (born 1978)	College 2000	Professional wrestler	
Jeffrey Orridge (born 1960)	Law 1986	Commissioner of the Canadian Football League	
David Otunga (born 1980)	2006	Professional wrestler	
John Paul (born 1939)	MBA	Sportscar racing driver	
Pieter Quinton (born 1998)	College 2020	Bronze medalist in rowing for Team USA at the 2024 Summer Olympics.	
Dylan Reese (born 1984)	College	NHL player, New York Islanders	
Robert Ridder (1919–2000)		Lester Patrick Trophy recipient, United States Hockey Hall of Fame inductee	
Ryan Max Riley (born 1979)	College 2007	United States Ski Team skier	
Gabrielle Thomas (born 1996)	College 2018	Bronze medalist in 200m at the 2020 Summer Olympics	
Larry Scott (born 1964)	College 1986	WTA CEO, Pac-10 commissioner	
Richard Sears (1861–1943)	College 1883	Seven-time US Open champion	
Lou Silver (born 1953)	College 1975	American-Israeli basketball player	
Ed Smith (1929–1998)		Former NBA player, New York Knicks	
David Stearns (born 1985)	College 2007	Milwaukee Brewers general manager	
Patrick Staropoli (born 1989)	College 2012	NASCAR driver (Big Machine Racing) and ophthalmologist	
Siddharth Suchde (born 1985)	College 2007	Former squash player, highest world ranking of no. 39	
Andrew Sudduth (1961–2006)	College 1983	Silver medalist in rowing at 1984 Summer Olympics	
Seth Towns	College 2020	former college basketball player and current assistant coach for Harvard Crimson	
Malcolm Turner	JD/MBA	Athletic director at Vanderbilt University	
Benjamin (Benji) Ungar (born 1986)		Fencer, NCAA champion, Harvard Male Athlete of the Year 2006	
Noah Welch (born 1982)	College 2005	NHL player, Florida Panthers	
Keith Wright (born 1989)	College 2012	2010–11 Ivy League Men's Basketball Player of the Year	
Paul Wylie (born 1964)	College 1991	Figure skater	
Jimmy Vesey (born 1993)	College 2016	NHL player, New York Rangers	

- Spencer Freedman (born 1998), college basketball player for the Harvard Crimson and NYU Violets
- Ross Friedman (born 1992), Major League Soccer player
- Elizabeth Tartakovsky (born 2000), Olympic saber fencer
- Michael Zimmerman (born 1970), tennis player, 2x Ivy League Player of the Year

== Criminals ==
Name	Class year	Notability	Reference(s)
Sinedu Tadesse (born 1975)	Harvard College class of 1996	Murderer	
John Connolly	1967 Harvard Kennedy School	Mobster and former FBI agent, associate of the Winter Hill Gang, convicted of racketeering and second degree murder	
Marc Stuart Dreier (born 1950)	Juris Doctor Harvard Law School 1975	Securities fraud	
Paul Bilzerian (born 1950)	MBA 1975	Securities Fraud	
Rajat Gupta (born 1948)	MBA 1973	Securities Fraud, Conspiracy	
Ted Kaczynski (1942–2023)	College 1962	Unabomber terrorist, murderer	
Viktor Kozeny (born 1963)	College 1989	Fugitive financier	
William Leonard Pickard (born 1945)	Harvard Kennedy School 1996	LSD manufacturer	
Eugene Plotkin	College 2000	Convicted of insider trading	
Louis Agassiz Shaw II (1906–1987)	Class of 1929	Murderer	
Jeffrey Skilling (born 1953)	Business 1979	Conspiracy, making false statements, insider trading, and securities fraud during the Enron case	
Chuck Turner (1940–2019)	College 1963	Convicted felon and former Boston City Council member	
John White Webster (1793–1850)	College 1811	Murderer	
Richard Whitney (1888–1974)		Embezzler	
Stephen H. Kessler (born 1935)	Medical 1957	"Mad LSD Slayer" of 1967	

== Academics ==
=== Educational institution founders and presidents ===
Name	Class year	Notability	Reference(s)
William Allen (1784–1968)	College 1802	President of Bowdoin College	
Richard E. Berendzen (born 1938)	PhD 1967	President, The American University	
Thomas W. Butcher (1867–1947)	M.A. 1904	President of Kansas State Teachers College (now Emporia State University) from 1913 to 1943	
James Bryant Conant (1893–1978)	College 1914, PhD 1916	23rd President of Harvard University	
Walter William Spencer Cook (1888–1924)	B.A. 1913, M.A. 1915, PhD 1924	Co-founder of the New York University Institute of Fine Arts, 1935	
William R. Cotter	College 1958, Law 1961	18th President of Colby College	
Claudio Demattè (1942–2004)	Business 1970	Founder, SDA Bocconi	
Shih Choon Fong (born 1945)	PhD 1973	First President of King Abdullah University of Science and Technology	
Alan Garber (born 1955)	College 1977, AM 1977, PhD 1982	31st president of Harvard University	
Clifton D. Gray (1875–1944)	College 1897	President of Bates College	
David C. Hardesty	Law 1973	President of West Virginia University	
Yoshito Hori (born 1962)	MBA	Founder of Globis University Graduate School of Management	
William DeWitt Hyde (1858–1917)	College 1879	President of Bowdoin College	
Beong-Soo Kim (born 1972)	AB 1994, JD 1999	13th President of the University of Southern California	
Jonathan Koppell (born 1970)	AB 1993	10th President of Montclair State University	
Heather Knight	Doctorate	21st President of Pacific Union College	
Robert B. Lawton (born 1947)	PhD 1977	President, Loyola Marymount University	
John Clarence Lee (1856–1940)	AB 1878	President of St. Lawrence University and Lombard University	
Edith Lesley (1872–1953)	Radcliffe College 1908	Founder of Lesley University	
Daniel Little (born 1949)	Philosophy	Chancellor of University of Michigan-Dearborn	
Alexandra W. Logue		Provost of New York Institute of Technology	
Stephen W. Nease (1925–2006)	Divinity	President of the Eastern Nazarene College 1981–89	
Laurie L. Patton (born 1961)	BA, 1983	17th President of Middlebury College	
M. Lee Pelton (born 1950)	PhD 1984, Senior Tutor of Winthrop House	President of Willamette University	
Marvin Banks Perry Jr. (1918–1994)	MA 1941; PhD 1950	President of Goucher College and Agnes Scott College	
Ruth J. Person	Institute of Educational Management 1989	Chancellor, University of Michigan (Flint Campus)	
Charles F. Phillips (1910–1998)	PhD	Economist, president of Bates College	
John Phillips (1719–1795)	B.A., M.A.	Founder of Phillips Exeter Academy	
William C. Powers (1946–2019)	JD 1973	President of The University of Texas at Austin	
L. Song Richardson (1966/67)	B.A.	President of Colorado College (2021-Present)	
Louise Richardson (born 1958)	PhD 1989	First female vice-chancellor of the University of St Andrews and first female vice-chancellor of the University of Oxford	
Mark Roosevelt (born 1955)	B.A. from Harvard University; Law degree from Harvard Law School	President of Antioch College, Yellow Springs Ohio; great-grandson of Theodore Roosevelt, Class of 1980	
Jonathan Rosenbaum (born 1947)	PhD	President of Gratz College	
Katherine A. Rowe	PhD 1992	28th and first female president of the College of William and Mary; graduate of Carleton College	
Fred J. Shields	Education	President of the Eastern Nazarene College 1919–23	
Phillip Shriver (1922–2011)		President of Miami University Ohio; graduate of Yale University and Columbia University	
Andrew Sledd (1870–1939)	M.A. Greek 1896	First president of the University of Florida, 1905–09	
David J. Steinberg	College; A.M.; PhD	President of Long Island University	
Robert E. L. Strider (1917–2010)	College 1939	17th president of Colby College	
Sanford J. Ungar (born 1945)		10th president of Goucher College	
John William Ward	BA 1945	President of Amherst College, Chairman of the Ward Commission	
Peggy R. Williams	Education 1983	President of Ithaca College	
George W. Webber (1920–2010)	College 1942	President of the New York Theological Seminary	
John Philip Wernette (1903–1988)	M.A. 1929, PhD 1932	President of the University of New Mexico	

- Yoram Ben-Porat (1937–1992), Israeli economist and President of the Hebrew University of Jerusalem
- Shlomo Eckstein (1929–2020), Israeli economist and President of Bar-Ilan University
- Amos Eiran, Israeli President of the University of Haifa
- Yosef Tekoah (1925–1991), Ph.D., Israeli President of the Ben-Gurion University of the Negev

=== Professors and scholars ===
Name	Class year	Notability	Reference(s)
David Benjamin Oppenheimer	J.D. 1978	Clinical Professor of Law at UC Berkeley Law School. Faculty Co-Director of the Pro Bono Program and the Director of the Berkeley Center on Comparative Equality & Anti-discrimination Law.	
M.H. Abrams (1912–2015)	A.B. 1934, A.M. 1937, PhD 1940	Literary theorist and critic, Class of 1916 Professor of English at Cornell University	
Encarnacion Alzona (1895–2001)	Radcliffe 1920	Historian; National Scientist of the Philippines; first Filipino woman to receive a Ph.D; member of the University of the Philippines System Board of Regents	
Herman Vandenburg Ames (1865–1935)	PhD 1891	Historian; inaugural recipient of the Justin Winsor Prize	
Sylvan Barnet (1926–2016)	PhD 1954	Shakespearean scholar	
George E. Bates (1902–1992)	M.B.A. 1925	Professor of Investment Management at the Harvard Business School; editor of the Harvard Business Review	
Robert Percy Barnes (1898–1990)	PhD 1933	Professor of chemistry at Howard University. First African American person to graduate from Harvard with a PhD with chemistry.	
Bernard Berenson (1865–1959)	College 1887	Art historian	
Ann Bergren (1942–2018)	PhD 1973	Professor of Greek Literature; first woman classicist to gain tenure at UCLA	
Luciano Berio (1925–2003)	1994 Distinguished Composer in Residence	Composer	
Michael Beschloss (born 1955)	Business 1980	Historian	
David Bevington (1931–2019)	PhD 1958	Scholar	
John Boswell (1947–1994)	PhD 1975	Historian of homosexual history	
Jean Briggs (1929–2016)	PhD 1967	Anthropologist, ethnographer and expert on Inuit languages; compiled the world's first Utkuhiksalingmiut Inuktitut dictionary (2015)	
Schuyler V. Cammann (1921–1991)	A.M. 1941	Anthropologist	
Lester J. Cappon (1900–1981)	A.M. and PhD 1928	Historian, documentary editor, and archivist for Colonial Williamsburg	
Robert Castelli (born 1949)	A.M. 1996	Criminal Justice Department Chair at Iona College, New York State Assemblyman	
Charles B. Chang	A.B./A.M. 2003	Professor of Linguistics at the City University of Hong Kong	
Yuen Ren Chao (1892–1982)	PhD 1918	Chinese American linguist, philosopher and amateur composer	
John Leonard Clive (1924–1990)	PhD 1952	Historian, winner of the 1974 National Book Award for Biography	
Kate Cooper (born 1960)	MTS	Professor of Ancient History	
Thomas E. Cravens	1975	Physicist, explained cometary x-ray emission; University of Kansas	
Anna Crone	1975	Professor of Slavic Languages and Literatures; University of Chicago	
Donald Davidson (1917–2003)	PhD	Philosopher	
Joseph R. D'Cruz	PhD 1979	Professor of strategic management at the University of Toronto's Rotman School of Management	
Greg Dening (1931–2008)	PhD	Historian, scholar of historical ethnography	
Martina Deuchler (born 1935)	PhD 1967	Professor of Korean Studies, School of Oriental and African Studies, University of London	
Margaret A. Dix (1939–2025)	PhD 1968	Botanist, taxonomist, director of the biology department at the Universidad del Valle de Guatemala	
John Enemark	A.M. 1964, Ph.D. 1966	Bioinorganic chemist and professor	
Lia Epperson	A.B. with magna cum laude in sociology	Professor of Law, civil rights lawyer; American University Washington College of Law	
John K. Fairbank (1907–1991)	College 1929	East Asian scholar	
Ben Finney (1933–2017)	PhD 1964	Anthropologist, author, Polynesian Voyaging Society co-founder	
Richard Thornton Fisher (1876–1934)	College 1898	Forester, founding director of the Harvard Forest	
M. Judah Folkman (1933–2008)	1953	Founder of angiogenesis research	
Mary Parker Follett (1868–1933)	Radcliffe 1898	Social and political theorist	
Richard Foltz (born 1961)	PhD 1996	Historian of religions	
James Fowler (born 1970)	College 1992; PhD 2003	Political scientist	
Gerald Frug	LL.B 1963	Louis D. Brandeis Professor of Law at Harvard Law School.	
Timothy S. George (born 1955)	A.M. 1993; PhD 1996	Professor in East and Southeast Asian History, University of Rhode Island	
Charles Harvard Gibbs-Smith (1909–1981)	A.M. 1932	Historian	
Anne Goldgar	M.A.; PhD	Historian, author	
Nelson Goodman (1906–1998)	A.B. 1928; PhD 1941	Philosopher	
Robert A. Gorman (born 1937)	1989	Professor; University of Pennsylvania School of Law	
Nancy Guerra (born 1950)	Ed.D 1986	Psychologist and dean of the School of Social Ecology at the University of California, Irvine	
Philip F. Gura (born 1950)	A.B. 1972; PhD 1977	Leading scholar on American history and literature	
Patricia Greenspan	A.M. 1968; PhD 1972	Professor of Philosophy at the University of Maryland, College Park	
Lewis A. Grossman	Juris Doctor, 1990	Professor of Law at the Washington College of Law	
Valerie Hansen (born 1958)	A.B. 1979	Stanley Woodward Professor of History, Yale University	
Harlan P. Hanson (1925–1996)	A.B. 1948; PhD 1959	Director of the Advanced Placement program (1965–1989)	
George Haskins (1915–1991)	A.B. 1935; J.D. 1942	Law professor at the University of Pennsylvania Law School	
KC Johnson (born 1967)	A.B. 1988; PhD 1993	Professor of History at Brooklyn College and the City University of New York, known for his work exposing the facts about the Duke lacrosse case	
T.R. Kidder (born 1960)	PhD 1989	Archaeologist, Dean, Tulane University	
Gary N. Knoppers (1956–2018)	A.M. 1986; PhD 1988	Leading scholar on Chronicles and Chronicler	
Robert A. Kraft (born 1934)	PhD 1961	Leading scholar on Jewish history and Christian origins	
Rosalind E. Krauss (born 1941)	PhD 1969	Art historian and founder of academic journal October	
Alan Kreider (1941–2017)	A.M. (1965), PhD (1971), Travelling Fellow (1966–67)	Director, Centre for the Study of Christianity and Culture, University of Oxford	
Saul Kripke (born 1940)	College; Society of Fellows	Philosopher	
Thomas Samuel Kuhn (1922–1996)	College 1943; A.M. 1946; PhD 1949	Philosopher and historian of science	
Carole LaBonne (1922–1996)	PhD 1996	Erastus O. Haven Professor of Life Sciences and chair of the department of molecular biosciences at Northwestern University	
Christopher Lasch (1932–1994)	A.B. 1954	Professor of History, University of Rochester; Historian	
David Lewis (1941–2001)	PhD 1967	Professor of Government, Oberlin College; philosopher	
Robert Lieber (born 1941)	PhD 1968	Professor, Department of Government and School of Foreign Service, Georgetown University	
Robert C. Lieberman (born 1964)	PhD 1994	Political scientist, Provost of Johns Hopkins University	
Perry Link (born 1944)	A.B. 1966; PhD 1976	Chancellorial Chair Professor for Innovative Teaching Comparative Literature and Foreign Languages, University of California, Riverside; sinologist	
Frederick D. Losey (1866–1932)	MA 1899	Shakespearian scholar and elocutionist	
Victor H. Mair (born 1943)	PhD 1976	Professor in Chinese Language and Literature, University of Pennsylvania	
Roger Martin (born 1956)	A.B. 1979; M.B.A. 1981	Dean of University of Toronto's Rotman School of Management	
Standish Meacham (1932–2024)	PhD. 1961	Sheffield Centennial Professor of History, University of Texas at Austin	
Robert Mundheim (born 1933)	A.B. 1954; LL.B. 1957	Attorney; dean of law school and professor of law, University of Pennsylvania	
Onora O'Neill, Baroness O'Neill of Bengarve (born 1941)	PhD 1969; LL.D. 2010	Professor of Philosophy, University of Cambridge; president, British Academy (2005–2009); principal, Newnham College, Cambridge; 2017 laureate, Berggruen Prize	
Hugh R. Page (born 1956)	PhD 1990	Professor of Africana Studies and Theology, University of Notre Dame	
Yangjin Pak	A.M. 1992; PhD 1996	Professor of Archeology, Chungnam National University	
James Palais (1934–2006)	A.B. 1955; PhD 1968	Professor of Korean History, University of Washington	
Juan Antonio Pérez López (1934–1996)	PhD 1970	Professor of Organizational Behavior, IESE Business School	
Joel M. Podolny (born 1965)	A.B. with magna cum laude 1986; A.M.; PhD	Dean of the School of Management, Yale University; sociologist	
Eve Troutt Powell (born 1961)	A.B. 1983; A.M. 1988; PhD 1995	Christopher H. Browne Distinguished Professor of History, University of Pennsylvania	
Ben H. Procter (1927–2012)	PhD 1961	Professor of History, Texas Christian University, 1957 to 2000; biographer of William Randolph Hearst	
Daniel Richman	A.B. 1980	Paul J. Kellner Professor of Law, Columbia University	
William Rees Brebner Robertson (1881–1941)	PhD 1915	Professor of Zoology, University of Kansas; Robertsonian translocation	
V. Vance Roley	Masters; PhD	Dean of the Shidler College of Business, University of Hawaiʻi	
Duane W. Roller (born 1946)	PhD 1971	Professor of Classics, Ohio State University	
Mark Rosenzweig (1922–2009)	PhD 1949	Professor, University of California, Berkeley; his studies showed that the brain develops into adulthood based on life experiences	
Jeffrey Sachs (born 1954)	A.B.; A.M; PhD	University Professor, Columbia University; economist	
Edward Said (1935–2003)	A.M.; PhD 1964	Professor of Literature, Columbia University; coined term Orientalism; Palestinian activist	
Naomi Scheman	Masters 1971; PhD 1978	Professor of Philosophy and Gender, Women's and Sexuality Studies at the University of Minnesota	
Andrea Smith	A.B.	Professor in Native American Studies, University of California, Riverside	
Christian Smith (born 1960)	PhD 1990	William R. Kenan Jr. Professor of Sociology, University of Notre Dame	
Timothy L. Smith (1924–1997)	PhD	Professor in American religious history, Johns Hopkins University; religious historian, author	
Diane Souvaine (born 1954)	College	Chairperson of the computer science program at Tufts University; professor of computer science and mathematics	
Ronald Spores (born 1931)	PhD 1964	Professor of Anthropology, Vanderbilt University	
Amy Stanley (born 1977)	A.B. 1999; PhD 2007	Wayne V. Jones II Research Professor in History, Northwestern University	
Marian Stoltz-Loike	Psychology and Social Relations	College Dean and Vice President	
Peter C. Sutton	A.B. 1972	Art historian and director of the Bruce Museum of Arts and Science	
Phillip Swagel (born 1966)	PhD 1993	Economist	
Barbara Tuchman (1912–1989)	Radcliffe 1933; faculty	Historian	
Arthur Waldron (born 1948)	A.B. with summa cum laude 1971; PhD 1981	Lauder Professor of International Relations, University of Pennsylvania	
Jon Wiener (born 1944)	PhD	Historian	
Carter G. Woodson (1875–1950)	PhD 1912	Historian, second African American to receive a Ph.D. (after W.E.B. DuBois), professor and dean of the college of arts and sciences at Howard University, co-founder of Black History Month	
Charles W. Woodworth (1865–1940)	Grad. student, researcher (1886–1888) (1900–1901)	Entomologist; founder of UCB's Entomology Department	
Roy Bin Wong (born 1949)	A.M. 1973, PhD 1983	Distinguished Professor of History, University of California, Los Angeles	
Amy Zegart (born 1967)	College 1989, magna cum laude in East Asian Studies	Professor of Public Policy; UCLA School of Public Affairs	
Laurie Schwab Zabin (1926–2020)	MA	Public health researcher and professor	
Noel Ignatiev (1940–2019)	PhD 1995	Historian	

== Faculty ==
Name	Class year	Notability	Reference(s)
William James (1842–1910)	M.D. 1869; professor	Philosopher and psychologist, founder of psychology department, writer	
Mark Albion (born 1951)	PhD 1982	Author, social entrepreneur, co-founder of Net Impact	
Kenneth Arrow (1921–2017)	Professor	Economist; Nobel Prize winner	
William Berenberg (1915–2005)	College 1936; professor	Professor of pediatrics, physician	
Theodore C. Bestor (1951–2021)	Professor	Anthropologist	
Grete L. Bibring (1899–1977)	Professor, Harvard Medical School	Psychoanalyst; first female professor at Harvard Medical School	
Roderick Bronson	Director, Rodent Pathology Core, Harvard Medical School	Pathologist	
Fitzroy Carrington (1869–1954)	Lecturer on engraving	Journalist	
Marcia Caldas de Castro (1964–)	Demography	Faculty	
Gennaro Chierchia (born 1953)	Haas Foundation Professor of Linguistics	Linguist	
Richard Clarke (born 1951)	Faculty	Diplomat, counterterrorism expert	
Kim B. Clark (born 1949)	College 1974; A.M. 1977; PhD 1978; dean of business school 1995–2005	Economist; president of BYU-Idaho	
Elias J. Corey (born 1928)	Professor	Chemist; Nobel Prize winner	
Bronson Crothers (1884–1959)	College 1904; M.D. 1909; professor (1944–1952)	Pediatric neurologist	
Rose Laub Coser (1916–1994)		Professor of sociology in psychiatry department	
Alan Dershowitz (born 1938)	Professor (born 1964)	Law scholar, pro-Israel activist	
Noam Elkies (born 1966)	A.M. 1986; PhD 1987; professor (born 1990)	Mathematician	
Ephraim Emerton (1851–1935)	Professor	First recipient of the Winn Professorship of Ecclesiastical History	
Archie Epps (1937–2003)	B.D 1961	Dean of Students (1971–1999)	
Denise Faustman (born 1958)	Associate Professor of Medicine	Medical doctor and pioneer in diabetes research	
Martin Feldstein (1939–2019)	College 1961; professor	Economist	
Niall Ferguson (born 1964)	Professor 2005–present	Historian	
C. Stephen Foster	Professor 1993–present	Ophthalmologist	
Jeffry Frieden	Stanfield Professor of International Peace	Chair of the Department of Government	
John Kenneth Galbraith (1908–2006)	Professor	Canadian-American Keynesian economist	
Henry Louis Gates Jr. (born 1950)	Professor	African American studies scholar	
Daniel Gilbert (born 1957)	Professor at the Department of Psychology	Social psychologist	
Andrew M. Gleason (1921–2008)	Hollis Professor of Mathematics and Natural Philosophy	Major contributions to the solution of Hilbert's 5th Problem, the analyticity of Lie groups	
Daniel Goldhagen (born 1959)	PhD; previously an Associate Professor of Government and Social Studies	Political scientist; controversial author of Hitler's Willing Executioners	
Stephen Jay Gould (1941–2002)	Professor	Biologist	
Asa Gray (1810–1888)	Professor	Botanist	
Stephen Greenblatt (born 1943)	Professor	Literary critic	
Walter Gropius (1883–1969)	Professor; dean of Harvard Graduate School of Design	Architect	
Dudley Herschbach (born 1932)	Professor	Chemist; Nobel Prize winner	
Caroline Hoxby (born 1966)	College 1988; professor	Economist	
Helen Lefkowitz Horowitz (born 1942)	PhD; professor	Historian	
Samuel P. Huntington (1927–2008)	PhD 1951; professor	Political scientist	
Jay Jasanoff (born 1942)	A.B. 1963, PhD 1968; professor 1970–78, 1998–	Linguist	
Geoffrey Jones	Professor 2002–present	Business historian	
Diana Kleiner (born 1947)	Assistant professor of Art History (1976–1980)	Art historian	
Howard Koh (born 1952)	Professor, Harvard School of Public Health	Physician	
Ge Kunhua (1838–1882)	Professor	First instructor in Mandarin Chinese at Harvard	
Theodore C. Bestor (1951–2021)	Professor	Anthropologist	
Susumu Kuno (born 1933)	PhD 1964, Professor Emeritus	Linguist	
George Martin Lane (1823–1897)	Professor (1869–1894)	Classical scholar	
Timothy Leary (1920–1996)	Lecturer (1959–1963)	Writer, psychologist, LSD guru	
Alain Leroy Locke (1885–1954)	College 1907; PhD 1918	Writer, educator, philosopher	
William Lipscomb (1919–2011)	Professor	Chemist; Nobel Prize winner	
Henry Wadsworth Longfellow (1807–1882)	Professor (1834–1854)	Poet	
N. Gregory Mankiw (born 1958)	Professor	Economist, Chairman of the Council of Economic Advisors	
Harvey Mansfield (born 1932)	Professor	William R. Kenan Jr. Professor of Government at Harvard University	
Julián Marías (1914–2005)	Professor	Philosopher and author	
Richard Marius (1933–1999)	Professor	Reformation historian and author	
Ernst Mayr (1904–2005)	Professor	Evolutionary biologist	
Robert C. Merton (born 1944)	Professor	Economist, Nobel Prize winner	
Ken Nakayama	Professor	Psychologist	
Robert Nozick (1938–2002)	Professor	Libertarian philosopher	
Francis Parkman (1823–1898)	A.B. 1844; Law	Historian; professor	
Milman Parry (1902–1935)	Professor	Scholar of the classics and folklore	
Benjamin Peirce (1809–1880)	College 1829; professor	Mathematician	
Jordan Peterson (born 1962)	Professor (1993–1998)	Psychologist	
Steven Pinker (born 1954)	PhD 1979; professor	Psychologist	
Robert Putnam (born 1941)	Professor	Political scientist	
W. V. Quine (1908–2000)	PhD 1932; professor (1956–2000)	Philosopher, logician	
Norman F. Ramsey (1915–2011)	Professor	Physicist; Nobel Prize winner	
John Rawls (1921–2002)	Professor	Philosopher, political scientist	
Wade Regehr	Professor	Neurobiology	
Edwin O. Reischauer (1910–1990)	PhD 1939; professor; namesake of Reischauer Institute	East Asian scholar	
Juan Rosai (born 1940)	Visiting Professor	Medical doctor and professor of pathology; author of a main textbook in the field; discoverer of the Rosai-Dorfman disease	
Josiah Royce (1855–1916)	Professor (1892–1914)	Philosopher	
James R. Russell (born 1953)	Professor (born 1993)	Professor and scholar; Mashtots Professor of Armenian Studies, Harvard University	
Matthew Sacchet	Assistant Professor	Neuroscientist	
Nadav Safran (1925–2003)	Professor	Expert in Arab politics; former director of the Center for Middle Eastern Studies	
Michael Sandel (born 1953)	Professor	Political scientist	
George Santayana (1863–1952)	College 1886; PhD 1889	Professor of Philosophy; philosopher	
Elaine Scarry (born 1946)	Professor of English and American Literature and Language, the Walter M. Cabot Professor of Aesthetics and the General Theory of Value	Author	
Thomas Schelling (1921–2016)	Professor	Economist, Nobel Prize 2005	
Arthur M. Schlesinger (1888–1965)	Professor, namesake of Schlesinger Library	Historian	
Julian Schwinger (1918–1994)	Professor	Physicist; Nobel Prize winner (1965)	
Amartya Sen (born 1933)	Professor	Economist; Nobel Prize winner (1998)	
William M. Sinton (1925–2004)	Astronomer	Adolph Lomb Medalist; OSA Fellow	
B. F. Skinner (1904–1990)	PhD 1931, Edgar Pierce Professor of Psychology	Behavioral psychologist, inventor	
Wilfred Cantwell Smith (1916–2000)	Professor	Religious scholar, professor	
Jared Sparks (1789–1866)	College 1819; professor (1838–1849)	Historian	
David A. Thomas (born 1956)	Professor	Dean of the McDonough School of Business at Georgetown University	
Laurence Tribe (born 1941)	College 1962; Law 1966; professor	Lawyer	
Mario Vargas Llosa (born 1936)	Visiting Professor	Writer; Nobel Prize winner	
Edward Willett Wagner (1924–2001)	A.B. 1949; A.M. 1951; PhD 1959	Professor of Korean Studies	
James D. Watson (born 1928)	Professor	Molecular biologist; Nobel Prize winner	
Cornel West (born 1953)	Professor (1993–2002)	African American studies scholar	
George M. Whitesides (born 1939)	College 1960; University professor (born 1982)	Chemist	
James Q. Wilson (1931–2012)	Professor 1961–87	Professor of public policy	
Harry Austryn Wolfson (1887–1974)	PhD; professor	Philosopher	
Richard Wilson (1926–2018)	Professor at the Department of Physics (born 1955)	Physicist	
Robert Burns Woodward (1917–1979)	Professor	Chemist, Nobel Prize 1965	

== See also ==
- List of people from Massachusetts
