= Wendy Amsellem =

American Orthodox rabba and educator

- Education: Harvard University

Wendy Amsellem is an American Orthodox Jewish educator and one of the women ordained by Yeshivat Maharat, the first yeshiva in North America to ordain women as orthodox religious leaders. She teaches Talmud and Halakha at Yeshivat Maharat and directs its Beit Midrash Program, a joint program with Yeshivat Chovevei Torah. She uses the rabbinic title Rabba.

== Education ==
Amsellem holds a Bachelor of Arts in History and Literature from Harvard University. She is an alumna of the Drisha Scholars Circle at the Drisha Institute, and was both a Wexner Graduate Fellow and a Mandel Jerusalem Fellow. She received semikha from Yeshivat Maharat in 2018.

== Career ==
Amsellem teaches Talmud and Halakha at Yeshivat Maharat and directs the Beit Midrash Program. She has served as editor of Maharat's Keren Journal. She has been associated with the Drisha Institute for many years, where she served as Director of the Dr. Beth Samuels Drisha High School Program and as Rosh Kollel of the Drisha July Kollel. She has also taught at the Pardes Institute of Jewish Studies and at the Temple Emanu-El Streicker Center in New York. In 2016 she was named one of the inaugural founding editors of The Lehrhaus, an online forum for Jewish thought and discourse, a role she held until 2018.
