= Kevin Sun =

Kevin Sun (born 1991 or 1992) is a jazz saxophonist and composer. A 2026 review in DownBeat called him "one of the most talented saxophonists and composers on the jazz scene today."

Sun graduated from Harvard University and in 2015 from the New England Conservatory of Music, where he received a master's degree.

He has recorded numerous albums as a composer and bandleader and also been a sideman for other players including Dabin Ryu.

Sun founded and runs the independent label Endectomorph Music.

He lives in Brooklyn.

== Recordings ==
His albums include:

- Great on Paper (2015), with Isaac Wilson, Simon Willson, Robin Baytas
- Earprint (2016), with Tree Palmedo, Simon Willson, Dor Herskovits
- Trio (2017), with Walter Stinson, Matt Honor
- Earprint: Easy Listening (2018), with Tree Palmedo, Simon Willson, Dor Herskovits
- Mute (Fresh Sound New Talent, 2019), mit Christian Li, Jeonglim Yang, Dayeon Seok
- The Sustain of Memory (2019), with Adam O’Farrill, Dana Saul, Simon Willson, Dayeon Seok
- <3 Bird (2021), with Adam O’Farrill, Christian Li, Max Light, Walter Stinson, Matt Honor
- The Depths of Memory (2023), with Adam O’Farrill, Dana Saul, Simon Willson, Dayeon Seok
- The Fate of the Tenor (2024), with Walter Stinson, Matt Honor
- Kevin Sun I. (2026)
- Kevin Sun II. (2026)
