= Charles Lowrey =

American businessperson

- Education: Princeton, Harvard, Yale
- Occupation: Executive Chairman of the Board
- Employer: Prudential Financial
- Board member of: Bank of New York Mellon Corporation (Independent Director)
- Website: LinkedIn

Charles Lowrey is an American business executive and former CEO of Prudential Financial where he also served as the executive chairman. He is a member of LeapFrog Investments leadership council and a board member for Bank of New York Mellon Corporation.

== Biography ==
Lowrey attended Princeton where he majored in architecture, earning a bachelor's degree. He went on to earn an MBA from Harvard as well as a master's degree in architecture from Yale. While at Yale in 1982, he received the H.I. Feldman Prize for best solution to an architectural problem.

Lowrey began his professional life as an architect, founding and managing an architecture firm in New York City. Within a few years, he transitioned to a career in business, beginning with J.P. Morgan, where he worked in real estate investment banking. He joined Prudential Financial in 2001 and in 2002 was promoted to the CEO of its real estate investors business. He also spent time as CEO of the company's investment management group (now known as PGIM), a position he took over in 2008. Beginning in 2011, he was the chief operating officer and executive vice president of Prudential's international businesses. He previously spent three years in the same positions for Prudential's U.S. businesses.

In 2018, Lowrey became CEO of the company, replacing John Strangfeld. He was appointment chairman in 2019. In 2020, he was appointed to New Jersey's Restart and Recovery Commission by Governor Phil Murphy. The following year he became the co-chair of the New Jersey CEO Council. In December 2021, Lowrey "pledged to find $750 million in cost savings by the end of 2023" after overseeing the sale of the company's retirement business. In 2021 he was the highest compensated CEO of a publicly traded United States life insurance company.

He was awarded the inaugural William G. McGowan Ethical Leader of the Year Award in 2022. He served as a member of the board of directors of the New Jersey Performing Arts Center, and became the co-chair in 2023.

Lowrey stepped down as CEO of Prudential in March 2025, remaining on the board as executive chairman until March 2026. In September 2025, Lowrey joined the leadership council for LeapFrog Investments. He was also elected to the Board of Directors of The Bank of New York Mellon Corporation in December 2025.
