= Hilary Blumberg =

American medical doctor and psychiatrist

- Born: Hilary Patricia Blumberg
- Occupation: Psychiatrist
- Known for: Inaugural John and Hope Furth Professor, bipolar disorder research
- Title: John and Hope Furth Professor of Psychiatry; Professor of child study; Director of Yale Mood Disorders Research
- Awards: Independent Investigator Award - NARSAD (2006)

Academic background
- Education: Harvard University; Cornell University Medical College (1990); New York Hospital residency; Weill Medical College neuroimaging fellowship
- Alma mater: Cornell University Medical College

Academic work
- Discipline: Psychiatry
- Main interests: Bipolar disorders,

Hilary Patricia Blumberg is a medical doctor and the inaugural John and Hope Furth Professor of Psychiatry at the Yale School of Medicine. She is also a professor of Radiology and Biomedical Imaging, and works in the Child Study Center at Yale where she has been a faculty member since 1998. She attended Harvard University as an undergraduate, and completed medical school at Cornell University Medical College (1990). She completed her medical internship and psychiatry residency at Cornell University Medical College/New York Hospital, and her neuroimaging fellowship training at Cornell University, Weill Medical College. She has received the 2006 National Alliance for Research in Schizophrenia and Depression (NARSAD) and the Gerald L. Klerman Award for Clinical Research. Blumberg has authored a number of scientific articles that focus on bipolar disorder, neuroimaging, and effects of specific genetic variations, developmental trajectories and structure-function relationships.

== Career and research ==
=== Awards and honours ===
- Mogens Schou Award Winner by International Society for Bipolar Disorders in 2021
- Blanche F. Ittleson Award by American Psychiatric Association in 2018
- Colvin Prize for Outstanding Achievement in Mood Disorders Research by Brain and Behavior foundation in 2017

=== Publications ===
- A. Sankar et al., “Telehealth Social Rhythm Therapy to Reduce Mood Symptoms and Suicide Risk Among Adolescents and Young Adults With Bipolar Disorder,” American Journal of Psychotherapy, Jul. 2021
- H. P. Blumberg et al., “Rostral and Orbital Prefrontal Cortex Dysfunction in the Manic State of Bipolar Disorder,” American Journal of Psychiatry, null156, no. 12, null1988, Dec. 1999.
- M. N. Potenza et al., “An fMRI Stroop Task Study of Ventromedial Prefrontal Cortical Function in Pathological Gamblers,” American Journal of Psychiatry, vol. 160, no. 11, pp. 1990–1994, Nov. 2003.
- H. P. Blumberg et al., “Frontostriatal Abnormalities in Adolescents With Bipolar Disorder: Preliminary Observations From Functional MRI,” American Journal of Psychiatry, vol. 160, no. 7, pp. 1345–1347, Jul. 2003.
- J. A. Y. Johnston et al., “Multimodal Neuroimaging of Frontolimbic Structure and Function Associated With Suicide Attempts in Adolescents and Young Adults With Bipolar Disorder,” American Journal of Psychiatry, vol. 174, no. 7, pp. 667–675, Jul. 2017.
