= Kristen Green =

American journalist

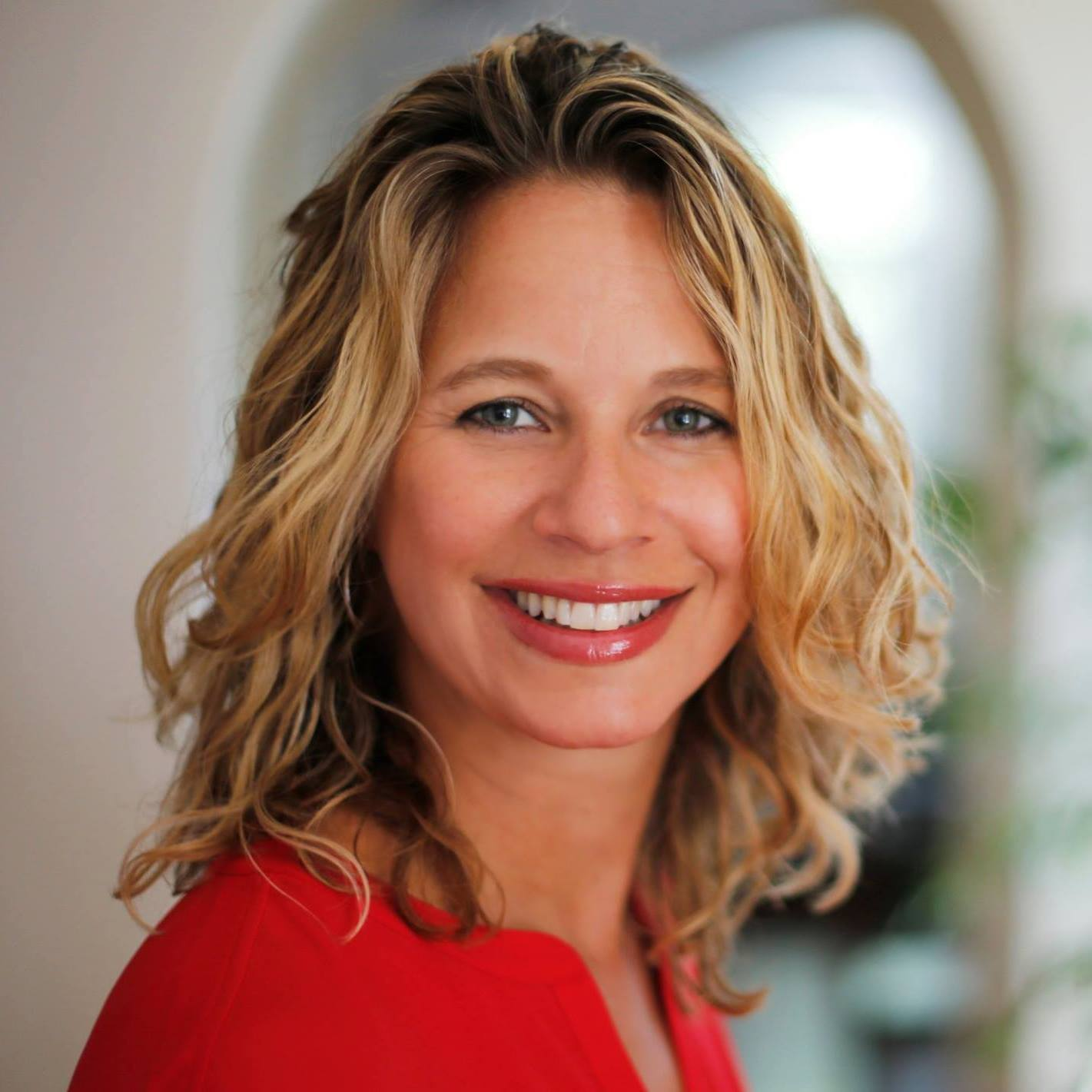
- Green in 2015
- Education: Harvard Kennedy School of Government
- Occupation: journalist

Kristen Green is an American author and journalist.

== Early life ==
Green grew up in Farmville, Virginia. She graduated from the University of Mary Washington (undergrad) and Harvard Kennedy School of Government with a Master of Public Administration.

== Career ==
She worked as a reporter for The Boston Globe, the Richmond Times-Dispatch, and The San Diego Union-Tribune. Her work has also appeared in The Atlantic and NPR.

Her 2015 book, Something Must Be Done About Prince Edward County, is about a protest during the school desegregation crisis in Prince Edward County, Virginia, led by student Barbara Johns. The county's response eventually led to the closing of all public schools, white and black. Her book not only describes an historical event, but also shows that the fears and exaggerations that allowed segregation to take place are still very alive in today's United States. The Washington Post named it on its list of "notable nonfiction" for 2015.

== Published works ==
- Something Must Be Done About Prince Edward County (2015)
- The Devil's Half Acre (2022)
