= Roderick Bronson =

American academic

Roderick T. Bronson, D.V.M. is an American pathologist and the director of the Rodent Pathology Core at Harvard Medical School. Dr. Bronson has authored or co-authored more than 400 scientific articles and has been recognized by I.S.I. Thompson as a highly cited author.

As part of the Rodent Pathology Core, he is an expert in rodent pathology. As such, his expertize has been invaluable for the phenotypic characterization of countless knockout mice generated within the Harvard/MIT community. He has a long-running collaboration with Tyler Jacks and Robert Weinberg, starting with the characterization of tumors in p53 knockout mice. Since knockout mice are the litmus test for physiological mechanistic theories and since this requires proper pathological phenotyping, Rod Bronson has made major contributions to a wide swathe of biology, including aging, glioblastoma, neuroscience and others.
