= Yangjin Pak =

Korean archaeologist

Yangjin Pak, or Pak Yangjin, is an archaeologist and Professor in the Department of Archaeology at Chungnam National University in Daejeon, South Korea.

== Education ==
Pak received his BA degree in Archaeology and Art History in 1984 from Seoul National University and his MA and PhD degrees in anthropology in 1992 and 1996, respectively, from Harvard University in the United States. At Harvard, Yangjin Pak was one of the last graduate students of Professor Kwang-chih Chang.

== Career ==
Pak has conducted archaeological research on the northern provinces of China and Korean Peninsula. His research interests include Chinese archaeology, especially Bronze Age cultures in the northern frontiers of China; archaeology of northeast China; prehistoric and early historical archaeology of Korea; social complexity; cultural, ethnic, and gender identities; and relation between archaeology and contemporary societies.

Pak was a post-doctoral fellow at Korea Institute, Harvard University in 1995-1996 and a visiting scholar at Institute of Archaeology, Chinese Academy of Social Sciences, China, in 2004–2005, and at Cotsen Institute of Archaeology, UCLA, in 2008–2009. He has been a full-time faculty member of Department of Archaeology, Chungnam National University since 1997. Pak also served as vice president for International Affairs of Chungnam National University in 2005–2007. He has been President of the Society for East Asian Archaeology since 2012. Pak is currently a visiting scholar at Harvard University.
