= John Enemark =

American chemist

- Education: Harvard University
- Scientific career
- Fields: Chemistry
- Workplaces: University of Arizona

John H. Enemark is an American chemist, focusing in bioinorganic chemistry, molybdenum-containing enzymes, pulsed EPR spectroscopy, X-ray crystallography and metal nitrosyls, currently the Regents Professor Emeritus at University of Arizona.

== Education ==
- 1962 – St. Olaf College, Northfield, Minnesota, B.A. (Chemistry)
- 1964 – Harvard University, A.M., (Chemistry), R. H. Holm, thesis director
- 1966 – Harvard University, Ph.D., (Chemistry), W. N. Lipscomb, Jr., thesis director
