= Bill Branon =

American novelist

- Born: Connecticut
- Occupations: Author, novelist
- Writing career
- Period: 1992–present
- Genre: Military science fiction
- Subject: Thrillers
- Notable work: Let Us Prey

Bill Branon, from Hartford, Connecticut, is a novelist and former Naval medical officer and weapons expert best known for his thriller Let Us Prey.

== Biography ==
After graduating from Harvard, where Branon played on the school's baseball team as a pitcher, he entered the U.S. Navy via Officer Candidate School. He retired at the rank of Captain after 23 years of service. While in the service, Branon worked as a dentist, including in forensic dental work.

== Career ==
In 1992 at age 52, he self-published the book Let Us Prey. It was reviewed and listed on The New York Times "Notable Books of the Year," which caught the notice of mainstream publishing houses. After a bidding war among publishers, it was picked up by HarperCollins and published under the same title, making it into the Book-of-the-Month Club. PEOPLE magazine, after the book was re-released, published a review in 1994. He went on to write "Devils Hole" and "Spider Snatch." A book about a fictional coyote was his fourth book.

In 1994, he moved to Las Vegas from Southern California with his wife Lolly. "There are more stories per square inch in Las Vegas than anywhere else. It has a vibe to it," Branon told the Las Vegas Sun in a February 1999 interview.

Branon was included in a 2002 article in the Las Vegas Review-Journal about celebrities who live in the Las Vegas Valley.
