= Brian M. Salzberg =

American neuroscientist, biophysicist and professor

- Occupations: Neuroscientist, biophysicist, professor

Academic background
- Education: B.S, Yale College; A.M., Harvard University; Ph.D., Harvard University
- Alma mater: Yale College; Harvard University
- Thesis: The Reaction π^{−}p → p π^{+}π^{−}π^{−} at 13 and 20 GeV/c

Academic work
- Discipline: Neuroscience, biophysics
- Institutions: University of Pennsylvania

Brian M. Salzberg is an American neuroscientist, biophysicist and professor. He is professor of Neuroscience and of Physiology at the Perelman School of Medicine, University of Pennsylvania.

Salzberg is a fellow of the American Association for the Advancement of Science, the American Physical Society, and the Optical Society of America. Salzberg was elected to four year terms as Member of the Board of Trustees of the Marine Biological Laboratory, Woods Hole, in 1980, 1987, and 1991.

== Education ==
Salzberg received his B.S. from Yale College in 1963. In 1965, he received his A.M. and in 1972, his Ph.D., both from Harvard University. In 1971, he joined the Yale University, School of Medicine for post doctoral research in Physiology. In 1972, he joined the Marine Biological Laboratory, Wood Hole as an investigator and continued working there in the summers until 1994.

== Career ==
In 1975, Salzberg joined the University of Pennsylvania as faculty and been there since. He is currently professor of Neuroscience and of Physiology at the University of Pennsylvania.

In 1986, Salzberg was elected to the council of the Society of General Physiologists and served there until 1988. He was elected to the council and to the Executive Board of the Biophysical Society in 1987 and served there for three years. He was re-elected to the council of Biophysical Society in 1998 and re-elected to the executive board for two years in 2000.

== Athletics ==
Salzberg is a long distance runner who completed 21 marathons between 1973 and 2007 including 7 Boston Marathons and 4 NYC Marathons. Between 1977 and 1992, he finished 7 marathons in under three hours.

== Awards and honors ==
- 1989 - Elected Fellow, American Association for the Advancement of Science
- 1987 - Elected Fellow, American Physical Society
- 2014 - Elected Fellow, Optical Society of America

== Selected publications ==
=== Books ===
- Optical Methods in Cell Physiology. Society of General Physiologists Series. New York: Rockefeller University Press. 1986.

=== Selected articles ===
- Davila, H. V.; Salzberg, B. M.; Cohen, L. B.; Waggoner, A. S. (1973). "A Large Change in Axon Fluorescence That Provides a Promising Method for Measuring Membrane Potential". Nature New Biology. 241 (109): 159–160. doi:10.1038/newbio241159a0. PMID 4512623.
- Salzberg, B. M.; Davila, H. V.; Cohen, L. B. (1973). "Optical Recording of Impulses in Individual Neurones of an Invertebrate Central Nervous System". Nature. 246 (5434): 508–509. Bibcode:1973Natur.246..508S. doi:10.1038/246508a0. PMID 4357630.
- Cohen, L. B.; Salzberg, B. M. (1978). "Optical Measurement of Membrane Potential". Reviews of Physiology Biochemistry and Pharmacology. Reviews of Physiology, Biochemistry and Pharmacology. 83: 35–88. doi:10.1007/3-540-08907-1_2. ISBN 978-3-540-09488-3. PMID 360357.
- Salzberg, B. M.; Obaid, A. L.; Senseman, D. M.; Gainer, H. (1983). "Optical Recording of Action Potentials from Vertebrate Nerve Terminals Using Potentiometric Probes Provides Evidence for Sodium and Calcium Components". Nature. 306 (5938): 36–40. Bibcode:1983Natur.306...36S. doi:10.1038/306036a0. PMID 6633657.
- Obaid, A. L.; Koyano, T.; Lindstrom, J.; Sakai, T.; Salzberg, B. M. (1999). "Spatio-temporal Patterns of Activity in an Intact Mammalian Network with Single Cell Resolution: Optical Studies of Nicotinic Activity in an Enteric Plexus". Journal of Neuroscience. 19 (8): 3073–3093. doi:10.1523/JNEUROSCI.19-08-03073.1999. PMC 6782272. PMID 10191324.
- Fisher, J. A. N.; Barchi, J. R.; Welle, C. G.; Kim, G. H.; Kosterin, P.; Obaid, A. L.; Yodh, A.; Contreras, D.; Salzberg, B. M. (2008). "Two-photon Excitation of Potentiometric Probes Enables Optical Recording of Action Potentials from Mammalian Nerve Terminals In Situ". Journal of Neurophysiology. 99 (3): 1545–1553. doi:10.1152/jn.00929.2007. PMID 18171710.
