= Will Graham (producer) =

American television producer

- Education: Columbia University (BA)
- Occupations: Television producer, director, writer
- Known for: Co-creating the Onion News Network
- Parent(s): Donald E. Graham and Mary Graham
- Awards: The Peabody Awards (2008)

Will Graham is an American producer, director, and screenwriter. He is the showrunner of Mozart in the Jungle and was one of the founders of the Onion News Network. He is also the co-creator of the 2022 television series A League of Their Own.

== Biography ==
Graham is a member of the Graham family, known for owning The Washington Post between 1933 and 2013. His parents are Donald E. Graham, who served as president and CEO of the newspaper, and Mary Graham, an expert on the law of government transparency.

Graham attended Columbia University for his Bachelor of Arts and Master of Fine Arts, directing the 107th Varsity Show. Among his castmates were Lang Fisher, who created Never Have I Ever with Mindy Kaling, and DGA Award-winning director Susanna Fogel, executive producer of The Flight Attendant.

The Onion directly hired Graham upon graduating to serve as executive producer of the Onion News Network and showrunner of the spin-off Onion SportsDome for Comedy Central. Graham has long been associated with Amazon Studios, where he produced one of the studio's first pilots, The Onion Presents: The News, the pilot Salem Rogers and wrote for Alpha House. He became an executive producer of the series Mozart in the Jungle at the beginning of its third season. He was also the director of the short film Homeschooled, starring Liev Schreiber and Naomi Watts, and was released as part of the film Movie 43.

In 2017, Graham formed Field Trip Productions and signed a first-look deal with Amazon Studios. In November 2019, he signed a new first-look deal with Amazon Studios as a showrunner of Daisy Jones & the Six and A League of Their Own.

In 2025, Graham was announced as the writer, director and co-producer of Trust the Man, a Vietnam War thriller starring Daniel Radcliffe and Jonathan Groff, with filming taking place in New Jersey.

== Awards ==
He won a Peabody Award in 2009 for directing and executive producing Onion News Network. He was also nominated for a Webby Awards in 2011 as part of The Onion team.

== Filmography ==
Television

Year	Title	Director	Writer	Producer	Notes
2007–2010	The Onion	Yes	No	Executive	
2011	Onion SportsDome	Yes	No	Executive	
2011	Onion News Network	Yes	No	Executive	
2013–2014	Alpha House	No	Yes	Consulting	Wrote 4 episodes
2015–2016	Odd Mom Out	No	Yes	Consulting	Wrote episodes "Omakase" and "Crushed"
2016–2018	Mozart in the Jungle	Yes	Yes	Executive	Directed 2 episodes, wrote 3 episodes
2022	A League of Their Own	Yes	Yes	Executive	Also creator; Directed episode "Stealing Home", wrote 3 episodes
2023	Daisy Jones & the Six	Yes	Yes	Executive	Directed episode "Track 7: She's Gone", wrote episodes "Track 3: Someone Saved My Life Tonight" and "Track 6: Whatever Gets You Thru the Night"

Film

Year	Title	Director	Writer	Producer	Notes
2013	Movie 43	Yes	Yes	No	Segment "Homeschooled"
TBA	Trust the Man	Yes	Yes	Co-producer	
