= 34th Golden Raspberry Awards =

2013 award ceremony presented by the Golden Raspberry Award Foundation

- Date: March 1, 2014
- Site: IgnitedSpaces, Los Angeles, California

Highlights
- Worst Picture: Movie 43
- Most awards: After Earth / Movie 43 (3)
- Most nominations: Grown Ups 2 (9)

The 34th Golden Raspberry Awards, or Razzies, was a parodic award ceremony that identified the worst films the film industry had to offer in 2013, according to votes from members of the Golden Raspberry Foundation. Razzies co-founder John J. B. Wilson has stated that the intent of the awards is "to be funny." Nominations were revealed on January 15, 2014, and the winners were announced on March 1, 2014. The pre-nomination ballot was revealed on December 26, 2013.

This marks the final time a minor has been awarded a Razzie before, in 2023, the Golden Raspberry Foundation immediately regretted the decision nominating Ryan Kiera Armstrong as Worst Actress, following backlash from voters, resulting in them winning their own award.

== Winners and nominees ==
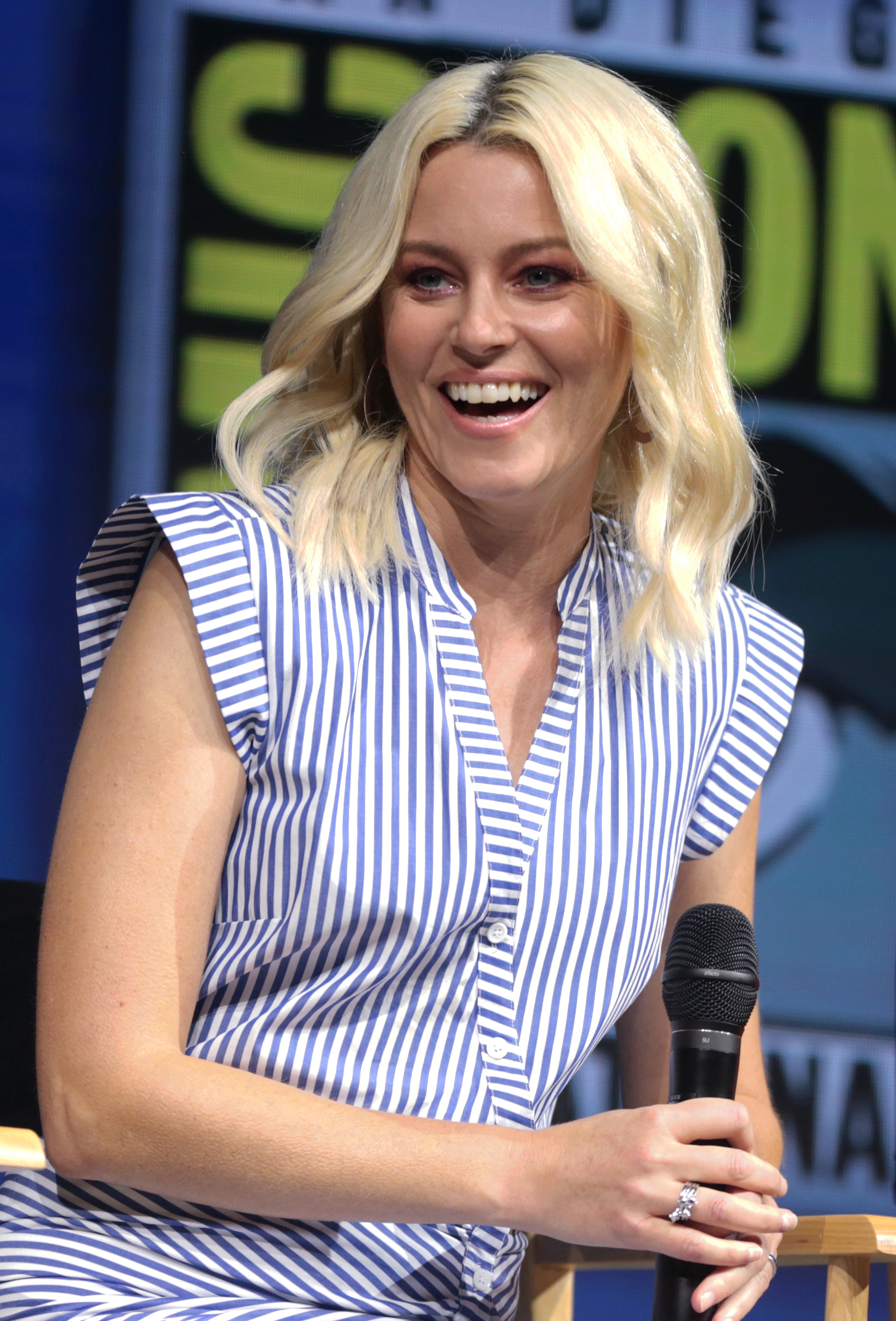
Elizabeth Banks, Worst Director co-winner

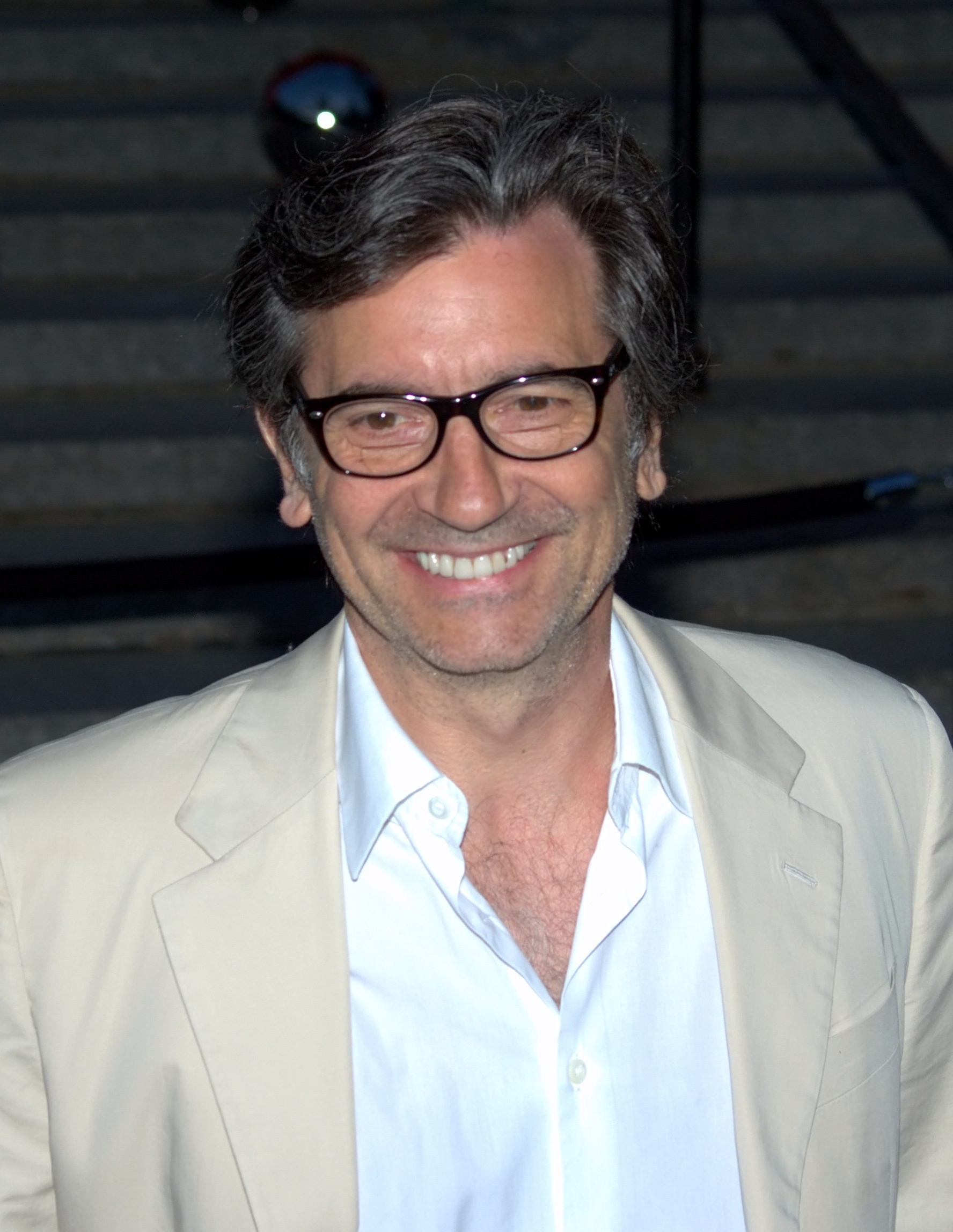
Griffin Dunne, Worst Director co-winner

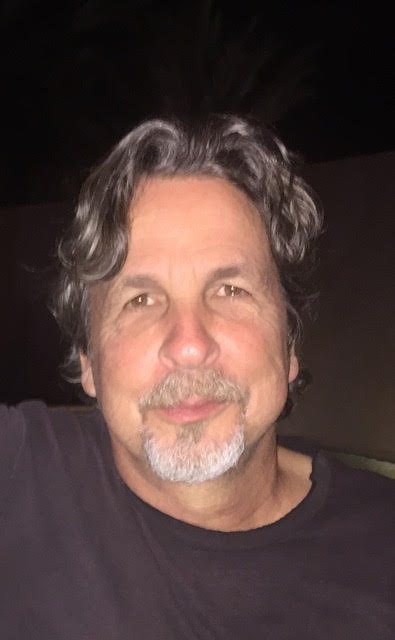
Peter Farrelly, Worst Director co-winner

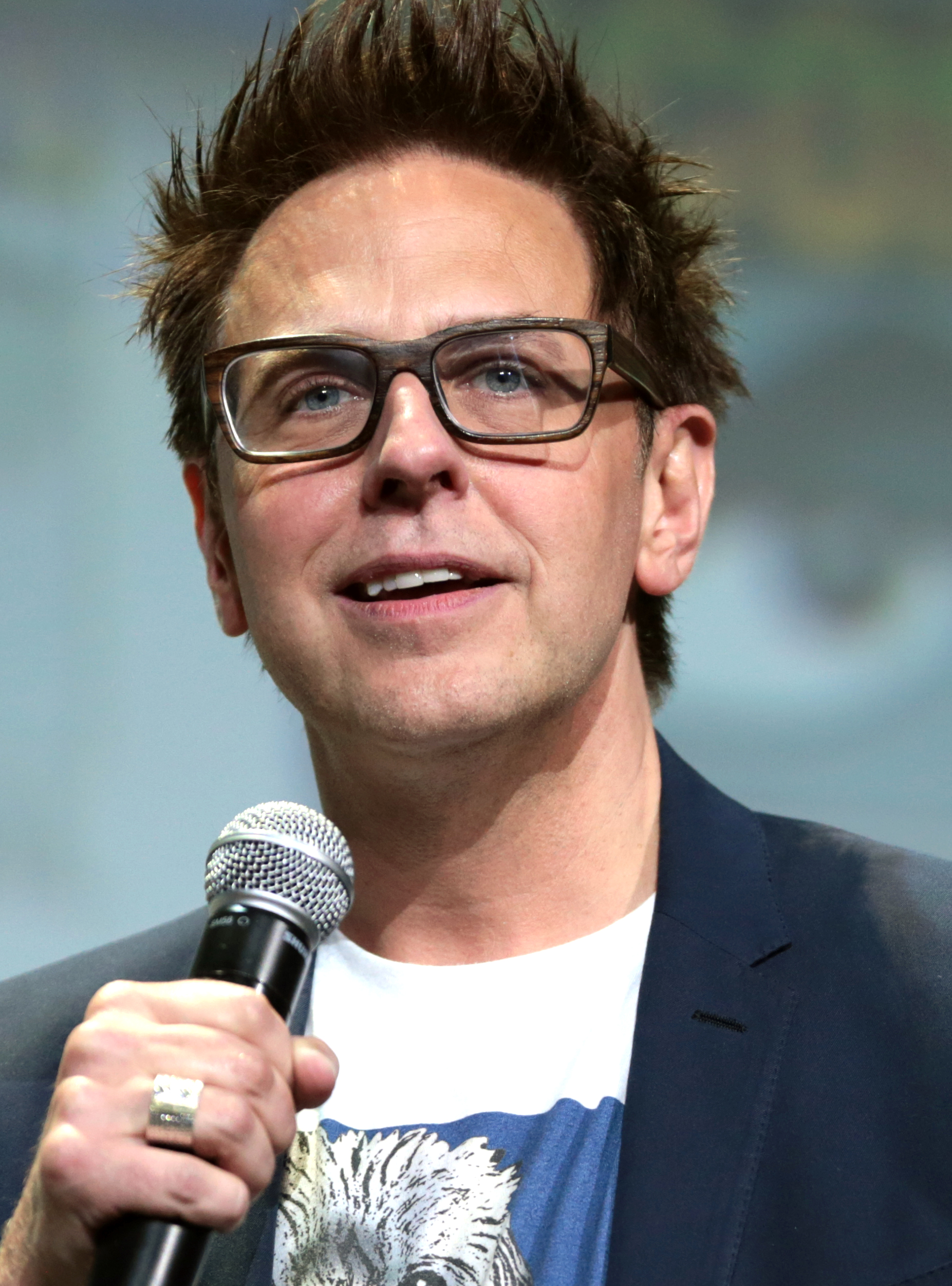
James Gunn, Worst Director and Worst Screenplay co-winner

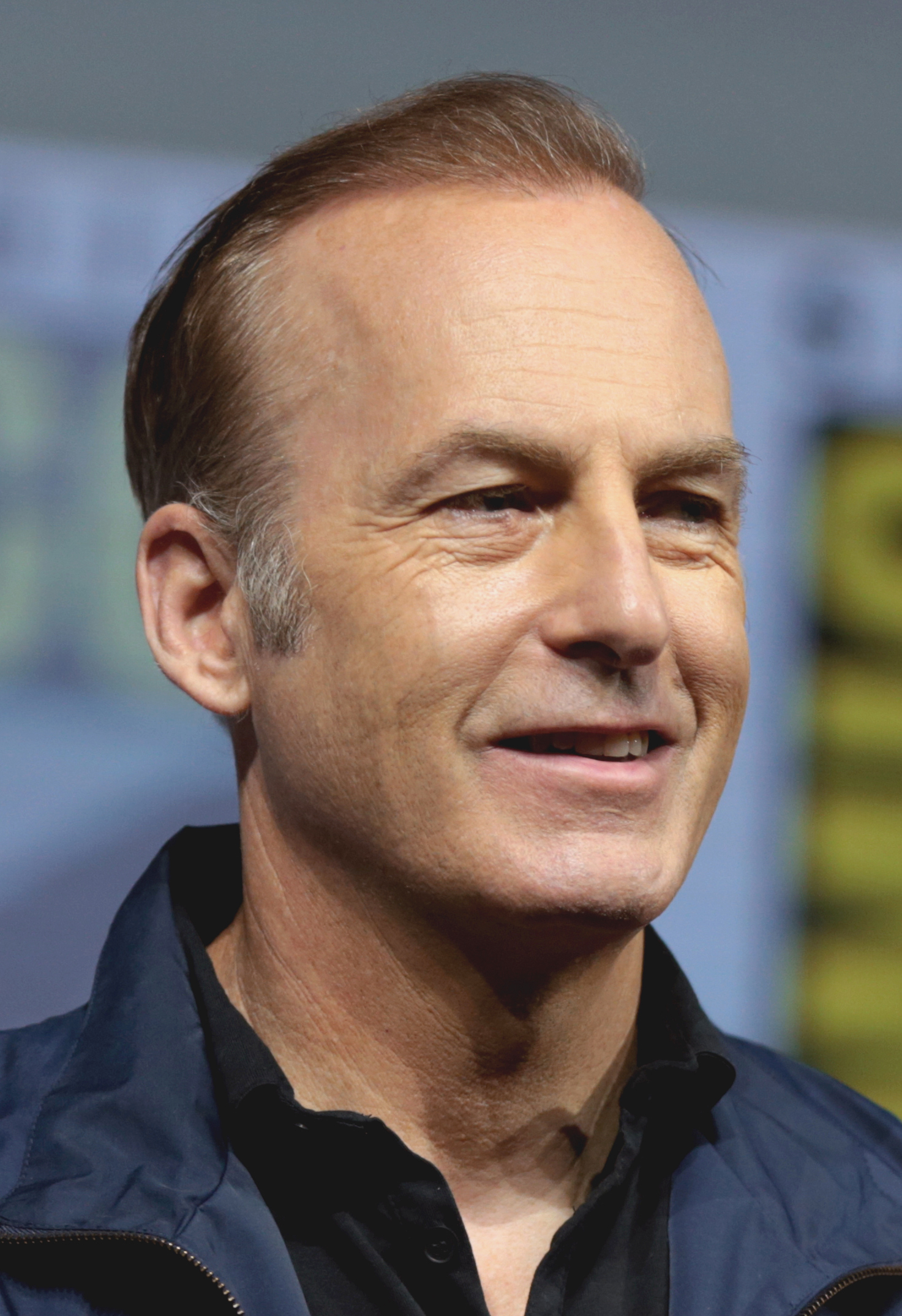
Bob Odenkirk, Worst Director and Worst Screenplay co-winner

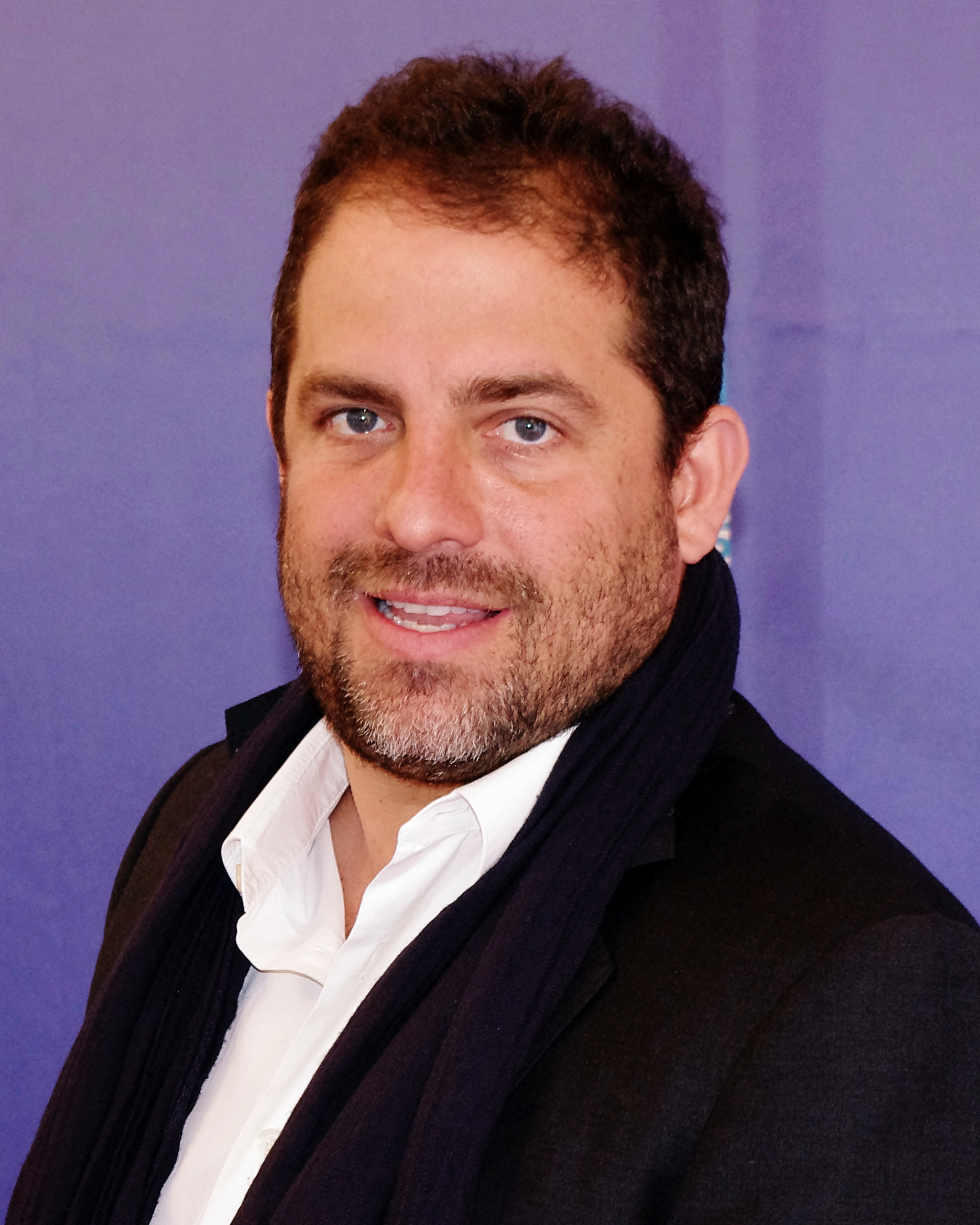
Brett Ratner, Worst Director co-winner

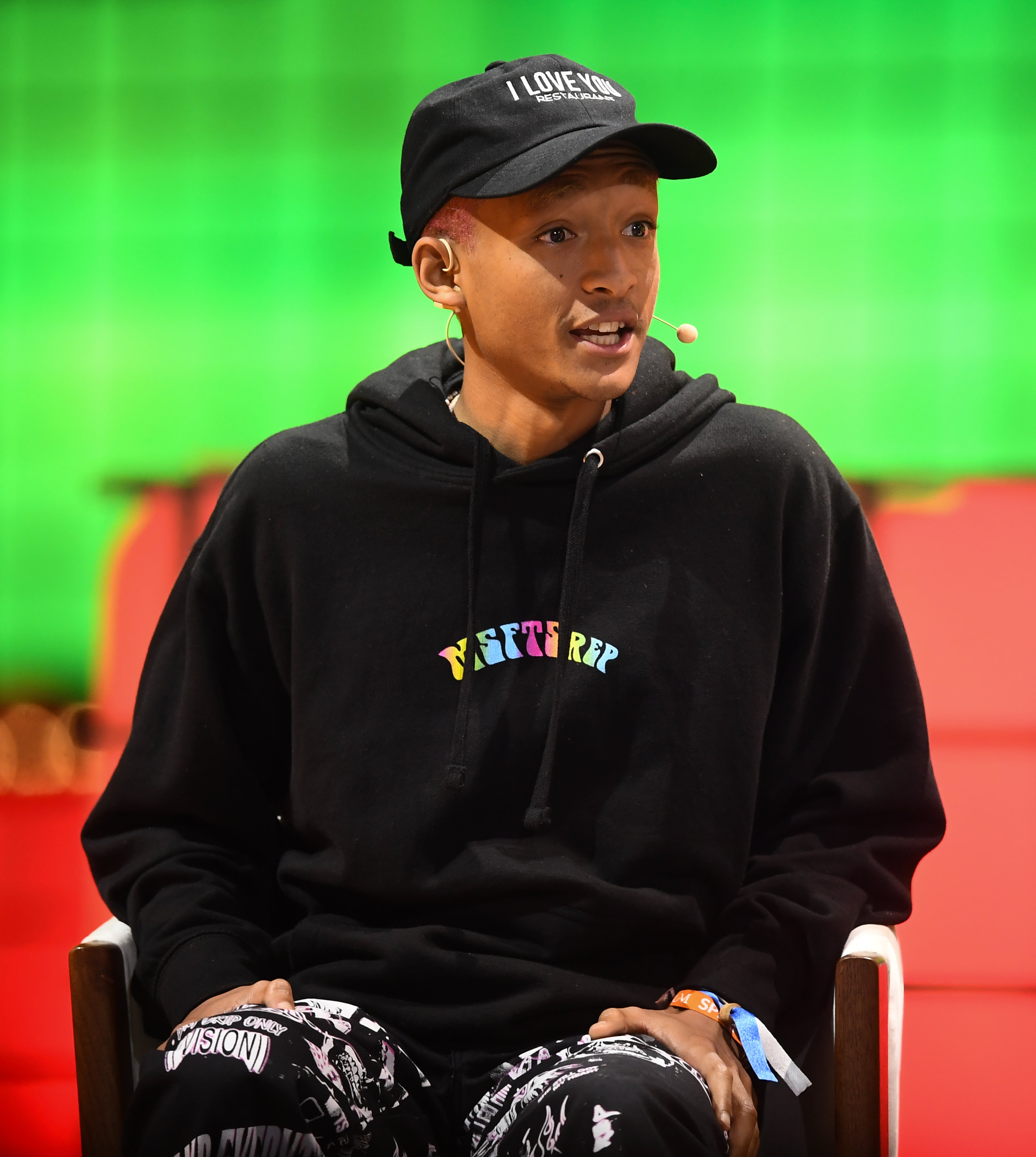
Jaden Smith, Worst Actor winner and Worst Screen Combo co-winner

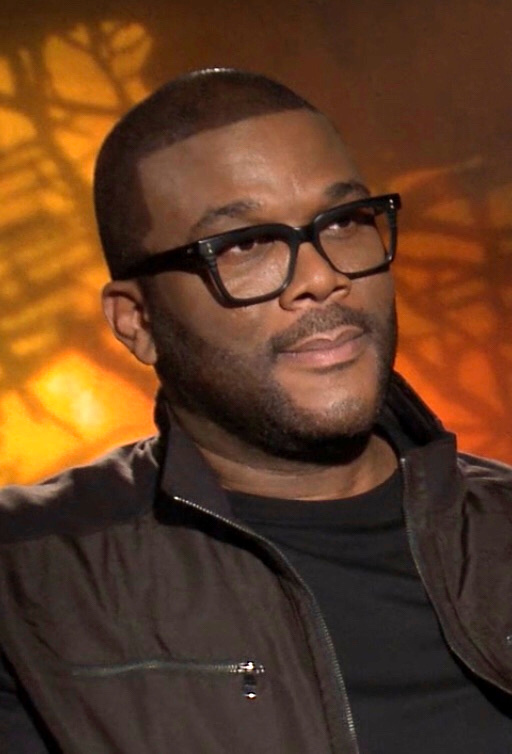
Tyler Perry, Worst Actress winner

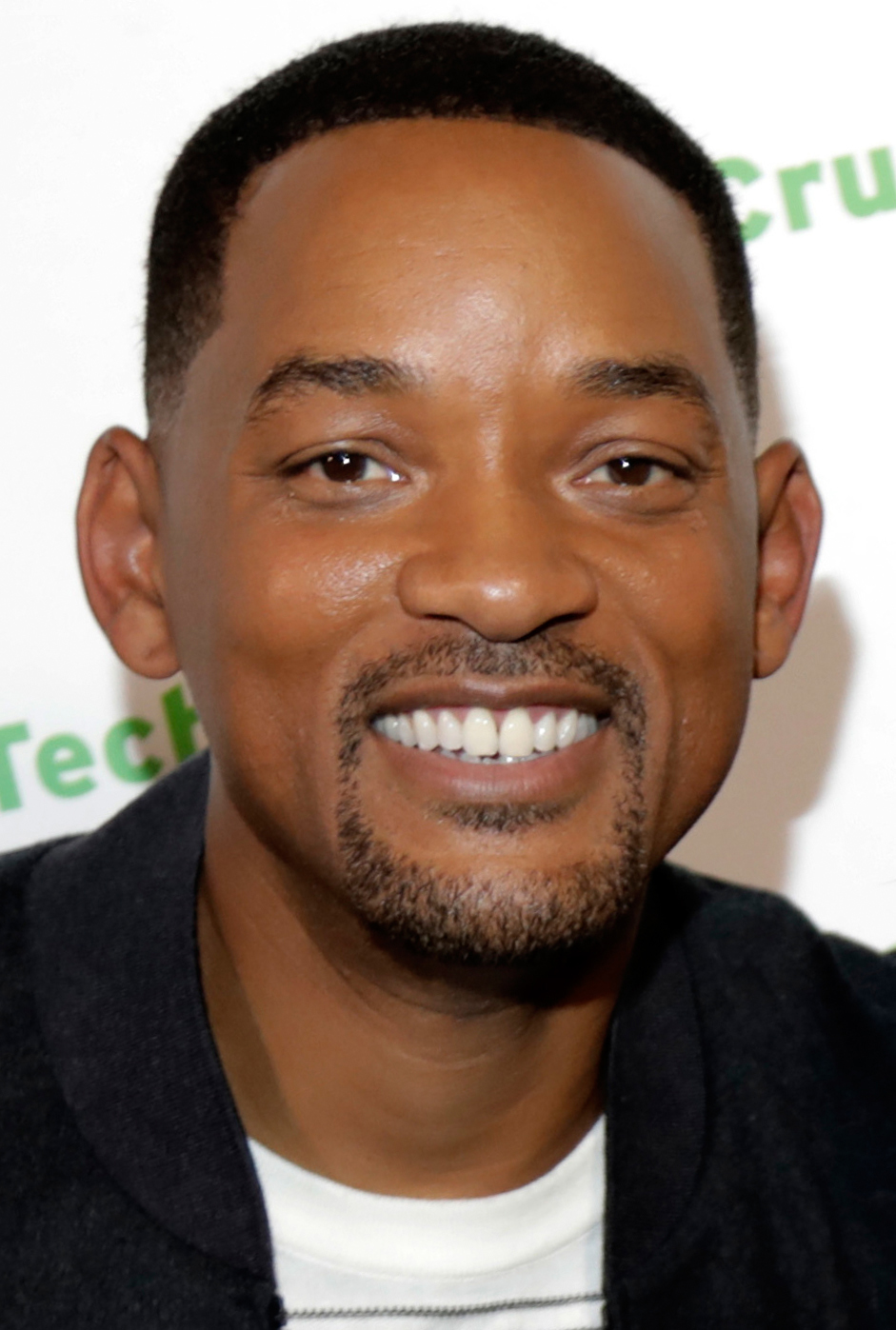
Will Smith, Worst Supporting Actor winner and Worst Screen Combo co-winner

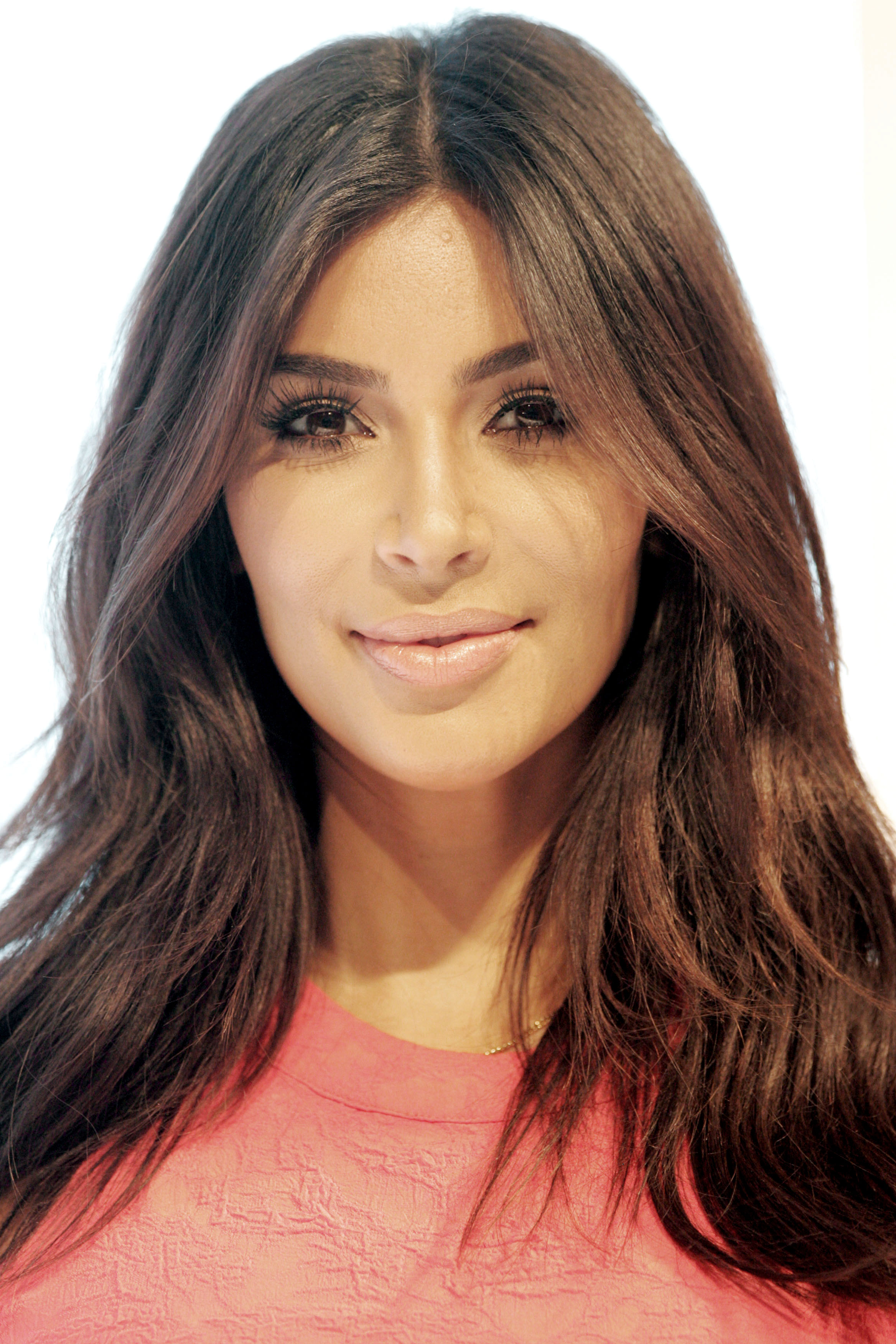
Kim Kardashian, Worst Supporting Actress winner

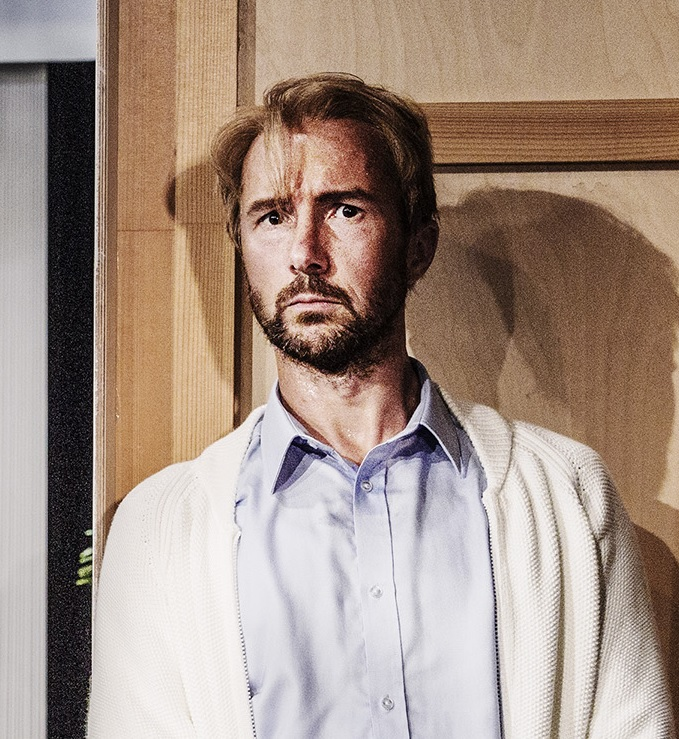
Olle Sarri, Worst Screenplay co-winner

Worst Picture: Movie 43 (Relativity Media); After Earth (Columbia); Grown Ups 2 (Columbia); The Lone Ranger (Disney); A Madea Christmas (Lionsgate)	Worst Director: Elizabeth Banks, Steven Brill, Steve Carr, Rusty Cundieff, James Duffy, Griffin Dunne, Peter Farrelly, Patrik Forsberg, Will Graham, James Gunn, Bob Odenkirk, Brett Ratner, & Jonathan van Tulleken for Movie 43; Dennis Dugan for Grown Ups 2; Tyler Perry for A Madea Christmas and Temptation: Confessions of a Marriage Counselor; M. Night Shyamalan for After Earth; Gore Verbinski for The Lone Ranger
Worst Actor: Jaden Smith in After Earth as Kitai Raige; Johnny Depp in The Lone Ranger as Tonto; Ashton Kutcher in Jobs as Steve Jobs; Adam Sandler in Grown Ups 2 as Lenny Feder; Sylvester Stallone in Bullet to the Head, Escape Plan and Grudge Match as James "Bobo" Bonomo, Ray Breslin, and Henry "Razor" Sharp (respectively)	Worst Actress: Tyler Perry in A Madea Christmas as Madea; Halle Berry in The Call and Movie 43 as Jordan Turner and Emily (respectively); Selena Gomez in Getaway as The Kid; Lindsay Lohan in The Canyons as Tara; Naomi Watts in Diana and Movie 43 as Princess Diana and Samantha Miller (respectively)
Worst Supporting Actor: Will Smith in After Earth as Cypher Raige; Chris Brown in Battle of the Year as Rooster; Larry the Cable Guy in A Madea Christmas as Buddy; Taylor Lautner in Grown Ups 2 as Frat Boy Andy; Nick Swardson in Grown Ups 2 and A Haunted House as Nick Hilliard and Chip the Psychic (respectively)	Worst Supporting Actress: Kim Kardashian in Temptation: Confessions of a Marriage Counselor as Ava; Salma Hayek in Grown Ups 2 as Roxanne Chase-Feder; Katherine Heigl in The Big Wedding as Lyla Griffin; Lady Gaga in Machete Kills as Third Face of El Chameleon; Lindsay Lohan in InAPPropriate Comedy and Scary Movie 5 as herself
Worst Screen Combo: Jaden Smith and Will Smith on planet Nepotism in After Earth; The entire cast of Grown Ups 2; The entire cast of Movie 43; Lindsay Lohan and Charlie Sheen in Scary Movie 5; Tyler Perry and either Larry the Cable Guy or that worn-out wig and dress in A Madea Christmas	Worst Remake, Rip-off or Sequel: The Lone Ranger (Disney); Grown Ups 2 (Columbia); The Hangover Part III (Warner Bros.); Scary Movie 5 (Dimension/The Weinstein Company); The Smurfs 2 (Columbia/Sony Animation)
Worst Screenplay: Movie 43 (written by Steve Baker, Ricky Blitt, Will Carlough, Tobias Carlson, Jacob Fleisher, Patrik Forsberg, Will Graham, James Gunn, Claes Kjellstrom, Jack Kukoda, Bob Odenkirk, Bill O'Malley, Matthew Alec Portenoy, Greg Pritikin, Rocky Russo, Olle Sarri, Elizabeth Wright Shapiro, Jeremy Sosenko, Jonathan van Tulleken, & Jonas Wittenmark); After Earth (screenplay by M. Night Shyamalan and Gary Whitta, story by Will Smith); Grown Ups 2 (screenplay by Adam Sandler, Tim Herlihy, & Fred Wolf); The Lone Ranger (screenplay by Justin Haythe, Ted Elliott and Terry Rossio, story by Elliott, Rossio, & Haythe, based on the character by Fran Striker and George W. Trendle); A Madea Christmas (written by Tyler Perry)

== Films with multiple nominations ==
The following films received multiple nominations:

Nominations	Film
9	Grown Ups 2
6	After Earth
6	A Madea Christmas
6	Movie 43
5	The Lone Ranger
3	Scary Movie 5
2	Temptation: Confessions of a Marriage Counselor
