= Public participation (decision making) =

Concept in social science

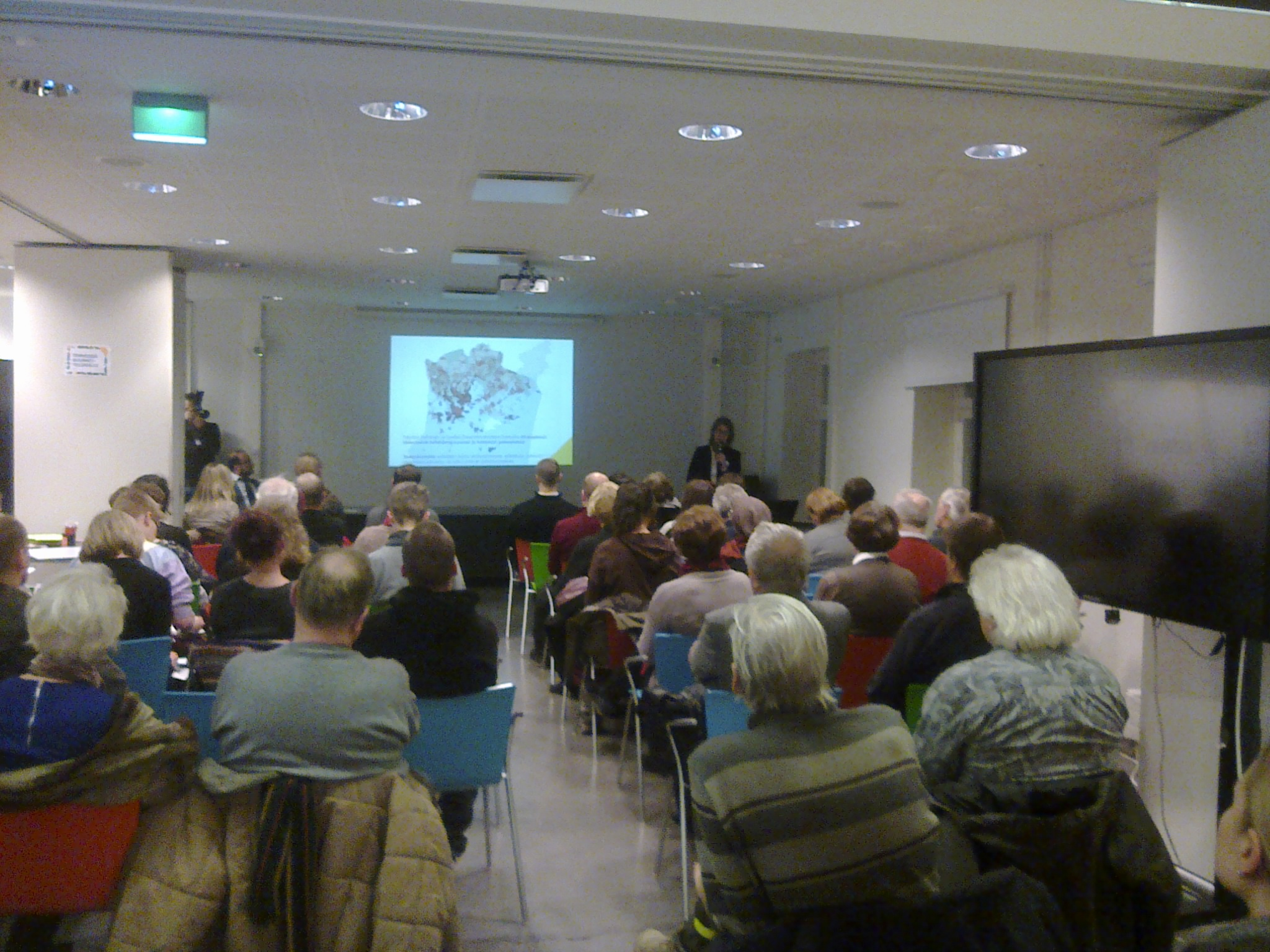
A public consultation event about urban planning in Helsinki

Citizen participation or public participation in social science refers to different mechanisms for the public to express opinions—and ideally exert influence—regarding political, economic, managerial, or other social decisions. Participatory decision-making can take place along any realm of human social activity, including economic (i.e. participatory economics), political (i.e. participatory democracy or parpolity), management (i.e. participatory management), cultural (i.e. polyculturalism) or familial (i.e. feminism).

For well-informed participation to occur, some scholars argue that a degree of transparency, such as radical transparency, is necessary but not sufficient. It has also been argued that those most affected by a decision should have the most say, while those least affected should have the least say.

== Classifying participation ==
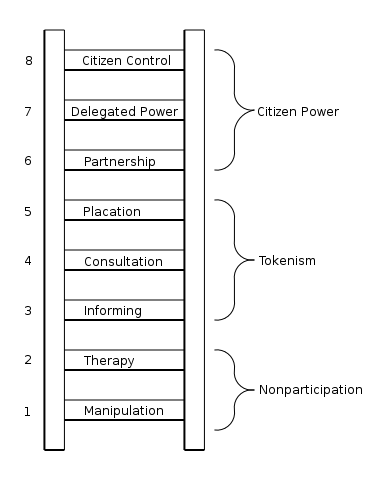
Ladder of citizen participation, Sherry Arnstein

Sherry Arnstein discusses eight types of participation in A Ladder of Citizen Participation (1969). Often termed as "Arnstein's ladder of citizen participation ", these are broadly categorized as:

- Citizen Power: Citizen Control, Delegated Power, Partnership.
- Tokenism: Placation, Consultation, Informing.
- Non-participation: Therapy, Manipulation.

She defines citizen participation as the redistribution of power that enables the have-not citizens, presently excluded from the political and economic processes, to be deliberately included in the future.

Robert Silverman expanded on Arnstein's ladder of citizen participation with the introduction of his "citizen participation continuum." In this extension to Arnstein's work he takes the groups that drive participation into consideration and the forms of participation they pursue. Consequently, Silverman's continuum distinguishes between grassroots participation and instrumental participation.

Archon Fung presents another classification of participation based on three key questions: Who is allowed to participate, and are they representative of the population? What is the method of communication or decision-making? And how much influence or authority is granted to the participation?

Other "ladders" of participation have been presented by D.M. Connor, Wiedemann and Femers, A. Dorcey et al., Jules N. Pretty and E.M. Rocha.

The International Association for Public Participation (IAP2) has developed a 'spectrum of public participation' based on five levels: information, consultation, involvement, collaboration and empowerment.

== Specific participation activities ==
- Town hall meeting
- Advisory committee
- Citizens' assembly
- Opinion poll
- Participatory design
- Participatory budgeting
- Referendum
- Protest
- Vote

== Corporate participation ==
Participation in the corporate sector has been studied as a way to improve business related processes starting from productivity to employee satisfaction.

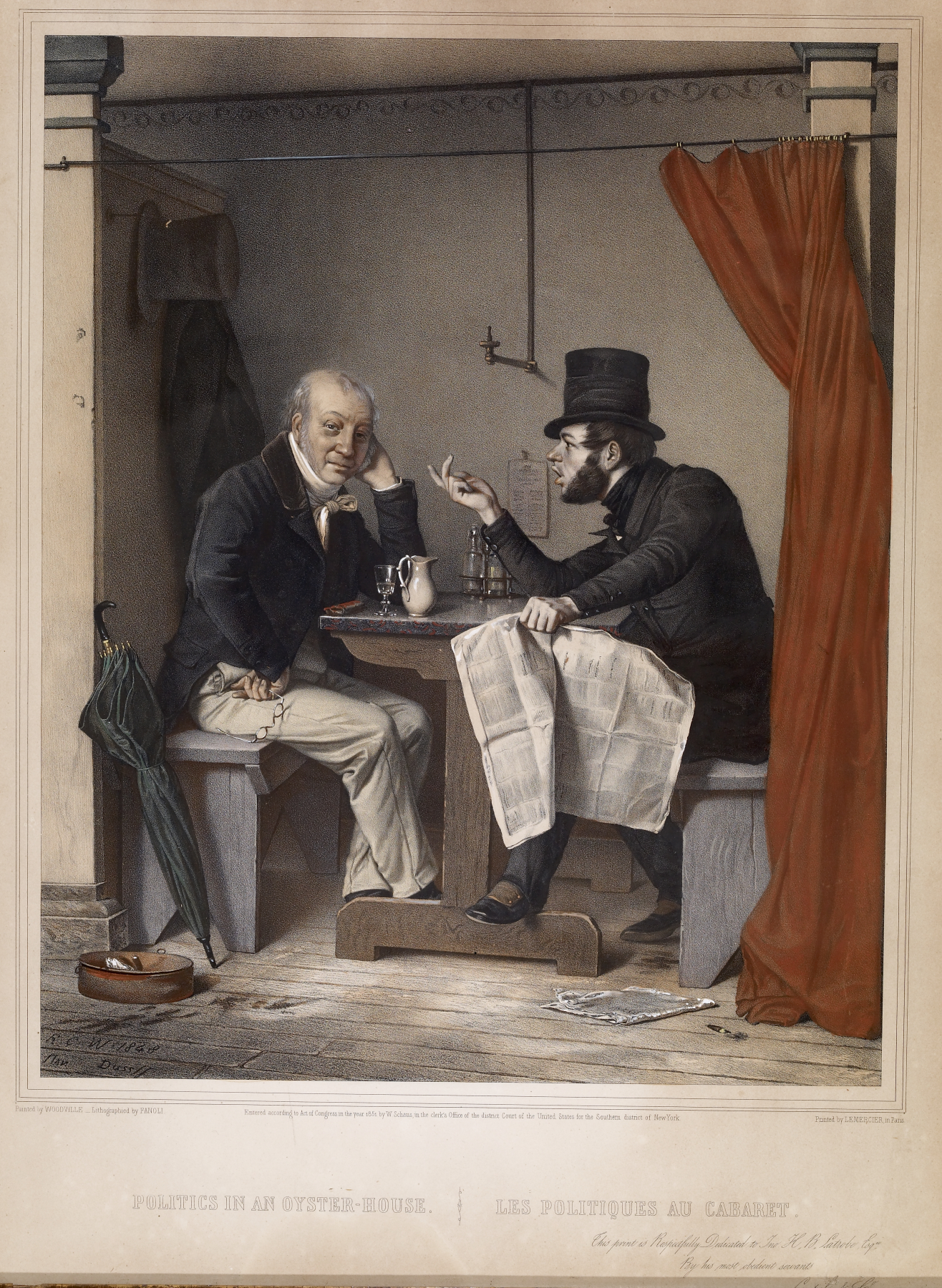
Michel Fanoli - Politics in an Oyster House Dedicated To HB Latrobe Esq - Walters 93145

== Cross-cultural participation ==
A cultural variation of participation can be seen through the actions of Indigenous American Cultures. Participation draws from two aspects: respect and commitment to their community and family. The respect is seen through their participation in non-obligated participation in various aspects of their lives, ranging from housework to fieldwork.

Often the participation in these communities is a social interaction occurring as a progression for the community, rather than that of the individual. Participation in these communities can serve as a "learning service". This learning ranges from everyday activities, in which community members gain a new skill to complete a task or participate through social events to keep their cultural practices alive. These social participation events allow newer generations to see the events and learn from this ongoing participation to continue these practices. Although there are different domains and objectives of participation in these communities, the bottom line to this participation is that it is non obligated and often community oriented.

One social interaction that continues to thrive because of this high level of non-obligation is the everyday act of translating.

== Objectives of participation ==
Participation activities may be motivated from an administrative perspective or a citizen perspective on a governmental, corporate or social level. From the administrative viewpoint, participation can build public support for activities. It can educate the public about an agency's activities. It can also facilitate useful information exchange regarding local conditions. Furthermore, participation is often legally mandated. From the citizen viewpoint, participation enables individuals and groups to influence agency decisions in a representational manner. The different types of political participation depend on motivation. When a group is determined to work to solve a community problem, this may include organizing marches or campaigning for candidates. Most immigrant racial groups have higher motivation since there is an increase in geographical dispersion and are faster growing racial groups. How well participation can influence the relation between citizen and their local government, how it increases trust and boosts peoples willingness to participate Giovanni Allegretti explains in an interview using the example of participatory budgeting.

== Participatory decision-making in science ==
Public participation in decision-making has been studied as a way to align value judgements and risk trade-offs with public values and attitudes about acceptable risk. This research is of interest for emerging areas of science, including controversial technologies and new applications.

In the United States, studies have demonstrated public support for increased participation in science. While public trust in scientists remains generally high in the United States, the public may rate scientists' ability to make decisions on behalf of society less highly. For example, a 2016–2017 survey of public opinion on CRISPR gene editing technology showed a "relatively broad consensus among all groups in support of the idea that the scientific community 'should consult with the public before applying gene editing to humans,'" providing a "broad mandate for public engagement."

The scientific community has struggled to involve the public in scientific decision-making. Abuses of scientific research participants, including well-known examples like the Tuskegee syphilis experiment, may continue to erode trust in scientists among vulnerable populations.

Additionally, past efforts to come to scientific consensus on controversial issues have excluded the public, and as a result narrowed the scope of technological risks considered. For example, at the 1975 Asilomar conference on recombinant DNA, scientists addressed the risks of biological contamination during laboratory experiments, but failed to consider the more varied public concerns that would surface with commercial adoption of genetically modified crops.

Researchers acknowledge that further infrastructure and investment is needed to facilitate effective participatory decision-making in science. A five-part approach has been suggested:

- Support effective science communication and engagement
- Capitalize on the strength of diverse coalitions
- Build capacity to deal with moving targets
- Focus on shared values
- Build trusting relationships through applied research and feedback loops

== Participation in heritage ==
Communities can be involved in local, regional and national cultural heritage initiatives, in the processes of creation, organisation, access, use and preservation. The internet has facilitated this, particularly via crowdsourcing, where the general public is asked to help contribute to shared goals, creating content, but also as a form of mutually beneficial engagement particularly with the collections and research of Galleries, Libraries, Archives, and Museums (GLAM). An example of this is the Transcribe Bentham project, where volunteers are asked to transcribe the manuscripts of the philosopher Jeremy Bentham. Challenges include: how to manage copyright, ownership, orphan works, access to open data from heritage organisations, how to build relationships with cultural heritage amateurs, sustainable preservation, and attitudes towards openness.

== Critiques of participation ==
Efforts to promote public participation have been widely critiqued. There is particular concern regarding the potential capture of the public into the sphere of influence of governance stakeholders, leaving communities frustrated by public participation initiatives, marginalized and ignored.

== Civic opportunity gap ==
Youth participation in civic activities has been found to be linked to a student's race, academic track, and their school's socioeconomic status. The American Political Science Task Force on Inequality and American Democracy has found that those with higher socioeconomic status participate at higher rates than those with lower status. A collection of surveys on student participation in 2008 found that "Students who are more academically successful or white and those with parents of higher socioeconomic status receive more classroom-based civic learning opportunities." Youth from disadvantaged backgrounds are less likely to report participation in school-based service or service-learning than other students. Students with more highly educated parents and higher household incomes are more likely to have the opportunity to participate in student government, give a speech, or develop debating skills in school.

== See also ==
- Accountable autonomy
- Argument map
- Collective intelligence
- Crowdsourcing
- e-participation
- Gerontocracy
- Knowledge deficit
- Integration of immigrants
- Low-information rationality
- Online participation
- Public relations
- Participatory economics
- Participatory politics
- Public participation
- Right to public participation
- Spatial citizenship
- The participatory approach
- Voter turnout
