= Dale Anglin =

American nonprofit executive

Dale Robinson Anglin
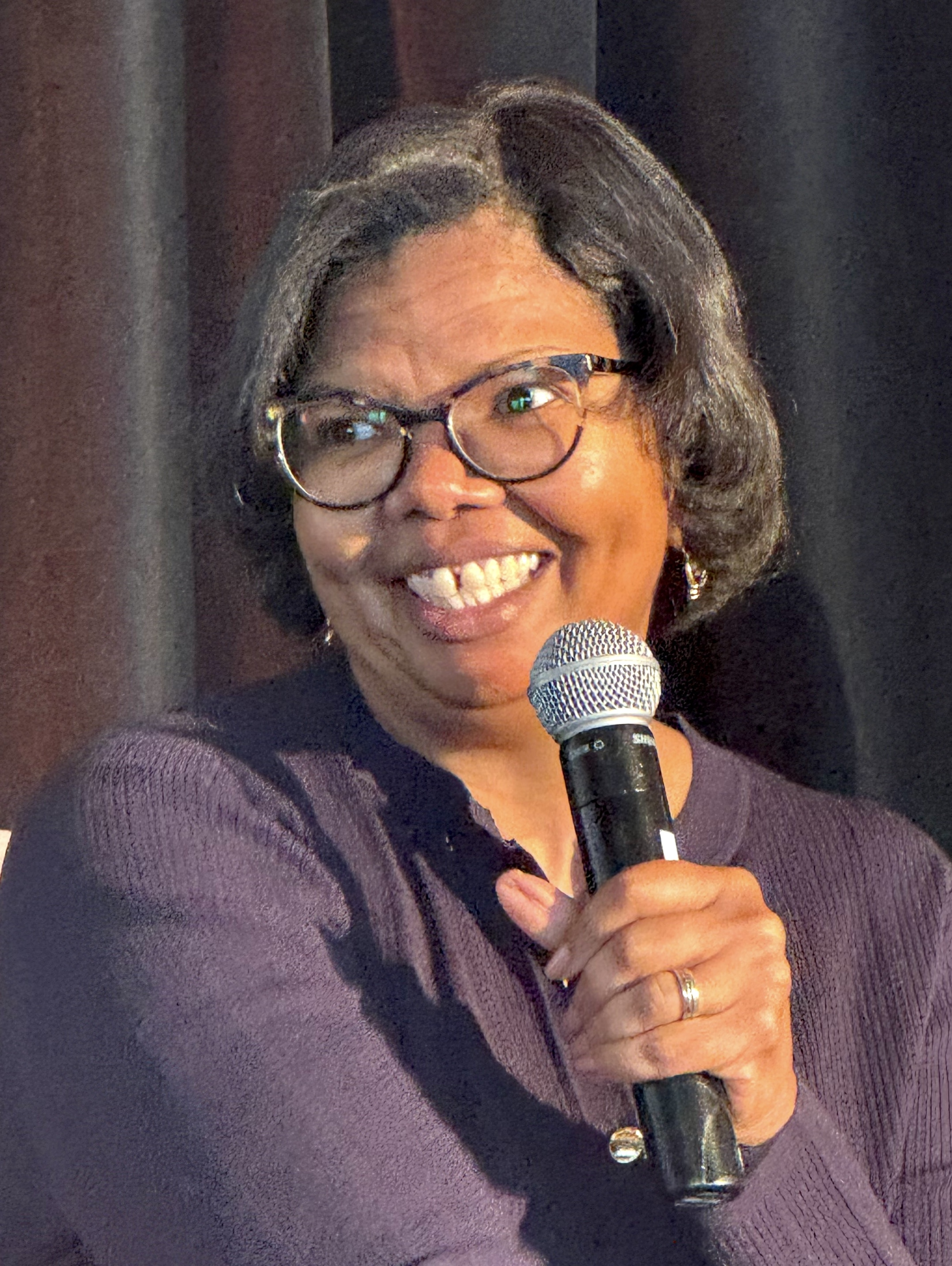
- Anglin in 2025
- Education: Smith College (BA); University of California, Berkeley (MA)
- Occupation: Nonprofit executive
- Employer: Press Forward
- Spouse: Roland Anglin
- Awards: George Voinovich Award; Luminary Award

Dale R. Anglin is an American nonprofit executive. In 2024, she became the inaugural director of the Press Forward initiative. She formerly worked at the Cleveland Foundation, the Victoria Foundation, and the New Community Corporation.

In 2022, Anglin received the inaugural George Voinovich Award, alongside Shana Marbury, for her impact on young people in the Cleveland community. In 2023, she was honored with the Luminary Award by the Open Doors Academy for her efforts toward out-of-school time learning.

== Early life and education ==
Anglin grew up in Chicago. She graduated from Smith College, with honors, with degrees in government and African American studies. Afterward, she earned a master's degree in public policy at the University of California, Berkeley with a focus on government and child development.

== Career ==
Anglin worked as a social analyst at the Congressional Research Service where she concentrated on childcare, health, and family issues. She then moved to Newark, New Jersey to work at the New Community Corporation as a director of resource development. Anglin was an Alfred P. Sloan Association for Public Policy and Management member, as well as the Association for Public Policy Analysis and Management's executive director.

From 2006 to 2017, Anglin served as the associate director for programs at the Victoria Foundation. She then joined the Cleveland Foundation as the program director for youth, health, and human services, after which she became its vice president for grantmaking and community impact. Starting in 2020, she helped raise over $20 million for the organization's Greater Cleveland COVID19 Rapid Response Fund. She also helped direct funding toward the Cleveland Documenters, Signal Cleveland, and The Marshall Project.

In February 2024, Anglin was announced as the inaugural director of the Press Forward initiative. She began her duties on March 11. In April, she circulated an open call for funding with an emphasis on projects that closed gaps in local news reportage and empowered community-based journalism. By October, she shared that 205 local news organizations would split a pool of $20 million.

Anglin has served on the boards of Signal Ohio, the Smith College Medal Committee, the Community Foundation of New Jersey, the Charlotte Newcombe Foundation, and AdoptAClassroom.org.

== Awards ==
- George Voinovich Award, 2022
- Luminary Award, 2023

== Personal life ==
Anglin's husband is Roland Anglin, Dean of the Levin College of Public Affairs and Education at Cleveland State University.
