= Suzanne Sena =

American television news anchor, correspondent, and actress

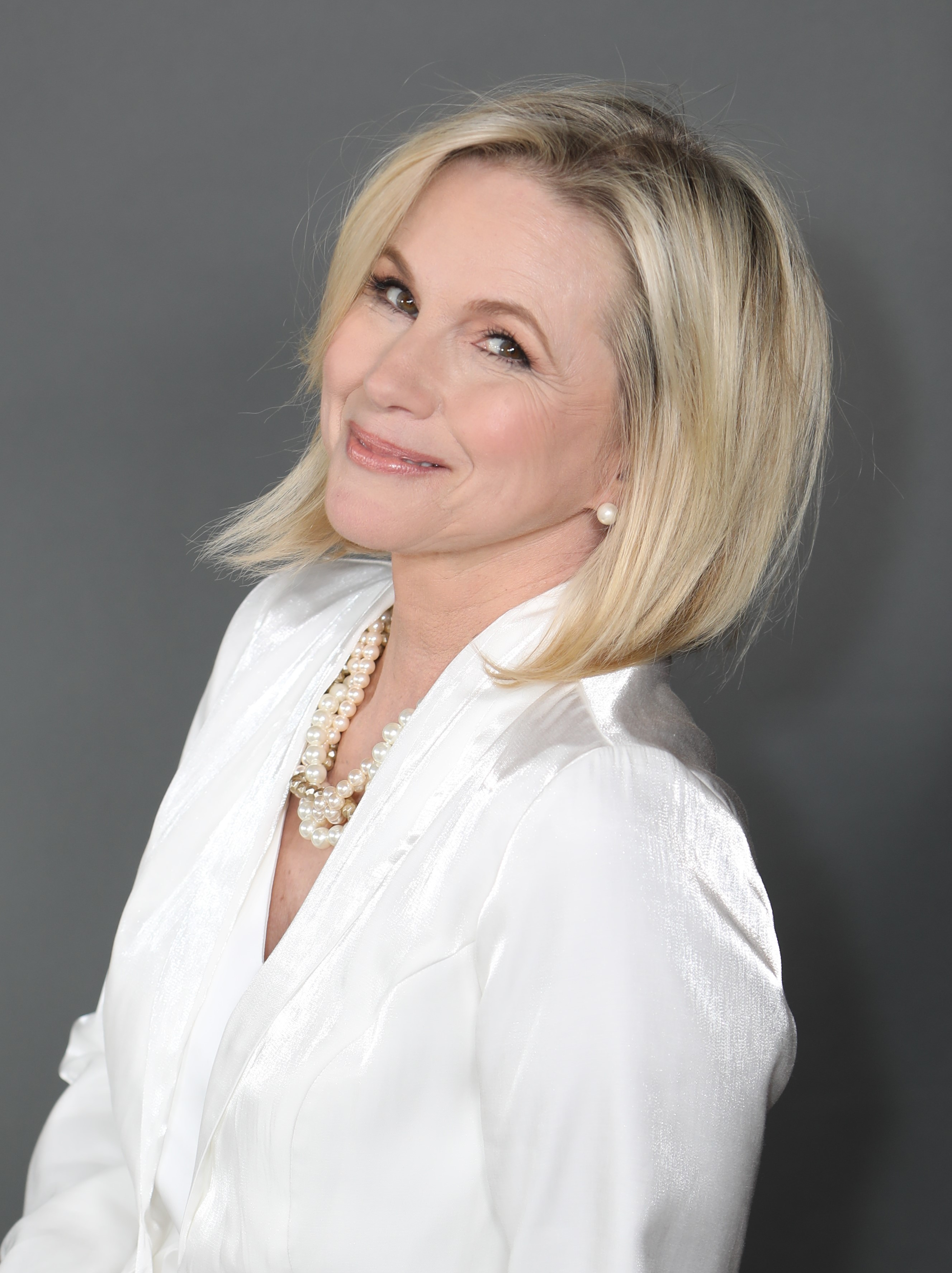
- Born: Suzanne Woronchak; April 2, 1963 (age 63); Dearborn, Michigan, U.S.
- Education: Michigan State University
- Occupation: Television personality
- Spouses: Scott Sena (m. 1991; div. 2000) Michael Fields (m. 2015)
- Website: http://www.suzannesena.com

Suzanne Sena (born 1963) is an American television personality, author, and actress. She is a former Fox News anchor and the founder of Sena-Series Media Training. She also played Brooke Alvarez on the comedic TV series Onion News Network.

== Career ==
Sena was born in Dearborn, Michigan. An Edsel Ford High School graduate, she has a Bachelor of Arts degree in communications from Michigan State University.

Sena started her national television career on E! Entertainment Television. While at E!, she was a fill-in anchor and correspondent for E! News Daily. Sena created, hosted and oversaw production on the reality-lifestyle celebrity series Out to Lunch and regularly appeared on the red carpet, hosting live coverage of events including the Emmy Awards and the Academy Awards.

Sena was considered a front runner in the search for Kathie Lee Gifford's replacement on Live with Regis, co-hosting with Regis Philbin for four shows. Both the New York Post and Entertainment Weekly cited Sena as the likely winner of the position.

From 2004 to 2006 Sena worked at Dallas-based KTVT-TV (CBS11). From 2006 to 2008, worked as an anchor at the Fox News Channel. She anchored the network's primetime news updates and handled breaking news in the overnight hours. While at Fox News, Sena made appearances on Red Eye w/ Greg Gutfeld and Fox and Friends, filling in as news anchor.

In 2010–2011, Sena portrayed star anchorwoman Brooke Alvarez on the IFC series Onion News Network, a satire of television journalism. Concurrently, she also hosted the online lifestyle reality show The Invested Life.

In 2014, Sena appeared in several popular episodic television series, including Castle, How to Get Away with Murder, Sullivan & Son, and the Amazon pilot Down Dog. She produced and co-starred in the comedic horror film Killer Party (2014), and starred in an independent movie.
