= Boisfeuillet Jones =

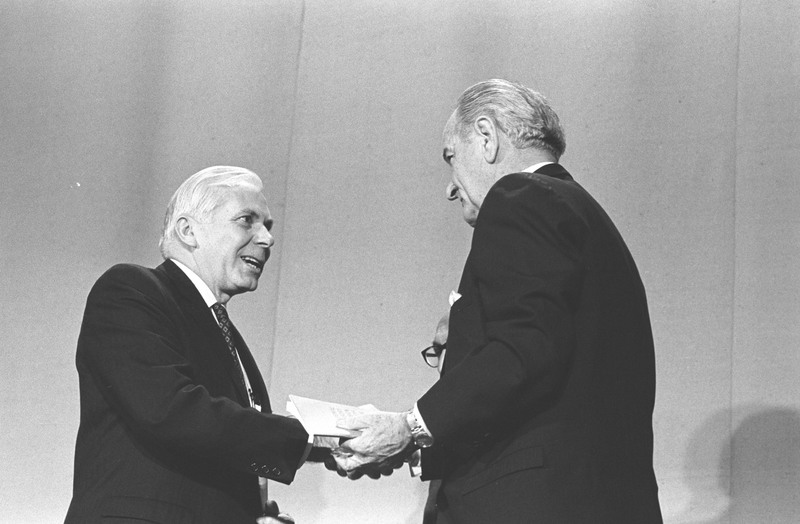
Jones (left) shaking hands with US President Lyndon B. Johnson in December 1968

Boisfeuillet Jones (January 22, 1913 in Macon, Georgia – July 18, 2001 in Atlanta, Georgia) was an American educator and president of several philanthropic organizations in Atlanta, Georgia, USA.

== Emory ==
Jones earned a J.D. degree from Emory University. He then worked at Emory from 1946 to 1960, first as an assistant professor of political science, and later dean of administration and a vice president.

== Government ==
In 1959, Mr. Jones became the chairman of a national committee investigating the quality of medical research. Then he worked with President John F. Kennedy, and he served in the Johnson administration as an authority on health policy.

== Philanthropy ==
Jones served as president of numerous philanthropic organizations in Atlanta. These included the Emily and Ernest Woodruff Foundation and the Robert W. Woodruff Foundation (from 1964 to 1988), and the Joseph B. Whitehead, Lettie Pate Whitehead and Lettie Pate Evans foundations (from 1972 to 1988).

== Legacy ==
The Boisfeuillet Jones Atlanta Civic Center, and the Boisfeuillet Jones Center (which houses some of Emory's administrative offices, including the Office of Financial Aid and the Career Center), are both named in honor of Jones.

== Family ==
Jones was the son of Frederick R. Jones (1874-1941) and Clare T. Boisfeuillet (1885-1981). He married Laura May Coit in 1940 and had two children, Laura Coit Jones, and Boisfeuillet Jones Jr. His first wife, Laura, died in 1949, and he married Anne Baynon Register in 1951. His son was publisher of the Washington Post from 2000 to 2008 and subsequently Vice Chairman of The Washington Post Company.
