= Sherry Arnstein =

American osteopathic physician and political theorist (1930–1997)

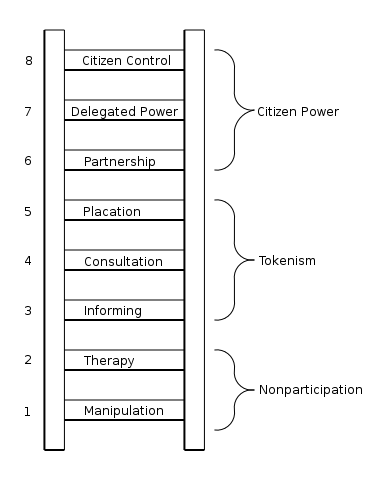
"Arnstein's ladder" of citizen participation

Sherry Phyllis Arnstein, (née Rubin) (11 January 1930 – 19 January 1997) was the author of the highly influential journal article "A Ladder of Citizen Participation". Working as a special assistant to the assistant secretary at the U.S. Department of Health, Education, and Welfare (HEW), she developed the insights that led to the development of her seminal paper in the field of participatory decision making.

In 1969, she wrote and published several papers that deal with public participation in decision making. Among them, "A Ladder of Citizen Participation" (1969), "Maximum Feasible Manipulation" (1972) and "A Working Model for Public Participation" (1975). Her first paper, in which she suggested different levels of public participation has a lasting impact in many areas of research, including geography, urban planning, public policy, health policy, and sociology, to name a few.

Sherry Rubin was born in New York City to Bernard Rubin (born Russia) and Lucille Goldstein (born France). At a young age, her family moved to California. She studied physical education at the University of California, Los Angeles (UCLA), and after graduation worked as a caseworker in Alameda County Juvenile Court. In 1955, she moved to Washington, D.C., and received a master's degree in communications from American University.

After her work at HUD, she was a consulting public policy analyst at Arthur D. Little, a senior research fellow at the National Center for Health Services Research, and vice president of the National Health Council. She served 10 years as executive director of the American Association of Colleges of Osteopathic Medicine (AACOM) between 1985 and 1995.
