= Press Forward =

American philanthropic coalition for local journalism

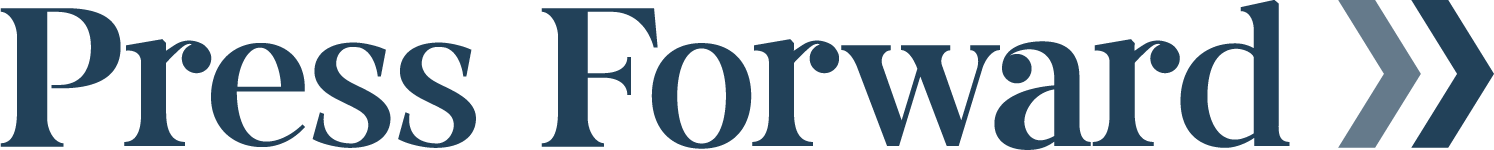
- Formation: September 2023
- Purpose: Philanthropy
- Headquarters: Miami, FL
- Director: Dale Anglin
- Website: pressforward.news

Press Forward is a philanthropic coalition of over 20 funders seeking to invest over half a billion dollars into local journalism in the United States over the course of five years. It was announced by the MacArthur Foundation in 2023 with grant disbursements planned starting in 2024. As of March 2024, Press Forward has been directed by Dale Anglin.

Press Forward's four priorities are bolstering local newsrooms, increasing news production and dissemination, addressing inequalities in journalism, and expanding local news through public policy. Since its creation, Press Forward has raised more than half a billion dollars, started over 20 regional Press Forward chapters, and funded hundreds of local news organizations.

== History ==
=== 2023 ===
In September, Press Forward was announced by the MacArthur Foundation as an initiative to disburse over half a billion dollars, over the course of five years, to support local journalism in the United States. Over twenty organizations, such as the Knight Foundation and the Ford Foundation, were named as participants.

In November, Press Forward announced Press Forward Locals, or regional chapters of Press Forward across the country. Many chapters would be led by existing organizations in their area.

In December, the MacArthur Foundation provided $48 million in grants to support Press Forward. It also launched the Local News Program to reshape its grantmaking strategy in line with Press Forward by providing grants directly to local news organizations.

=== 2024 ===
In February, Dale R. Anglin was announced as the inaugural director of the $500 million Press Forward initiative. She began her duties on March 11 of that year.

In April, Press Forward announced its first-ever open call for funding with a specific focus on providing funds to local newsrooms in underserved communities.

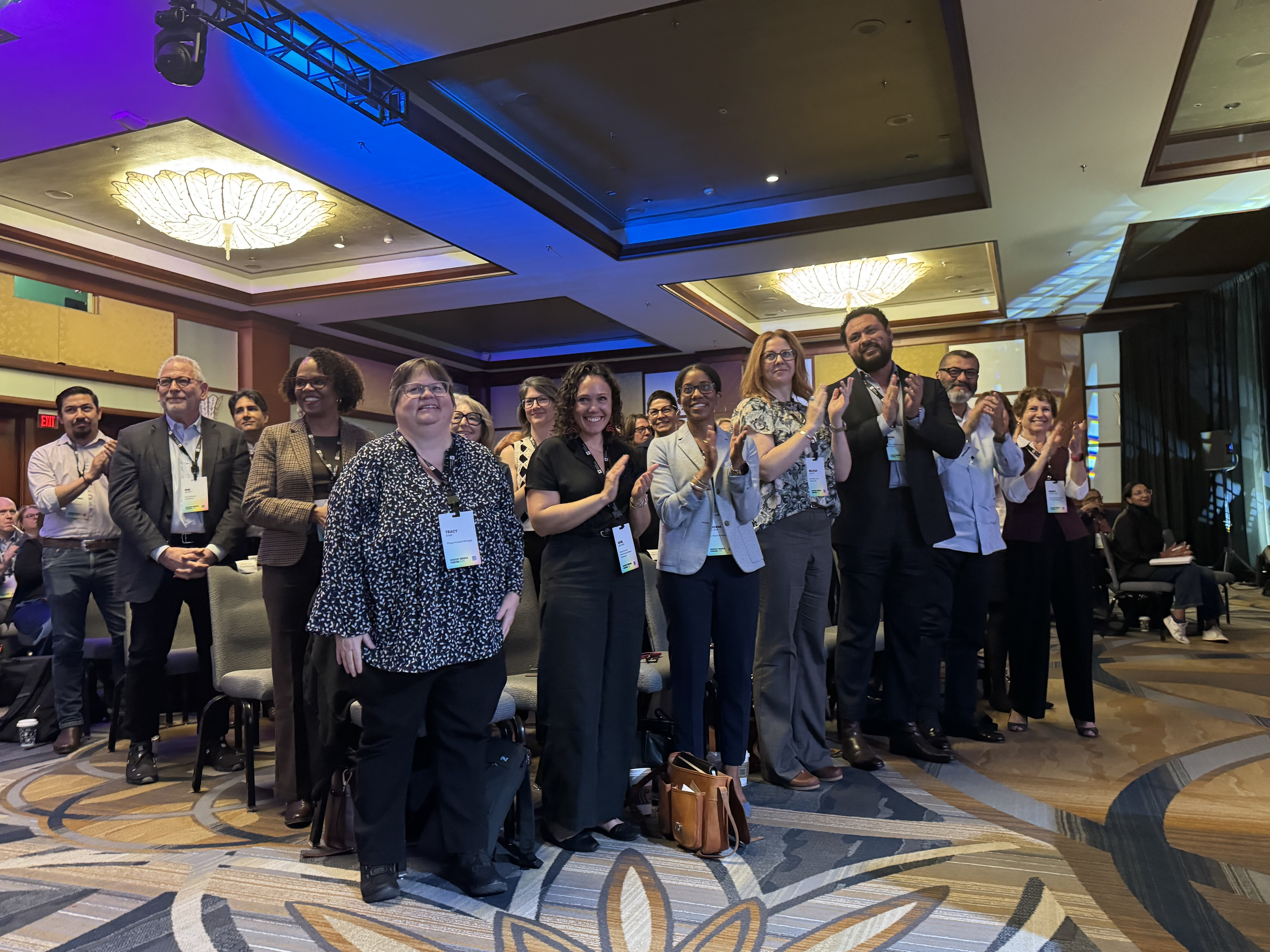
Press Forward funders at the 2025 Knight Media Forum

In July, the Knight Foundation pledged $7 million, toward the Press Forward initiative, to bolster local news in swing states due to concerns about the lack of access to quality information during election cycles.

In October, Press Forward announced that 205 local news organizations would receive a share of $20 million, roughly around $100,000 per recipient. Recipients included Alaska News Coalition, Black Voice News, Grice Connect, MediaLab@FAU, Mshale, The Mesquite at Texas A&M University–San Antonio, QCity Metro, among others. At least one organization in each state, and two U.S. territories, was awarded. The same month, the Knight Foundation pledged $15 million in eight cities.

In December, the MacArthur Foundation committed another $20 million, through its Local News Program, to further support Press Forward initiatives.

== Critical reception ==
Immediately after the announcement of Press Forward, over 120 public media organizations endorsed a paper calling upon public media to be included in its funding decisions.

Similarly, the Maynard Institute for Journalism Education published an open letter demanding that Press Forward specifically support underrepresented voices in local news. Many organizations signed the letter including the National Association of Black Journalists, the Asian American Journalists Association, the Indigenous Journalists Association, the National Association of Hispanic Journalists, the Online News Association, and OpenNews, among others. Black-led news organizations, in particular, demanded "structural change" rather than "lip service," as well as even more money raised to support local newsrooms. In November of 2023, a webinar was hosted by the Maynard Institute for Journalism and Education and Borealis Philanthropy to allow journalists of color to speak with leaders involved in Press Forward such as MacArthur Foundation president John Palfrey.

== Controversies ==
Following its first open call, Press Forward funded St. Louis Argus, a local publication that had historically stolen reportage from other news outlets in St. Louis. Press Forward then put a "pause" on its $100,000 grant to the newspaper in order to investigate allegations of plagiarism.

== Partners ==
- Alfred P. Sloan Foundation
- Archewell Foundation
- Carnegie Corporation of New York
- Community Foundation of the Land of Lincoln
- Democracy Fund
- Ford Foundation
- Glen Nelson Center at American Public Media Group
- Knight Foundation
- Heising-Simons Foundation
- Henry Luce Foundation
- Joyce Foundation
- KFF
- Lenfest Institute for Journalism
- Lumina Foundation
- MacArthur Foundation
- Mary Graham
- McKnight Foundation
- Outrider Foundation
- Rita Allen Foundation
- Robert Wood Johnson Foundation
- Skyline Foundation
- Steinman Institute
- William and Flora Hewlett Foundation
