= Onion News Network =

Television show

- Genre: Parody; Satire
- Written by: Alexander Blechman; Lang Fisher; John Harris; Peter Koechley; Carol Kolb; Dan Mirk; Michael Pielocik; Will Tracy; Chris Sartinsky; Jack Kukoda
- Directed by: J.J. Adler; Will Graham; Jon Watts
- Starring: Brian Huskey; Suzanne Sena; Kyla Grogan
- Country of origin: United States
- Original language: English
- No. of seasons: 2
- No. of episodes: 20

Production
- Running time: 22 minutes

Original release
- Network: IFC
- Release: January 21 – December 9, 2011

Onion News Network is a parody television news show produced by The Onion that originated as a YouTube video series in 2007 and was further developed into a 22-minute television program in 2011, with two seasons of ten episodes aired on IFC.

In September 2024, The Onion relaunched Onion News Network on its YouTube page, starring former MSNBC host Joshua Johnson as ONN anchor Dwight Richmond, as well as the return of Jeremy Beiler as ONN (now senior) correspondent Jason Copeland.

== History ==
In mid-2006, The Onion began developing Onion News Network in response to the growth of web video content, investing $1 million in its production and hiring 15 staffers. Staff distrusted the project as The Onion Movie was languishing in production hell, but they ultimately settled on a format mocking Fox News. Carol Kolb, former editor-in-chief of The Onion, returned as ONN's head writer, while Will Graham and Julie Smith served as executive producers.

An initial iteration of In the Know using Julie Brister and Brian Huskey of the improv group Upright Citizens Brigade was rejected in favor of scripted segments. This experience also prompted all Onion News Network series to primarily hire former news anchors over professional actors to match the cadence of cable news.

In March 2007, Onion News Network launched as a daily web video broadcast. In 2011, The Onion adapted Onion News Network into a TV show that aired on IFC, while its Onion Sports Network was adapted into an Onion SportsDome TV show for Comedy Central. IFC paid $500,000 per ONN episode, while Comedy Central paid $750,000 per Onion SportsDome episode, both of which helped financially support The Onion in the aftermath of the 2008 financial crisis diminishing newspaper advertising.

Season 1 of ONN aired on Friday nights at 10 pm. For Season 1, the series was the only scripted live-action comedy series in the United States to employ non-union writers. However, the writers unionized between Seasons 1 and 2 in the midst of a strike threat. (Note: Attributed to multiple sources.) IFC renewed Onion News Network for a second season, which was sponsored by Acura. Season 2 aired on Tuesdays for the first three episodes before moving back to Friday nights with the November 18, 2011, episode. In March 2012, IFC announced that they had not renewed ONN for a third season. After the show's cancellation, a pilot for a new series titled Onion News Empire premiered on Amazon Prime Video, which presented a fictitious "behind-the-scenes look" of The Onion's "newsroom". It was not picked up for a full series.

== Cast ==
- Suzanne Sena as Brooke Alvarez
- Todd Alan Crain as Tucker Hope #8 (Season 1)
- Ryan Blackwell as Tucker Hope #9 (Season 2)
- Matt Oberg as Tucker Hope #10 (Season 2)
- Brad Holbrook as Jim Haggerty
- Tracy Toth as Tracy Gill
- Brian Huskey as Duncan Birch
- Julie Brister as Lauralee Hickock
- Klea Blackhurst as Shelby Cross
- Dorothi Fox as Nancy Fichandler
- Jeremy Beiler as Jason Copeland
- John Cariani as Michael Falk (the autistic reporter)
- Malachy Cleary as David Barrodale (whose opinions are sponsored by Acura)
- Ester David as Jane Carmichael
- Peak Kwinarian as Brandon Armstrong
- Chaunteé Schuler as Angelique Clark
- Michele Ammon as Jean Anne Whorton
- Kyla Grogan as Andrea Bennett
- Jill Dobson as Madison Daly
- George Riddle as Joad Cressbeckler
- Aaron Lazar as O'Brady Shaw (season 2)
- Michael Torpey as Dan Carlysle, political expert
- Joshua Johnson as Dwight Richmond
- Bobby Rivers as Professor Robert Haige

Oberg was the only actor to appear on two different television shows produced by The Onion. Oberg portrayed Mark Shepard in Onion SportsDome and portrayed the "tenth" Tucker Hope on Onion News Network.

=== Guests ===
Rachel Maddow and Mike Huckabee appeared as themselves in the fourth episode. Ben Stiller appeared as himself on episode 9, in a fake PSA for "Shaken Man-Child Syndrome". Glenn Beck appeared as himself on the November 1, 2011, episode involving a fictional PBS Frontline documentary about Brooke Alvarez's checkered past which in part may explain her on-air icy demeanor. Beck stated that while auditioning for the part of anchor of FactZone, he implied that Alvarez cut his brake lines and his car ended up in a ditch. Ted Allen appeared on the "Today Now!" special, showing how to cook a dish from his "new book" Pretentious Foodie Bullshit.

== Recurring segments ==
To further invoke the atmosphere of a 24-hour network, The Onion produces the following video series:

- Today Now!: Parody of morning lifestyle and news programs such as NBC's Today and ABC's Good Morning America. Hosted by Jim Haggerty (Brad Holbrook) and Tracy Gill (Tracy Toth), the style is typical of the breezy style often found in morning network television shows, with the presenters uncritical or completely oblivious to the subject matter, regardless of its absurdity (e.g., Haggerty's earnest question about whether an omelet recipe strictly requires a metal shoe-horn to measure the butter into the pan). The series was featured within Porkin Across America.
- War For The White House: ONN's continuing coverage of Presidential and midterm elections, opening with a dramatic video apparently depicting Air Force One and a squadron of fighter planes seemingly attacking the White House. Notable for its consistent use of military terminology (e.g. "Election Analysis Bunker") and deadpan style.
- The Onion Review: Weekly news updates from “America's Finest News Source”
- Onion Special Report: In-depth news coverage accompanied by additional news coverage on theonion.com
- Onion Film Standard: Onion Film Critic Peter K. Rosenthal (Ron Rains) reviews movies both new and old.
- Onion Tips: A self-help style video series that gives suggestions for how people can better themselves and their lives
- Onion Sports Network: A reference to ESPN, OSN usually features clips from SportsDome, a parody of ESPN's SportsCenter. The clips usually focus on parodies of specific SportsCenter segments such as the Budweiser Hot Seat, which becomes The Steam Room on OSN. Hosts present in the jocular style synonymous with ESPN and sportscasters appear on sets that are near-identical knockoffs of the SportsCenter studios. On January 11, 2011, cable network Comedy Central launched Onion SportsDome, an offshoot of the OSN feature, marking the first time an ONN feature became a full-fledged television series. It was cancelled in June 2011.
- News Room: A parody of breaking news segments that appear during commercial breaks or replays on 24-hour news networks. News Room is set in the fictional 24-hour cable news television network's news room with TV's and switchboards in the background. It featured "Tech Trends" as a newsroom segment about technology.
- Tough Season: A mockumentary-style series examining the world of fantasy football starring real NFL athletes
- StarFix: Parody of Access Hollywood
- In The Know: A parody of Sunday morning talk shows like The McLaughlin Group and Meet the Press. The show's full title is In The Know With Clifford Banes. Banes himself is almost never present, with fill-in anchors giving absurd reasons for his absences. The one and only time Banes actually shows up for work, he's wearing a perfect latex mask of Julianna McKannis, one of his substitute anchors.
- Autistic Reporter Michael Falk: A recurring character played by John Cariani

== Episodes ==
=== Season 1 (2011) ===
No.	Title	Original release date
1	"Enter The FactZone"	January 21, 2011
Teenage white girl to be tried as a black adult, Kim Jong-il agrees to suspend nuclear program in exchange for lead role in next Batman film, terrorists deny kidnapped ONN reporter access to make-up, today NOW! inquired as to how a rescued girl will make up for the loss of a firefighter, ONN viewer is a boring, annoying, ugly woman with a cheating husband, and mentally handicapped son, FDA Commissioner urges Americans to "just eat a goddamn vegetable once in a while", states requiring sex offenders to wear identifying clothes in public, Biden band reuniting to play Super Bowl, Sarah Palin presidential polls boosted by morbid curiosity, perfectly good tire just sitting there behind the deli, another time traveling soldier harassed Suri Cruise, and this day in history the handjob was invented.
2	"Snowlocaust"	January 28, 2011
Snow storm causing major problems for the nation's idiots, and leaving thousands without access to pornography, forecast of possible light snow triggers emergency response from the entire government, Department of Defense allows women to serve in combat with supervising male chaperon, Cruise family increases security in response to continued time traveler attacks, Congress can't remember how to pass a bill, al-Qaeda planting decoy Muslims to make people think they're peaceful, those 7 asshole snowmobilers still not lost or hurt, Snowstorm killer still at large, people are sad about dead woman, time travelers interrupt report on protest, and the Memphis murderer needs to try harder if he wants Brooke Alvarez to pay attention.
3	"Man-Horse Marriage"	February 4, 2011
Anti-gay Congressman allegedly spending time romantically with a horse, Supreme Court rules talkative Arizona man does not have freedom of speech, today NOW! reported live from the annual Valentine's Day stoning of an unbearably happy couple, miners still trapped in jobs mining, U.S. deploys military strike to aid relief efforts in Iran train derailment, nation's repairman Ron will be fixing the nation's infrastructure tomorrow, Mac fans cutting off hands for release of iHand tomorrow, 'higher' support legalization of marijuana, autopsy of pilot in plane wreckage determines pilot too charred to fly, citizens of Pennington, Illinois anticipating major brawl between Carl and Jerry over Megan, today in history the Civil Rights Act mandated racism be made less obvious, Los Angeles residents join to obey instructions from vibrating obelisk to protect Suri Cruise, and the Memphis murderer is still unimpressive.
4	"Fifth Anniversary"	February 11, 2011
Heroic student killed potentially harmful outcasts, regular human Zorla Gorgalon gave birth to 352 children, crying woman making people uncomfortable, female escort claims to have slept with some famous, handsome Hollywood actor whose last name starts with 'B', first openly drunk senator elected, one in five teens illegally enriching uranium, wife of Congressman caught in affair with a horse coping through throw pillows, and anarchy erupts after discovery that U.S. constitution is expired.
5	"The Trial of TR-425"	February 18, 2011
Wolf Blitzer is a pathetic man, all unequal groups receive casinos, military drone TR-425 answers for its crimes in court, President Obama seems to hate his dog, climatologists appear to be trying to communicate something, first openly drunk senator accused of drunken campaign promises, Department of Health and Human Services bans the nation's Shawnas from using tanning salons, DreamWorks Animation to receive the Oscar lifetime achievement award for "giving divorced dads something to do with their kids", PETA demands an end to using chickens to randomly select Oscar winners, sources within Howie Mandel's imagination report that he will be hosting the Oscars, the Democratic Party is seeking counseling to resolve their issues, train is okay after hitting a man, and teenage pregnancy rates in Pennington, Illinois are up thirty percent due to Cody.
6	"Cyber Attack"	February 25, 2011
Al-Qaeda launches crippling cyber-attack beginning with an image of a pig in boots, legislators should use illegal immigrants to write immigration reform bill to save money, missing teens found drowned in dangerous bathtub, first openly drunk senator to spend more time drinking, everyone would be safer if they had their own justice shed, seven-hour-long audio sex tape featuring celebrity Garrison Keillor leaked, FDA Commissioner urges Americans to wash hands after using restroom following E. coli outbreak, genetically engineered food safety questioned after corn begs for death, undercover investigation into the intentions of a waitress inconclusive, man who shit in pants in elementary school receives Purple Heart, and this day in history The Lindy Hop was a popular anti-semitic dance.
7	"The Real Obama"	March 4, 2011
Congress passes bill making incomprehensible shouting the official language of the United States, GoldenMade factory explosion results in flood of corn syrup, Federal Dating Agency adjusts datings standards to a record low, child who witnessed the murder of his parents is on the path to becoming a real-life Batman, real Obama found after revelations that a lookalike took his place two years ago, fifty-two injured in attack on LAX by film director Michael Bay, Conair recalls wand massagers after discovery of unintended uses, Congress passes new law providing workers six minutes per day to cry in stairwell, Joe Biden unveils anticipated Vice President uniform, Shelby Cross urges Americans to secretly film those engaged in sexual activity to curb public indecency, entire town attends parade for the town's only gay man, Oklahoma state legislature passes bill allowing doctors to perform fake abortions, and this day in 1929 doctors eliminated the slide whistle sound that accompanied falling pants.
8	"Stock Market Crash"	March 11, 2011
Stock markets crash as traders realize humans are capable of error, Republicans rally a man for presidency due to his disinterest in politics, Obama requests Americans pretend to not be classless idiots while French leader visits, Osama bin Laden suspected to be hiding near set of TV show "Bin Laden Live", FDA Commissioner gives up on convincing Americans to eat healthy, Officials intend to discuss that North Korea destroyed Asia, GoldenMade CEO claims his company is not responsible for deaths due to massive corn syrup flood, study proves Comic Sans is funny, UFO sightings proven to be hoax perpetrated by aliens, regular Americans resistant to speaking their mind on Congress proposal to save money by cutting States from the Union, today NOW! featured the inspirational story of Amanda McCormick overcoming great difficulties to have sex with LeBron James, and Fox News misinformed viewers about Clyde the Cat.
9	"Real America"	March 18, 2011
Congress renewed funding for CIA program 'Facebook', Diplomatic talks between Washington and Real Americans have begun, New York Senator criticized for taking cheap bribes, Supreme Court supports law allowing citizen's right to carry gun at head level, rumors of Supreme Court Justice's health triggers speculation on which disease will kill him, Brooke Alvarez condemns songs for issuing commands to DJs, heroic high school student refuses to participate in foreign language courses, reality show following former warlord renewed for second season, states suffering from high fructose corn syrup spill hit with BBQ flavoring cloud, Shaken Manchild Syndrome on the rise, and this day in 600 BC Japan was founded by tentacle porn enthusiasts.
10	"American Dream"	March 25, 2011
Last U.S. citizen gives up on American Dream, Damaged Women's Coalition demand attention from Congress, protestors concerned adopted children of gay couples harmed by their protests, future National American Dream Memorial to dissolve and collapse, Americans celebrate no longer having to pretend they had not given up their dreams, NASA launched mission to explore New Mexico, Jeff Gordon donated $2 million to charity focused on ending his illiteracy, Biden replaces Secret Service with sexy female bodyguards, no one will ever invent something better than the American-invented zipper, victim count continues to increase after accidental release of 34 Katherine Heigl films, and Obama declares the new American Dream to be motorcycle ownership.

=== Season 2 (2011) ===
It was announced on March 22, 2011, that IFC had picked up the show for a second season due to premiere on October 4, 2011.

No.	Title	Original release date
11	"Asteroid Heads to Earth"	October 4, 2011
Asteroid set to destroy Earth in 30 minutes, screenwriter's plan to stop asteroid with attractive everymen failed miserably, Shelby Cross intends to rule the post-apocalyptic world, UN releases apocalypse-themed progressive rock concept album created with entire emergency fund, the First Responders analyze a new bill prevents the friend-less from purchasing guns (only to decay into a rant how they want to punch Brooke in her "goddamn, bitch face"), today NOW! interviews boy about his "totally awesome" encounter with a shark, sluts and muscle-bound douchebags gathered in military bunker to repopulate the earth, this day in 1982 the first boom-box carrying rollerskater was elected to congress, guy born with goddamn stupid-looking face finds solace in Association of Americans with Hateful Faces, and Mayor who counterfeited coupons to save $14.81 has resigned.
12	"Missing Baby Kate"	October 11, 2011
Brooke Alvarez is now single, government warning country of impending release of rap ballads about fatherhood by Jay-Z, attempted kidnapping of Michelle Obama by obese extremists due to her un-American food portion reduction stance failed, Steve Jobs 2 announced by Apple, U.S. alliance with Israel unharmed by attack on U.S., Obama's approval rating increases after punching banker, Shelby Cross instructs ONN viewers to thoroughly search their neighbor's homes for missing Baby Kate, banker punched by Obama promptly assaulted by reporters at press conference, FOX's X-Factor attempts to compete with quietly sitting in the dark, HBO's Boardwalk Empire being retooled to take place in modern day New Jersey, Sci-fi fans debating how producers will eventually ruin FOX's Terra Nova, ONN's O'Brady Shaw over-emotionally reports death of teen he didn't know, First Responders ponder how best to kill random civilians with robots, and Biden proudly announces shit he took on the NY Stock Exchange.
13	"Fantasy Brainwall"	October 18, 2011
Brooke Alvarez will always be the face of cable news, comatose former congressman running for president, potentially dangerous self-defense instructors know all your moves, First Responders totally watched the GOP debate, O'Brady Shaw is a compassionate dog-slayer tomorrow night on Gut Check, soldiers in Afghanistan sad about some men dying but happy about other men dying, Kanye West and Syria in conflict, defective Hot plates won't be recalled since people who buy them are obviously pathetic, Biden launches fitness program aimed at making youthful American women more attractive, comatose presidential candidate quits after caught receiving oral sex from nurse, and O'Brady Shaw rudely leaves during his report.
14	"Dead Reporter"	October 25, 2011
Onion reporter died in brothel fire while recording part 412 of his report on the Eastern European sex trade, Shelby Cross recommends keeping kids safe from pedophiles on Halloween by sedating and keeping them in your basement until morning, corporate tax cut deal struck allows Republicans to kick Obama in the balls, Republicans accused of slowing things down due to moving in slow motion, search and rescue efforts for missing hikers continue even though they are probably dead, high unemployment rate found to be caused by Illinois man who has 42,000 jobs, small town spitefully welcomes back failed aspiring musician who had left to the big city, hackers responsible for malfunction of actress January Jones, and the eccentric billionaire who single-handedly funds Chuck ends the series due to loneliness of being its only viewer.
15	"Exposed, Brooke Alvarez"	November 1, 2011
Brooke Alvarez's cold personality is a result of her childhood trauma in the Russian space program, Obama puts CEO of highly profitable and terrible tasting beverage in charge of U.S. economy, Tea Party activist running for seat in Supreme Court, Gavin Fisher goes undercover as stereotypical Chinese personas to investigate counterfeit goods, O'Brady Shaw rushes to the scene of a shooting that may or may not have happened, crazy woman Michele Bachmann claims to be treated differently than crazy men, environmentalist claims that bogs and marshes aren't just dead body landfills, opinion polls up for Mitt Romney after prostitute admits to paying him for sex, and the plan for stimulating the economy is coconuts.
16	"Today Now! Special"	November 11, 2011
In a rebroadcast of today NOW!: Search for missing fat black man continues, medical expert Dr. Kareem Mazari talks about children who refuse to take off their costume after Halloween, Applebee's new advertising campaign suggests hipsters dine there ironically, Jim and Tracy investigate discrimination against obese people by going undercover, attractive blonde woman questioned in case of missing fat black man, high school girls run clothing charity drive for their peers, chef demonstrates how to prepare needlessly expensive and time-wasting food, local weather conditions are vulgar, award-winning country artist's new album inspired by true stories of rural life and meth, and a man claiming to be the missing fat black man complains the news coverage is ruining the sick call he made to his employer.
17	"Sex in America"	November 18, 2011
Mystery candidate leading GOP presidential polls, new robot warns masturbators of people approaching, government officials sick of dealing with Afghanistan, Russia asked by NASA to stop filming porn on International Space Station, the First Responders debate whether it's fair for employers to check out applicants' personal Internet sex videos, imprisoned millionaire not appreciative of rigid jail routine, Shelby Cross suggests changing your identity every three years to avoid identity theft, Obama reelection campaign asks voters not to make his daughters change schools, and Tucker Hope interviews pole-dancing stripper about fire in strip club.
18	"Artificial Intelligence"	December 2, 2011
Thousands trapped on couch by Confessions: Animal Hoarding marathon, people with facial tattoos face discrimination from potential employers, Mahmoud Ahmadinejad faces criticism for admirative comments toward Jews, older Hispanic men assemble at theaters in anticipation of new Twilight film, Beyond The Facts investigates basement spouse arguments, O'Brady Shaw comforts the wife and children of a missing soldier, this day in 1969 Apollo 12 crew-members cleaned up Apollo 11's trash on the moon, smell in local library identified as weed, and the First Responders discuss the studio's new-found sentience.
19	"Brooke vs. O'Brady"	December 9, 2011
O'Brady Shaw co-hosts as a woman's loud voice disturbs the nation, new weight-loss drug causes nightmarish hallucinations around food, parents tribute dead son by continuing to update his Tumblr with insults, SIURT investigates whether SIURT reporter is responsible for ruining his family's Thanksgiving, situation worsens as loud woman has private conversation, black part of town moves across local river, Congress suggests Obama ask loud woman to quiet down, this year's hottest holiday present is Chinese Paint, and the nation is relieved as Brooke Alvarez confronts the loud woman.
20	"Year in Review"	December 9, 2011
In a review of the year's top headlines: Obese Osama bin Laden found, Queen consummates her grandson's marriage to Kate Middleton, Fukushima mutants reassure public that claims of radiation danger are baseless, nation shocked as someone shot in 1 of 30 daily shootings, something either good or bad to happen as result of Cairo uprising, pop music industry continues assault on good taste with latest star K'Ronikka, renewable sustainable energy source encoded in Charlie Sheen's rants, and O'Brady Shaw wins ONN person of the year.

== Critical reception ==
Onion News Network received generally positive reviews from television critics. Michael Deacon of The Daily Telegraph described it as one "glorious blizzard of absurdity and bathos", while Jack Seale from Radio Times called it a "densely packed, highly intelligent comedy you’ll want to watch for a second or third time". Neil Genzlinger of The New York Times wrote that Onion News Network makes other satirical news programs "sluggish by comparison", before going on to say: "If the longstanding SNL segment is a sort of introductory course in wringing humor from headlines, and Mr. Stewart's Daily Show is the advance-level class, Onion News Network is graduate school, requiring much quicker thinking and a greater tolerance for comfort-zone invasion".

Zoe Williams of The Guardian gave a mixed review of the first episode, stating that, "even by the opening credits I was smiling so much I had a sore face". However, she was critical of the content. "Persistently, where the programme could rip into one thing, it instead chooses something more peripheral, more candyflossy," Williams wrote. Williams criticized a sketch relating to racism in the US judicial system, saying: "This is the kind of thing Jon Stewart could say with one eyebrow or the judicious rolling back of his wheelie presenter's chair. It's true, racism in the American judicial system is certainly worth lambasting, but there just isn't the complexity in the issue to warrant a satirical news story that goes on for four minutes."

In April 2009, the program was awarded a Peabody Award noting that the publication provides "ersatz news that has a worrisome ring of truth."

== Legacy ==
In September 2024, The Onion relaunched Onion News Network on its YouTube page, starring former MSNBC host Joshua Johnson as ONN anchor Dwight Richmond.

== International airdates ==
- Australia: Program premiered The Comedy Channel in October 2011. It also airs on ABC2.
- Canada: Airs on Super Channel. Confusingly, the front page of the Canadian edition of The Onion carries the same promotional banner as the U.S. editions, incorrectly implying that ONN is carried by IFC Canada.
- United Kingdom: Program premiered on Sky Arts 1 on November 26, 2011
