= Movie 43 =

2013 American anthology comedy film

- Theatrical release poster
- Directed by: Steven Brill; Peter Farrelly; Will Graham; Steve Carr; Griffin Dunne; James Duffy; Jonathan van Tulleken; Elizabeth Banks; Patrik Forsberg; Brett Ratner; Rusty Cundieff; James Gunn; Bob Odenkirk; Steve Baker; Damon Escott
- Written by: Steve Baker; Ricky Blitt; Will Carlough; Tobias Carlson; Jacob Fleisher; Patrik Forsberg; Will Graham; James Gunn; Claes Kjellstrom; Jack Kukoda; Bob Odenkirk; Bill O'Malley; Matthew Alec Portenoy; Greg Pritikin; Rocky Russo; Olle Sarri; Elizabeth Wright Shapiro; Jeremy Sosenko; Jonathan van Tulleken; Jonas Wittenmark
- Produced by: Charles B. Wessler; John Penotti; Peter Farrelly; Ryan Kavanaugh
- Starring: Elizabeth Banks; Kristen Bell; Halle Berry; Leslie Bibb; Kate Bosworth; Gerard Butler; Josh Duhamel; Anna Faris; Richard Gere; Terrence Howard; Hugh Jackman; Johnny Knoxville; Justin Long; Christopher Mintz-Plasse; Chloë Grace Moretz; Liev Schreiber; Seann William Scott; Emma Stone; Jason Sudeikis; Uma Thurman; Naomi Watts; Kate Winslet
- Cinematography: Frank G. DeMarco; Steve Gainer; Matthew F. Leonetti; Daryn Okada; William Rexer; Mattias Rudh; Eric Scherbarth; Newton Thomas Sigel; Tim Suhrstedt
- Edited by: Debra Chiate; Patrick J. Don Vito; Suzy Elmiger; Mark Helfrich; Craig Herring; Myron Kerstein; Jonathan van Tulleken; Joe Randall-Cutler; Sam Seig; Michael P. Shawver; Cara Silverman; Sandy Solowitz; Håkan Wärn; Paul Zucker
- Music by: Christophe Beck; David J. Hodge; Leo Birenberg; Tyler Bates; Miles Moon; William Goodrum
- Production companies: Rogue; Virgin Produced; GreeneStreet Films; Charles B. Wessler Entertainment
- Distributed by: Relativity Media
- Release date: January 25, 2013
- Running time: 94 minutes
- Country: United States
- Language: English
- Budget: $6 million
- Box office: $32.4 million

Movie 43 is a 2013 American sketch comedy film conceived by producer Charles B. Wessler. Featuring fourteen different storylines, each by a different director, including Elizabeth Banks, Steven Brill, Steve Carr, Rusty Cundieff, James Duffy, Griffin Dunne, Patrik Forsberg, James Gunn, Bob Odenkirk, Brett Ratner, Will Graham, and Jonathan van Tulleken; the film stars an ensemble cast led by Banks, Kristen Bell, Halle Berry, Leslie Bibb, Kate Bosworth, Gerard Butler, Josh Duhamel, Anna Faris, Richard Gere, Terrence Howard, Hugh Jackman, Johnny Knoxville, Justin Long, Christopher Mintz-Plasse, Chloë Grace Moretz, Liev Schreiber, Seann William Scott, Emma Stone, Jason Sudeikis, Uma Thurman, Naomi Watts, and Kate Winslet.

The project took almost a decade to get into production, and was eventually picked up by Relativity Media for $6 million. Filming took place over a period of several years, as casting also proved to be a challenge. Some, including George Clooney, declined to participate, while others, such as Gere, attempted to get out of the project.

Released on January 25, 2013, after having been originally slated for release on April 13, 2012, Movie 43 was panned by critics. Although it was a modest commercial success, grossing $32.4 million against a budget of $6 million, it is considered one of the worst films of all time, the film received three awards at the 34th Golden Raspberry Awards, including Worst Picture.

== Plot ==
Movie 43 is a series of different, interconnected short films and sketches containing different scenes and scenarios about a washed-up producer as he pitches insane story lines featuring some of the biggest stars in Hollywood.

=== The Pitch ===
- Produced and directed by Peter Farrelly and written by Rocky Russo, Jeremy Sosenko, and Ricky Blitt

The film is composed of multiple comedy shorts presented through an overarching segment titled "The Pitch", in which Charlie Wessler, a mad screenwriter, is attempting to pitch a script to film executive Griffin Schraeder.

After revealing several of the stories in his script, Wessler becomes agitated when Schraeder dismisses his outrageous ideas, and he pulls a gun on him and forces him to listen to multiple other stories before making Schraeder consult his manager, Bob Mone, to purchase the film.

When they do so, Mone's condescending, humiliating attitude toward Schraeder angers him to the point that, after agreeing to make the film "the biggest film since Howard the Duck", he confronts Mone in the parking lot with a gun and tries to make him perform fellatio on the security guard (Wessler had gotten on the lot by doing the same thing) and kill him if he does not make the film.

Wessler tries to calm Schraeder down with more story ideas to no avail, but Mone pulls out a gun and shoots Schraeder to death. As the segment ends, it is revealed that it is being shot by a camera crew as part of the movie, leading into the final segments.

Cast

- Dennis Quaid as Charlie Wessler
- Greg Kinnear as Griffin Schraeder
- Common as Bob Mone
- Charlie Saxton as Jay
- Will Sasso as Jerry
- Odessa Rae as Danita
- Seth MacFarlane as Himself
- Mike Meldman as Himself

=== Alternative version (The Thread) ===
- Directed by Steven Brill and written by Rocky Russo and Jeremy Sosenko

In some countries, like the United Kingdom and the Netherlands, the structure differs. Instead of a pitch, the films are connected by a group of three teenagers searching for the most banned film in the world, Movie 43, which will ultimately lead to the destruction of civilization. Calvin Cutler and his friend J. J. make a video in the style of MTV's Jackass and upload it on YouTube where it instantly reaches over 1,000,000 views. This turns out to be an April Fool's prank from Calvin's younger brother Baxter, who cloned YouTube and hyper-inflated the views while working on his science project.

Calvin and J.J. attempt to get revenge by telling Baxter of a film that's so dangerous it will cause the annihilation of the world. The movie is known as Movie 43. While J.J. and Baxter look for Movie 43 on a Google stand-in, Calvin retrieves Baxter's laptop and loads it with viruses from porn sites, and masturbates to a strip tease video on the porn sites in a bathroom. Baxter finds hundreds of results for Movie 43 on a website referred to by him as a dark corner of the Internet. They find the sketches starting from the 43rd search on the list of results.

As Baxter and J.J. keep watching videos, they are interrupted by Vrankovich and a group of Chinese mobsters wanting to find Movie 43, going so far as to take J.J.'s classmate Stevie Schraeder, film executive Griffin Schraeder's oldest son, hostage. Vrankovich warns them that if they find Movie 43, civilization will be destroyed. They ignore his claims and keep searching, eventually finding the real, Movie 43, which turns out to be from the future, and which shows Baxter as a profane commando, leading a group of recruits to survive after the world has ended.

As Calvin finishes ruining Baxter's laptop, their mother enters, wearing the same shirt and shorts that the woman in the strip tease video wore, causing Calvin to have a mental breakdown, realizing he masturbated to a video of his mother. Afterward, a deadly earthquake rumbles and mankind is lost. However, a few years later the only survivor, a crippled Calvin, finds Baxter's laptop still working despite the viruses. He watches the last remaining skits on the laptop.

This version of the film was released in the U.S. as part of the Blu-ray Disc of Movie 43 as an unrated alternate cut of the film, and it is the only version of the film streaming on Amazon Prime in the U.S.

Cast

- Mark L. Young as Calvin Cutler
- Adam Cagley as J.J.
- Devin Eash as Baxter Cutler
- Fisher Stevens as Vrankovich / Minotaur
- Tim Chou as Chinese Gangster #1
- James Hsu as Chinese Gangster #2
- Nate Hartley as Stevie Schraeder
- Liz Carey as Sitara
- Beth Littleford as Mrs. Cutler

=== Segments ===
==== The Catch ====
- Produced and directed by Peter Farrelly, written by Bill O'Malley, Rocky Russo, and Jeremy Sosenko

Single businesswoman Beth goes on a blind date with Davis, the city's most eligible bachelor. When they arrive together at a restaurant, Beth is shocked when he removes his scarf, revealing a pair of testicles dangling from his neck. Over dinner, it confuses her that he fails to acknowledge his anatomical abnormality, and nobody seems to be surprised by it. When two friends of Davis come by, one of them convinces him to give Beth a kiss. Davis agrees, but when he kisses her on the forehead, his neck testicles are dangling near Beth's mouth, causing her to scream and break off the kiss.

Cast

- Hugh Jackman as Davis
- Kate Winslet as Beth
- Roy Jenkins as Ray
- Rocky Russo as Jake, The Waiter
- Anna Madigan as Abby
- Julie Claire as Pam
- Katie Finneran as Angie

==== Homeschooled ====
- Directed by Will Graham, written by Will Graham & Jack Kukoda

Recently moved in, Sean and Clare have coffee with their new neighbors, Robert and Samantha who have a teenage son, Kevin, whom they home-school. They begin inquiring about the homeschooling, and Robert and Samantha describe how they replicated a full high school experience, going as far as hazing, bullying, ostracizing, and giving out detentions.

To make the experience as awkward as possible, like "real high school," they threw parties that excluded Kevin, Samantha instigated Kevin's "first kiss" and Robert revealed romantic feelings for Kevin. Visibly disturbed, the neighbors end up meeting Kevin, who says he is going out and gives them the impression that all is fine: until he reveals a doll made of a mop with Samantha's face on it, referring to the doll as his girlfriend.

Cast

- Jeremy Allen White as Kevin Miller
- Liev Schreiber as Robert Miller
- Naomi Watts as Samantha Miller
- Alex Cranmer as Sean
- Julie Ann Emery as Clare

==== The Proposition ====
- Directed by Steve Carr, written by Rocky Russo & Jeremy Sosenko

Julie and Doug have been in a relationship for a year. When he attempts to propose, she reveals that she is a coprophiliac, asking him to defecate on her in the bedroom. Urged by his best friend Larry and others to go along with it, he eats a large meal and drinks a bottle of laxative prior to the event.

Wanting foreplay, Julie is angered when Doug wants to finish, and she runs into the street. Chasing after her, he is then hit by a car and graphically evacuates his bowels everywhere. She cradles him and apologizes; covered and surrounded by his excrement on the road, she exclaims that it is the "most beautiful thing" she has ever seen and accepts his marriage proposal.

Cast

- Anna Faris as Julie / Vanessa
- Chris Pratt as Doug / Jason
- J. B. Smoove as Larry
- Jarrad Paul as Bill
- Maria Arcé as Christine
- Aaron LaPlante as Friend

==== Veronica ====
- Directed by Griffin Dunne, written by Matthew Alec Portenoy

Neil is working the night shift at a local grocery store when his ex-girlfriend Veronica comes through his line and they begin arguing. Soon it turns into sexual discussion and flirtation as they lament over their relationship. Unbeknownst to them, Neil's intercom microphone broadcasts the entire explicit conversation throughout the store, where various elderly people and vagrants tune in. After she leaves in tears, the customers agree to cover his shift while he goes after her.

Cast

- Kieran Culkin as Neil
- Emma Stone as Veronica
- Arthur French as Old Man
- Brooke Davis as Tall lady
- Josh Shuman as Short Man

==== iBabe ====
- Directed by Steven Brill, written by Claes Kjellstrom & Jonas Wittenmark & Tobias Carlson and Rocky Russo & Jeremy Sosenko

A developing company is having a meeting in their headquarters over their newly released product, the "iBabe", a life-sized, realistic replica of a nude woman which functions as an MP3 player. The boss listens to his various workers argue over the placement of a fan that was built into the genital region of the iBabe, which is cutting off the penises of teenage boys who attempt to have sex with them. The board members then agree to strongly emphasize the dangers of the product via its new commercials.

Cast

- Richard Gere as Boss
- Kate Bosworth as Arlene
- Jack McBrayer as Brian
- Aasif Mandvi as Robert
- Darby Lynn Totten as Woman
- Marc Ambrose as "Chappy"
- Cathy Cliften as iBabe #1
- Cherina Monteniques Scott as iBabe #2
- Zach Lasry as Boy

==== Super Hero Speed Dating ====
- Co-edited and directed by James Duffy and written by Will Carlough

Robin and his cohort Batman are in Gotham City at a speed dating event seeking out a bomb threat by their nemesis Penguin. While Robin attempts to connect with various women through speed dating including Stacey, Lois Lane, and Supergirl, Batman encounters his ex Wonder Woman and attempts to stop Penguin from detonating Supergirl, who later turns out to be the Riddler in disguise, which Batman already knew and was screwing with Robin, who kissed "her" moments before Batman exposed the Riddler's ruse. Lois Lane tells Robin on their speed date that six months ago she broke up with Superman, who turns out to be a stalker/sexual predator by ejaculating on her bedroom window. Further playing with the popular discussion of Superman's sperm, like in the film Mallrats, Lois Lane reveals that he uses his semen as a hair gel to keep the spit curl consistent.

Cast

- Justin Long as Dick Grayson / Robin
- Jason Sudeikis as Bruce Wayne / Batman
- Uma Thurman as Lois Lane
- Bobby Cannavale as Clark Kent / Superman
- Kristen Bell as Kara / Supergirl
- John Hodgman as The Penguin
- Leslie Bibb as Diana Prince / Wonder Woman
- Will Carlough as Riddler
- Katrina Bowden as Stacey

==== Machine Kids ====
- Written, co-edited, and directed by Jonathan van Tulleken

A faux-Public service announcement about children stuck in machines and how adults' criticism of these particular machines affects the feelings of the children stuck inside them. This commercial was paid for by the "Society for the Prevention of Cruelty to Children Inside Machines".

==== Middle School Date ====
- Directed by Elizabeth Banks, written by Elizabeth Wright Shapiro

Nathan and Amanda are watching television after school at his house as their first "middle school" date. When they begin to kiss, his older brother Mikey enters the living room and makes fun of them. Amanda then discovers she is menstruating and tries to hide it. When Nathan sees blood on her pants, he panics and believes her to be bleeding to death. He causes a debacle, later including Nathan and Mikey's father Steve and Amanda's father.

Amanda calls them out on their stupidity, embarrassed to know that she's getting her first period in front of them and they don't know what to do about it. When she leaves with her father, Nathan yells that the process of keeping the lining of her internal organs intact by inserting his erect phallus into her vagina is much too complicated and Mikey agrees. Steve cheers them up by farting in front of them. As Mikey goes to the bathroom, Nathan and Steve watch a game on television, which has a very graphic Tampax commercial in which a girl gets eaten by a shark due to her menstruating.

Cast

- Christopher Mintz-Plasse as Mikey
- Chloë Grace Moretz as Amanda
- Jimmy Bennett as Nathan
- Patrick Warburton as Steve, Nathan and Mikey's Father
- Matt Walsh as Amanda's Father

==== Happy Birthday ====
- Directed by Brett Ratner, written by Jacob Fleisher

Pete captures a leprechaun for his roommate, Brian, as a birthday present. Tying the leprechaun up in the basement, they demand he gives them a pot of gold. The obscene leprechaun threatens that his brother is coming to save him. When he arrives, Brian and Pete are shot at but ultimately kill both leprechauns. At the end of the segment, Pete reveals he has also caught a fairy who performs fellatio for gold coins.

Cast

- Gerard Butler as Leprechaun #1 / Leprechaun #2
- Johnny Knoxville as Pete
- Seann William Scott as Brian
- Esti Ginzburg as Storybook Fairy

==== Truth or Dare ====
- Produced and directed by Peter Farrelly, written by Greg Pritikin

Donald and Emily are on a date together at a Mexican restaurant. Tired of typical first dates, Emily challenges Donald to a game of truth or dare. She dares him to grab a man's buttocks, and he follows by daring her to blow out the birthday candles on a blind boy's cake. The game rapidly escalates to extremes, in which both of them get plastic surgery and obscene tattoos, continuing to humiliate themselves.

When Donald and Emily arrive back at Emily's apartment, they praise their date. Donald tries to kiss her, but she rejects him, claiming she's not attracted to Asian men (which he was surgically altered to resemble). However, she calls him back to her, admitting she was joking and invites him to have sex with her as she flaunts her newly enlarged breasts.

Cast

- Halle Berry as Emily
- Stephen Merchant as Donald
- Sayed Badreya as Large Man
- Snooki as Herself
- Caryl West as Waitress
- Ricki Noel Lander as Nurse Elizabeth
- Paloma Felisberto as Bachelorette Party Girl
- Jasper Grey as Patron
- Benny Harris as Blanco, The Bartender
- Zen Gesner as Stripper

==== Victory's Glory ====
- Directed by Rusty Cundieff, written by Rocky Russo & Jeremy Sosenko

Set in 1959, Coach Jackson is lecturing his all-black basketball team before their first game against an all-white team. Worried about losing the game, the timid players are lectured by the coach about their superiority in the sport over their white counterparts, which he expresses vulgarly. When the game ensues, the all-white team loses miserably yet rejoices in a single point they earn.

Cast

- Terrence Howard as Coach Jackson
- Aaron Jennings as Anthony
- Corey Brewer as Wallace
- Jared Dudley as Moses
- Larry Sanders as Bishop
- Jay Ellis as Lucious
- Brian Flaccus as White Guy #1
- Brett Davern as White Guy #2
- Evan Dumouchel as White Guy #3
- Sean Rosales as White Guy #4
- Logan Holladay as White Guy #5
- Mandy Kowalski as Cheerleader
- Eric Stuart as The Narrator

==== Beezel ====
- Written and directed by James Gunn

Played mid-credits, Amy worries that her boyfriend Anson's animated cat Beezel is coming between them. Beezel seems to detest Amy and anyone who comes between him and Anson, but he only sees Beezel as innocent. One day, Amy witnesses Beezel masturbating to summer vacation photos of Anson in a swimsuit. He attacks and violently urinates on her.

Anson still finds his pet innocent but Amy threatens to leave if he doesn't get rid of Beezel. Caring more about his relationship, he agrees to find a new home for him. That night, from a closet, Beezel tearfully watches the couple make love (whilst sodomizing himself with a hairbrush and dry humping a stuffed teddy bear).

The next day when it comes time to take Beezel away, he is nowhere to be found. Amy goes outside to look. Beezel then runs her over with a truck and attempts to kill her with a shotgun, but she chases him into the street and begins beating him with a shovel, which is witnessed by a group of children attending a birthday party at a neighboring house.

When Anson approaches to see what is happening, Amy tries to explain Beezel's motives. He acts innocent and Anson sides with his cat. The children of the party then attack and murder Amy for beating up Beezel, stabbing her with plastic forks. Anson grabs him, as Beezel again fantasizes about French kissing his owner.

Cast

- Elizabeth Banks as Amy
- Josh Duhamel as Anson
- Emily Alyn Lind as Birthday Girl
- Michelle Gunn as Mommy
- Christina Linhardt as Party Clown

==== Find Our Daughter ====
- Written and directed by Bob Odenkirk

In this deleted segment, Maude and George are looking for their breast-flashing daughter Susie with the help of a private eye, who is behind the camera with only one clue, a small video that features their daughter. The scene was included as an extra on the DVD and Blu-ray release.

Cast

- Julianne Moore as Maude
- Tony Shalhoub as George
- Jordanna Taylor as Susie
- Bob Odenkirk as Private Investigator

==== The Apprentice ====
- Written and directed by Steve Baker and Damon Escott

The second deleted segment follows a shy apprentice mortician named Wayne, who is secretly a necrophiliac. One night, a body he's having sex with is brought back to life from the pressure of his thrusts. His supervisor Bob suddenly walks in and believes Wayne has performed a life-saving operation of some kind. The staff at the hospital and the media congratulate him while a news reporter asks what he did to save her.

Unable to conjure an answer, one of the cops on scene tells everyone else they can just watch the security tapes to find out. As they rush to the security room, Wayne is given a personal thanks by the girl he revived, upon which he responds with an awkward "You're welcome". Unlike Find Our Daughter, this segment was not included in the home release, and instead premiered at the 2014 LA Comedy Festival.

Cast

- Anton Yelchin as Wayne
- Shane Jacobson as Bob
- Maria Volk as Girl
- Christopher Kirby as Cop

== Production ==
=== Development ===
Charles B. Wessler first came up with the idea for an outrageous comedy made up of several short films in the early 2000s. "It's like Funny or Die, only if you could go crazy," judged Farrelly, "because with Funny or Die, there are certain limits. And we just wanted to do that kind of short and go much further than that." Charlie Wessler affirmed that he "wanted to make a Kentucky Fried Movie for the modern age".

Wessler then recruited three pairs of directors—Trey Parker and Matt Stone, Peter and Bobby Farrelly, and David and Jerry Zucker—to sign on to write and direct one-third of the project each. He then began working out a deal with a studio for the project, but the project did not stick. "They ended up calling me about a month after we started negotiating the deal and said 'we can't do it' because they had political pressure to not make R-rated movies that were marketed to teenagers," claimed Wessler. He then went to multiple other studios, but, according to Wessler, "no one could understand what I was trying to do".

In 2009, Peter Farrelly and producer John Penotti took their pitch—along with about 60 scripts for the vignettes—to Relativity Media. At that meeting, Wessler, Penotti, and Farrelly presented one short that they already had shot, starring Kate Winslet as a woman going on a blind date with a seemingly successful and handsome Hugh Jackman. "They just looked at me and said, 'Go for it,'" Wessler told The Hollywood Reporter. "It takes a lot of balls to make something that is not conventional." Relativity provided $6 million for the film, but no other studio would sign on. "Other potential backers", Farrelly revealed, "didn't believe it could happen—a movie with Kate Winslet for $6 million?"

The film officially began principal photography in March 2010, but due to its large cast, producer/director Farrelly told Entertainment Weekly that "This movie was made over four years, and they just had to wait for a year or two years for different actors. They would shoot for a week, and shut down for several months. Same thing with the directors. It was the type of movie you could come back to." Shortly before shooting, writers Parker, Stone, and the Zuckers backed out.

The film ended up with thirteen directors and nineteen writers tied to it, each one co-writing and directing different segments of the sixteen different storylines. Farrelly directed the parts of the movie with Halle Berry and Kate Winslet.

=== Casting and filming ===
Wessler spent years recruiting actors for the film. Many turned down the project. "Most agents would avoid me because they knew what I wanted to do—what agent wants to book their big client in a no pay, $800-a-day, two-day shoot?" he said. "The truth is, I had a lot of friends who were in this movie. And if they didn't say yes, this movie wouldn't have gotten made." In the end, most of the actors were willing to take part because the film only required a few days of their time and often allowed them to play a character outside of their wheelhouse.

According to Dennis Quaid in a 2024 interview on the Howie Mandel Does Stuff podcast while promoting Reagan and The Substance as he reflected on his Hollywood career, he debunked long-standing Hollywood rumors that the film's ensemble cast was tricked or misled into signing on to do Movie 43. Quaid stated that he had read the script beforehand and knew exactly what the project entailed, noting that his primary motivation for joining the film was the opportunity to work with co-director Peter Farrelly. Quaid's segment—where he plays an unhinged screenwriter pitching ideas at gunpoint—was part of a late-stage revision; filmmakers originally shot a framing device involving teenagers searching for a banned movie on the internet, but later replaced it with Quaid's storyline for the film's US theatrical release while the teenagers subplot was kept in the UK and international versions.Mandel, Howie (September 1, 2026). Dennis Quaid Loved Making Movie 43. YouTube. Howie Mandel.</ref>

Hugh Jackman was the first actor Wessler cast. He met the star at a wedding and then called him sometime later and pitched him the short. Jackman read the script and agreed to be a part of the film. "He called me back I think 24 hours later and said, 'Yeah I wanna do this,' which I think is, quite frankly, incredibly ballsy. Because you could be made a fool of, or you could look silly, and there will be people who say, 'That's crazy; he should never have done it.'"

After talking to the multiple agents of Kate Winslet, she eventually agreed to take part. The Winslet-Jackman sketch was shot shortly after and became the reel to attract other A-list stars.

John Hodgman, who plays opposite Justin Long in one sketch, signed on with no knowledge of the project. Long, Hodgman's co-star in the long-running Get a Mac series of Apple commercials, asked him to do the project, and he then signed on, without still knowing too much. Hodgman said, "I got an e-mail from Justin that said, 'I'm going to be dressing up as Robin again. Do you want to dress up as the Penguin?' And I said yes. Without even realizing cameras would be involved, or that it would be a movie."

James Gunn revealed during a Facebook Q&A that he was convinced to do the film by Elizabeth Banks and to "blame her" for it. He added, "I didn't even get to edit that stupid thing!" He also has never seen the film.

Richard Gere, a friend of Wessler's, agreed to appear in the film, but said that he would not be available for over a year. Gere later contacted Wessler, saying he was available to shoot the film, but on the condition that they do it in four days and relocate the shoot from Los Angeles to New York City.

"They clearly wanted out!" judged Farrelly. "But we wouldn't let them. The strategy was simple: Wait for them. Shoot when they want to shoot. Guilt them to death." Colin Farrell initially agreed to be in the Butler leprechaun sketch—as Butler's brother, also a leprechaun—but then he backed out and Gerard Butler did the sketch by himself. Farrelly said that when he approached George Clooney about playing himself in a sketch (the gag was that Clooney is bad at picking up women), Clooney told him "No fucking way." There were two sketches cut from the film that were originally shown during a test screening; one that starred Anton Yelchin as a necrophiliac mortician who worked at a hospital and had sex with the dead female bodies, and another starring Julianne Moore and Tony Shalhoub as a married couple being interviewed by a detective about their missing daughter. Producer Penotti said that the sketches would be seen on the DVD and Blu-ray Disc releases of the film, however only the latter was included in the release.

Because the filmmakers worked around the stars' schedules, the filming of the whole movie took several years. While so many A-list actors were on board, most were not completely aware of what other sketches would be included in the film, which features thirteen vignettes tied together by a story of a mad screenwriter (Quaid) pitching ideas to a movie producer (Kinnear). Penotti said many of the actors did not ask many questions about what else was going on in the film. "They were attracted to their script, and as long as that tickled their funnybone, that was enough," he revealed.

== Promotion ==
The title of the film, Movie 43 has no meaning. Farrelly heard his son talking with friends about a film called "Movie 43", but when Farrelly discovered the film did not exist, he cribbed the name.

Relativity did little to promote the film and none of the cast members did any promotion of the film. The film was not screened for critics in advance. "The slapdash title, the lack of promotion and advance screenings, the release date—none of it bodes well," opined Entertainment Weekly senior editor Thom Geier. "January is usually where movies go to die," Geier argued. "And to go by the trailer—the only option—the content seems dated." A red-band trailer was released on October 3, 2012. Farrelly was optimistic: "Kids, teenagers, 50-somethings who still smoke pot—they're all going to find something here," he asserted.

== Reception ==
=== Critical response ===
Movie 43 was universally panned by critics, with some considering it to be one of the worst films ever made. On the review aggregator website Rotten Tomatoes, 5% of 87 critics' reviews are positive, with an average rating of 2.7/10. The website's consensus reads: "A star-studded turkey, Movie 43 is loaded with gleefully offensive and often scatological gags, but it's largely bereft of laughs." Metacritic, which uses a weighted average, assigned the film a score of 18 out of 100, based on 23 critics, indicating "overwhelming dislike". Audiences surveyed by CinemaScore gave the film a D rating.

Brian Gibson (Vue Weekly) describes Movie 43 as "An execrable waste cooked up by a hell's kitchen of directors and writers. It's death-of-laughter by committee. Its title? Because it's like one of those many asteroids out there—a dismal chunk of rock hurtling through an empty void, without purpose." IGN's Gregg Katzman gave the film a 1/10, with the main criticisms being its unfunny jokes and the waste of its all-star cast, with the only positive being its sub two hour running time. It would go on to tie with Scary Movie 5 for IGN's worst movie of 2013. In his guest review for Roger Ebert's website, Richard Roeper of the Chicago Sun-Times outright panned the film, giving it zero out of four stars, calling it "aggressively tasteless", and going so far as to say "Movie 43 is the Citizen Kane of awful". He wrote that the film has nothing in common with The Groove Tube and The Kentucky Fried Movie, two "very funny and influential" sketch-comedy films. He additionally criticized Movie 43 for what he calls "female humiliation", saying that although the men are "jerks, idiots, dolts and fools", the women have it even worse. Robbie Collin of The Daily Telegraph gave the film 1/5 stars, describing it as "the work of a confused man thrashing around in an industry he no longer understands". Peter Howell of the Toronto Star gave the film zero out of four stars and called it the worst film he had ever seen. Elizabeth Weitzman of the New York Daily News gave it a negative review, saying, "As a film critic, I've seen nearly 4,000 movies over the last fifteen years. Right now, I can't think of one worse than Movie 43."

In one of the few positive reviews, Michael O'Sullivan of The Washington Post gave the film three and a half out of four stars, calling it "a near masterpiece of tastelessness". Alonso Duralde of TheWrap said that the film was "gross, juvenile, disgusting, scatological, vile, reprehensible and in the worst possible taste. But heaven help me, I laughed."

=== Box office ===
Movie 43 was predicted to debut to less than $10 million, with the studio expecting $8–9 million. It took in $1,810,561 on its opening Friday, far below expectations.

The opening weekend total came to $4,805,878, opening in seventh place. At the end of its run, closing in the United States on March 14, 2013, the film had grossed $8,840,453 domestically and $23,598,535 internationally for a worldwide total of $32,438,988.

Relativity stated that they had already covered all costs with international pre-sales deals and a deal with Netflix.

=== Awards and nominations ===
Year	Association	Category	Nominee(s)	Result	Ref.
2013	Golden Trailer Awards	Trashiest Trailer	"Unsee it" trailer	Nominated	
2014	Golden Raspberry Awards	Worst Picture	All the filmmakers	Won	
2014	Golden Raspberry Awards	Worst Director	The 10 of 13 directors	Won	
2014	Golden Raspberry Awards	Worst Actress	Halle Berry (also for The Call)	Nominated	
2014	Golden Raspberry Awards	Worst Actress	Naomi Watts (also for Diana)	Nominated	
2014	Golden Raspberry Awards	Worst Screenplay	All the screenwriters	Won	
2014	Golden Raspberry Awards	Worst Screen Combo	The entire cast	Nominated	

=== Home media ===
Movie 43 was released on DVD and Blu-ray on June 18, 2013.

== See also ==
- List of films considered the worst
- List of films shot over three or more years
