= Boisfeuillet Jones Jr. =

American newspaper executive (born 1946)

Boisfeuillet "Bo" Jones Jr. (/ˈboʊfəleɪ/ BOH-fə-lay; born 1946) was president and chief executive officer of MacNeil/Lehrer Productions in Arlington, Virginia. He was former vice chairman of The Washington Post Company and Chairman of The Washington Post board from 2008 until December 31, 2011. From 2000 to 2008 he was publisher and chief executive officer of The Washington Post.

== Early life ==
Jones was born in Atlanta in 1946 to Boisfeuillet Jones Sr., a philanthropist, and Laura Coit Jones. Anne Baynon Register Jones became his step-mother following the death of his mother and the marriage of his father to Anne Register. Jones went to high school at St. Albans School in Washington, D.C., and later received an A.B. in 1968 from Harvard College, where he was president of The Harvard Crimson and a member of the Spee Club. At both St. Albans and Harvard he was two years behind Donald E. Graham, his future employer. He attended Exeter College, Oxford University as a Rhodes Scholar and received a D.Phil. in modern history. He received his J.D. in 1974 from Harvard Law School, where he was an editor of the Harvard Law Review.

== Early career ==
Prior to joining The Post, Jones was an attorney with Hill and Barlow in Boston from 1975 to 1980, and was law clerk for judge Levin H. Campbell of the United States Court of Appeals for the First Circuit, from 1974 to 1975.

== The Washington Post ==
Jones joined the Post in 1980 as vice president and counsel. In 1995, he became president and general manager of the Post, assuming responsibility for the business side of the newspaper. In January 2000, he was named associate publisher, assuming responsibility of the Post on a day-to-day basis. In September 2000 he became publisher and CEO.

He is a director of the Associated Press, the Newspaper Association of America, the Eugene and Agnes E. Meyer Foundation, and the Federal City Council.

Media offices
Preceded by Donald E. Graham	Publisher of "The Washington Post"; 2000 - 2008	Succeeded by Katharine Weymouth
