= Accountable autonomy =

Accountable autonomy is an institutional design of administrative and democratic organization that tries to maximize civic participation and deliberation. Political scientist Archon Fung coined the term. Accountable autonomy addresses the defects of decentralization and localism, such as group-think, inequality, and parochialism, through hybrid arrangements that allocate political power, function and responsibility between central authorities and local bodies. The terms “accountable” and “autonomy” might seem at odds. Autonomy means independence from central power and the capacity to accomplish its ends. The second sense is what Fung stresses: ‘a conception of centralized action that counter-intuitively bolsters local capability without improperly and destructively encroaching upon it.’

Two examples of this agency structure are Chicago's Alternative Policing Strategy and Local School Councils.

== Design ==
The design of accountable autonomy exists in prescriptions for the efficacy of civic participation:

1. Increasing discretion of street-level officials with respect to formal rules and centralized oversight, while making their actions transparent and open to critique for civilians;
2. Generating innovations through engaging the local knowledge of civilians and diffusing insights through benchmarking of best practices;
3. Having cross-functional coordination, not a rigid division of labor;
4. Enhancing neighbourhood trust through tests of collaboration.

Fung argues that accountable autonomy increases fairness, because it offers ways for the least advantaged to act constructively against unfairness and it offers opportunities for civilians to deliberate about prioritization of problems and strategies to solve them.

== See also ==
- Subsidiarity
