= Donald E. Graham =

Chairman of Graham Holdings Company (born 1945)

- Born: April 22, 1945 (age 81); Baltimore, Maryland, U.S.
- Education: Harvard University (AB)
- Occupations: Chairman, Graham Holdings Company
- Spouses: Mary Wissler (m. 1967; div. 2007) Amanda Bennett (m. 2012)
- Children: 4
- Parent(s): Phil Graham; Katharine Graham
- Relatives: Lally Weymouth (sister); Eugene Meyer (grandfather); Ernest R. Graham (grandfather); Bob Graham (uncle); Florence Meyer (aunt); Gwen Graham (cousin); Joseph Newmark (great great-grandfather)

Donald Edward Graham (born April 22, 1945) is an American publisher and businessman who is the majority owner and chairman of Graham Holdings Company. He was formerly the publisher of The Washington Post (1979–2000) and later was the lead independent director of Facebook's board of directors (2009–2015).

== Early life ==
His parents were Katharine Graham (née Meyer), later a publisher of The Washington Post, and her husband, Philip Graham. His maternal grandmother was Agnes Meyer. His maternal grandfather, Eugene Meyer, bought the bankrupt Post shortly after stepping down as Chairman of the Federal Reserve in mid-1933. Graham's mother Katherine Meyer was baptized as Lutheran as a child, as her mother was Lutheran. Her father was Jewish. Katherine (Meyer) Graham later attended an Episcopal church. His father Philip Graham was also raised as a Lutheran.

Graham graduated from the private St. Albans School. He attended Harvard College. In 1965, he was elected president of The Harvard Crimson, the college's daily newspaper.

After graduation in 1966, Graham volunteered for military service. He served in the Vietnam War from 1967 to 1968, as part of the United States Army 1st Cavalry Division. From January 1969 to June 1970, Graham joined the Metropolitan Police Department of the District of Columbia as a patrolman.

== The Post ==
Eugene Meyer, Graham's maternal grandfather, bought The Washington Post at a bankruptcy sale in 1933. Graham's father Philip was publisher of The Washington Post from 1946 until 1961, and president of the Washington Post Company from 1947 until his death in 1963. Graham’s mother Katharine took over the newspaper as publisher after her husband's death. She led The Washington Post newspaper for more than two decades, overseeing its most famous period, the Watergate coverage that helped expose misdeeds of President Richard Nixon, who was persuaded to resign. She has been widely described as one of the most powerful American women of the 20th century.

In 1971, Donald Graham joined The Washington Post as a reporter. He held a variety of news and business positions at the Post and Newsweek (until 2010, it was owned by The Washington Post Company), until the newspaper was sold in 2013 to Jeff Bezos.

Graham was elected to the board of the company in September 1974; in 1976 he was appointed as executive vice president and general manager of the Post. Graham became publisher of The Washington Post in 1979, succeeding his mother. She retained her corporate positions of chairman of the board and CEO of The Washington Post Company. The Company owns the newspaper, as well as the educational services provider Kaplan, Inc., Post-Newsweek Stations, Cable One, Slate magazine, and other smaller companies. Donald Graham became CEO in 1991 and chairman of the company in May 1993, while Katharine Graham assumed the position of chairman of the executive committee of the Washington Post Company.

In September 2000, Graham was elected chairman of the newspaper and passed the position of publisher to Boisfeuillet Jones, Jr. Graham and Jones attended both St. Albans and Harvard together.

== Other roles ==
Graham also served as a member of the Pulitzer Prize Board between 2001 and 2010. He is on the board of the District of Columbia College Access Program and is a trustee of the Federal City Council in Washington, D.C. Graham formerly served as a member of the board of directors of the Summit Fund of Washington.

He is also an invitee of the Bilderberg Group and attended conference meetings in Greece 2009, and Spain 2010.

== Honors ==
In 1974, Graham was awarded an honorary doctorate from Whittier College. In 2003, Graham received the Golden Plate Award of the American Academy of Achievement. He was elected to the American Philosophical Society in 2004.

== Personal life ==
In 1967, Graham married Mary Wissler. Wissler earned a bachelor's degree from Harvard-Radcliffe, where they met, and a J.D. degree from Georgetown University Law Center. She is a research fellow at the Harvard Kennedy School's Taubman Center, focusing on such issues as health and safety regulations. In 2007, the couple announced that they were separating. They have four children.

On June 30, 2012, Graham married Amanda Bennett, the former CEO of U.S. Agency for Global Media under Joe Biden. She formerly edited The Philadelphia Inquirer and the Lexington Herald-Leader, was the former director of Voice of America, and former executive editor at Bloomberg News. She was in charge of a global team of investigative reporters and editors.

His daughter Laura is married to Tim O'Shaughnessy, former CEO of LivingSocial. He is current president of Graham Holdings Company.

== See also ==
- Andrew Rosen

Media offices
Preceded by Katharine Graham	Publisher of "The Washington Post"; 1979 - 2000	Succeeded by Boisfeuillet Jones Jr.
