= Archon Fung =

American political scientist

- Born: 6 April 1968 (age 58)

Academic background
- Education: MIT

Academic work
- Discipline: Transparency in public and private governance, participatory democracy
- Institutions: Harvard University
- Awards: National Science Foundation Training Fellowship in Democratization
- Website: Official website

Archon Fung (born 6 April 1968) is the Winthrop Laflin McCormack Professor of Citizenship and Democracy at Harvard University's Kennedy School of Government and co-founder of the Transparency Policy Project. Fung served as an assistant professor of public policy at the Kennedy School from July 1999–June 2004, then as an associate professor of public policy at the Kennedy School from July 2004–October 2007, and finally as a professor of public policy from October 2007–March 2009 before being named as the Ford Foundation Chair of Democracy and Citizenship in March 2009. In 2015, he was elected to the Common Cause National Governing Board.

Fung has authored five books, three edited collections, and over fifty articles appearing in journals including American Political Science Review, Public Administration Review, Political Theory, Journal of Political Philosophy, Politics and Society, Governance, Journal of Policy and Management, Environmental Management, American Behavioral Scientist, International Journal of Urban and Regional Research, and Boston Review.

== Education ==
Fung received his undergraduate and graduate education at MIT, where he gained two Bachelor of Science degrees in Philosophy and Physics in 1990 and a Ph.D. in political science in 1999.

== Major works ==
Fung's dissertation looked at the impact of the participatory involvement of Chicago's residents, police officers, teachers, and community groups to reform education. This research was published in Fung's first book Empowered Participation: Reinventing Urban Democracy in 2004. The book details Fung's concept of accountable autonomy.

Fung's research took an in-depth approach understanding local governance as both an examination of a specific case but also as a model for understanding urban participatory democracy. A review of Empowered Participation in the journal Environment and Planning C noted its "rigorous theoretical framework" but called it "marked by some contestable normative and political assumptions" and said: "From an empirical perspective Fung's qualitative approach remains insufficiently explored."

Fung's second book Full Disclosure: The Perils and Promise of Transparency was co-authored with Mary Graham and David Weil in 2007. Full Disclosure examines transparency as a regulatory tool for protecting the public interest through the lens of eighteen major policies, including those designed to improve car safety and restaurant hygiene. This work introduces the notion of targeted transparency – where the disclosure of information serves to bridge a gap in knowledge that otherwise contributes to public risk or service failures. The theoretical underpinning of targeted transparency is the "transparency action cycle" whereby disclosers provide information to the public in a format that responds to users' will and capacity to process and use that information at the point of decision-making.

The themes of enabling citizens to be more efficacious within their political system is evident in the other books, projects, and articles Fung has either written or contributed to. These include a 2000 book with Bradley Karkkainen and Charles Sabel entitled Beyond Backyard Environmentalism and Can We Put an End to Sweatshops, a 2001 book written with Dara O'Rourke and Charles Sabel. Fung has published numerous articles on these topics ranging from more theoretical pieces such as a 2005 article in Political Theory entitled "Deliberation Before the Revolution: Toward an Ethics of Deliberative Democracy in an Unjust World" to a 2007 article appearing in the American Political Science Review entitled "Democratic Theory and Political Science: A Pragmatic Method of Constructive Engagement" which bridges theory and practice.

Fung has engaged in current politics, having published a piece for The American Prospect in May 2010, entitled "A Tea Party for Obama". Additionally, Fung serves on the national advisory board of AmericaSpeaks and is a consultant for various organizations including the Open Society Institute and the World Bank.

As an indicator of Fung's personal and professional commitment to the ideals of transparency he has published a "Conflict Statement" on his personal website, which outlines his engagement with outside organizations: "First, as someone who seeks to understand the worlds of democratic reform and public policy, it is important to see things from the perspective of practitioners which is very different from the perspective of scholars. Working closely with practitioners is one way – the best way I know of – to gain that understanding."

Fung's more recent research focuses broadly on the realms of transparency in public and private governance as well as participatory democracy with a focus on deliberative forms of governance. His projects have examined democratic reform initiatives in electoral reform, urban planning, public services, ecosystem management, transnational governance, and the role of technology within the area of transparency and governance.

In September 2009, Fung launched Participedia, a website developed with Mark Warren of the University of British Columbia, aimed at strengthening democracy with its user-generated library of examples and methods of participatory governance, public deliberation, and collaborative public action.

== Awards and honors ==
- 1995 National Science Foundation Training Fellowship in Democratization
- 2006 Senior Scholar, Edmond J. Safra Foundation, Center for Ethics, Harvard University
