= Signal Cleveland =

Signal Cleveland is a nonprofit local newsroom in Cleveland, Ohio. It launched in 2022.
