= Mary Graham (writer) =

American author and public policy expert

- Born: Mary Wissler
- Education: B.A. Radcliffe College; J.D. Georgetown University Law Center
- Occupation: writer
- Spouse: Donald E. Graham (m. 1967; div. 2007)
- Children: 4

Mary W. Graham (née Wissler) is an American writer, legal scholar, and public policy expert known for her work on government transparency and public information. She co-founded and co-directs the Transparency Policy Project at Harvard University's John F. Kennedy School of Government. Graham has authored four books examining the politics of public information and the balance between government openness and secrecy.

== Early life and education ==
Graham grew up in Hyde Park on Chicago’s South Side. In high school, she co-edited the student newspaper and became interested in government secrecy during Mayor Richard J. Daley’s slum clearance projects. Encouraged by teacher Howard Sloan and the Hyde Park Herald, she developed an early interest in journalism. Her father, Robert W. Wissler, was a University of Chicago professor studying diet and heart disease; her mother, Elizabeth Anne Wissler, was a social worker. Both were birthright Quakers and Earlham College graduates.

Graham attended Harvard College on scholarship, majoring in Social Studies with a focus on city politics, and wrote for The Harvard Crimson. During college, she worked with Professors Edward C. Banfield and James Q. Wilson at the Harvard-MIT Joint Center for Urban Studies and conducted summer research on urban politics in cities like Cincinnati, Pittsburgh, Nashville, and San Francisco.

After graduation, she reported for the Southern Courier in Birmingham, Alabama, covering civil rights issues. She later earned her J.D. from Georgetown University Law Center.

== Career ==
Graham began her career at the U.S. Office of Management and Budget, where she worked on legislative and budget matters in an agency known for resolving inter-agency disputes behind closed doors. She later joined the U.S. Department of Transportation under Secretary William T. Coleman, working on regulatory reforms including early efforts to install airbags in passenger vehicles.

Graham is a former trustee of the Juilliard School for the Performing Arts and a former member of the visiting committee of the Columbia University School of Journalism.

She also serves as a trustee emerita of the John D. and Catherine T. MacArthur Foundation, and is a former board member of The Pew Charitable Trusts.

== Transparency policy project ==
Graham co-founded and co-directs the Transparency Policy Project at Harvard Kennedy School with Archon Fung and David Weil. The project examines how disclosure tools like safety ratings and chemical reports act as regulatory mechanisms, highlighting both their potential and limitations.

Graham serves as a trustee of the Associated Press Fund for Journalism and serves on steering committees for Press Forward. From 2001 to 2013, Graham was a board member for the Chicago-based MacArthur Foundation. In 2010, she joined the advisory board for the Wikimedia Foundation's Public Policy Initiative.

In 2007, she co-authored Full Disclosure: The Perils and Promise of Transparency with Archon Fung and David Weil, exploring how public disclosure policies function as a form of governance.

Her 2017 book, Presidents’ Secrets: The Use and Abuse of Hidden Power, examined historical struggles over presidential secrecy.

Her 2002 book Democracy by Disclosure: The Rise of Technopopulism profiled transparency policies intended to reduce toxic chemical releases, improve public nutrition, and lower hospital error rates.

Her first book in 1999, The Morning After Earth Day: Practical Environmental Politics, examined the evolution of environmental policy from reducing factories’ pollution to addressing practices of farmers, community residents, and local businesses.

Graham has written articles for The Atlantic Monthly, Financial Times, Environment, Issues in Science and Technology, and other publications, covering topics ranging from vaccine hesitancy and bankruptcy reform to remote sensing technology and corporate transparency. In 2025, she published the policy brief Information Inequality Can Be a Matter of Life or Death, advocating for timely, equitable, and actionable public health and safety alerts.

== Personal life ==
In 1967, Graham married Donald E. Graham, grandson of Eugene Meyer. In 2007, the couple announced that they were separating. They have four children.
