= List of The Harvard Crimson people =

People who were on the staff of The Harvard Crimson

The following is a list of notable people who have served on the staff of The Harvard Crimson, the student newspaper at Harvard University.

== Authors, journalists, and writers ==
=== Editors, journalists, and reporters ===
- Jonathan Alter, author covering U.S. presidents
- Joseph Alsop, political reporter
- Marc Ambinder, journalist, USC professor, and television producer
- Cleveland Amory, writer and animal rights activist; former Crimson president
- Charles W. Bailey II, editor of the The Minnesota Star Tribune, co-author of Seven Days in May
- Joseph Fels Barnes, reporter and executive director of the Institute of Pacific Relations
- Lucius Beebe, food critic and railroad historian
- William M. Beecher, Pulitzer Prize–winning reporter for The Boston Globe, The Wall Street Journal, The New York Times, and The Minnesota Star Tribune
- Nina Bernstein, Pulitzer Prize–winning reporter for The New York Times
- Sarah Boxer, art critic for The New York Times
- Jess Bravin, Wall Street Journal reporter covering the Supreme Court of the United States
- Eric Breindel, New York Post columnist and editorial page editor
- Bartle Bull, editor for Middle East Monitor and Prospect
- David Burnham, reporter for The New York Times
- Diane Cardwell, renewable energy reporter for The New York Times
- Casey Cep, writer for The New Yorker
- Sewell Chan, journalist for The Los Angeles Times
- Susan Chira, Pulitzer Prize winner and former editor-in-chief of The Marshall Project; former Crimson president
- Nicholas Ciarelli, founder and editor of Think Secret; founder of BookBub
- Adam Clymer, author, journalist for The New York Times; former Crimson president
- Jonathan Cohn, author, journalist for HuffPost; former Crimson president
- Sarah Crichton, writer and editor
- William O. Dapping, reporter for The Citizen in Auburn, New York
- Lynn Darling, reporter and editor at The Washington Post and Esquire
- Esther Dyson, digital technology analyst, author
- David Edelstein, film critic
- Daniel Ellsberg, author, released the Pentagon Papers
- David Fahrenthold, Pulitzer Prize–winning political reporter for The New York Times
- James Fallows, journalist and speechwriter for Jimmy Carter; former Crimson president
- Susan Faludi, Pulitzer Prize–winning reporter and author
- Christopher John Farley, culture writer for The Wall Street Journal
- Sydney P. Freedberg, Pulitzer Prize winner and investigative reporter
- Alix M. Freedman, reporter and editor with The New York Times, The Wall Street Journal, and Reuters
- Otto Fuerbringer, former editor of Time; former Crimson president
- David Gessner, essayist, editor, and cartoonist
- Susan Glasser, journalist at The New Yorker
- George Goodman, a.k.a. "Adam Smith," hosted the Emmy award-winning program Adam Smith's Money World on PBS
- Garrett Graff, former editor of Politico Magazine and the Washingtonian
- Linda Greenhouse, journalist for The New York Times
- Michael Grunwald, journalist at Politico Magazine
- Anemona Hartocollis, reporter for The New York Times
- Laurie Hays, reporter and editor for The Wall Street Journal and Bloomberg News
- Rosalind S. Helderman, reporter with The New York Times
- Hendrik Hertzberg, journalist for The New Yorker
- Fred Hiatt, Pulitzer Prize winner and editor for The Washington Post
- Harry Hurt III, writer, professional golfer, and biographer of Donald Trump
- John Jay Iselin, journalist and president of the Marconi Society
- Peter Kaplan, former editor-in-chief of The New York Observer, current creative director of Condé Nast Traveler
- Mickey Kaus, journalist and political blogger
- Sam Koppelman, journalist, founder of Hunterbrook
- Charles Lane, former editor of The New Republic
- Jennifer 8. Lee, former journalist for The New York Times
- John Leonard, film and culture critic
- Ivan Levingston, reporter for the Financial Times
- Anthony Lewis, Pulitzer Prize winner, author, and former columnist for The New York Times
- Annie Lowrey, author and staff writer at The Atlantic
- Arthur Lubow, journalist
- J. Anthony Lukas, author and Pulitzer Prize–winning journalist
- Michael M. Luo, executive editor of The New Yorker
- Jay Mathews, education reporter
- Dylan Matthews, writer for Vox
- Victor McElheny, science journalist and founder of the Knight Science Journalism program
- Seth Mnookin, author of Hard News
- Ivan Oransky, co-founder of Retraction Watch
- Evan Osnos, journalist for The New Yorker
- Phil Patton, reporter on design, culture, and automotive topics
- Alexandra Petri, comedy writer for The Washington Post
- Steven V. Roberts, former reporter for The New York Times, television journalist
- Margot Roosevelt, labor reporter for the Los Angeles Times and great-granddaughter of Theodore Roosevelt
- Scott Rosenberg, co-founder of Salon.com and editor at Axios
- Yair Rosenberg, staff writer for The Atlantic
- Claire Saffitz, food critic, YouTube personality, and former writer for Bon Appétit
- David Sanger, Pulitzer Prize–winning journalist for The New York Times
- Charlie Savage, Pulitzer Prize–winning journalist for The New York Times
- Janny Scott, Pulitzer Prize–winning reporter for The New York Times
- Raymond Sokolov, food critic for The Wall Street Journal
- Michael Sragow, film critic
- Richard Strout, journalist with The Christian Science Monitor and The New Republic
- Steven C. Swett, reporter with The Baltimore Sun, The Wall Street Journal, and Valley News
- William Roscoe Thayer, author, editor, and historian
- Evan Thomas, associate managing editor of Newsweek
- James Ulmer, entertainment reporter and namesake of the Ulmer scale
- Craig Unger, author and journalist
- Amy Wilentz, journalist and contributing editor at The Nation
- Graeme Wood, author and journalist at The Atlantic
- Annie Zaleski, music historian and reporter

=== Columnists, critics, and opinion writers ===
- Steve Chapman, columnist, Chicago Tribune
- Noam Cohen, author and columnist for The New York Times
- E. J. Dionne, columnist for The Washington Post
- Ross Douthat, columnist for The New York Times
- David Ignatius, columnist for The Washington Post
- Nicholas D. Kristof, Pulitzer Prize–winning columnist for The New York Times
- Frank Rich, columnist for The New York Times
- Robert J. Samuelson, reporter and columnist
- Stephen Stromberg, Washington Post editorial board

=== Executives, founders, and publishers ===
- Ravi Agrawal, editor-in-chief of Foreign Policy
- Alessandra Galloni, editor in chief of Reuters
- Donald E. Graham, CEO and chairman of The Washington Post Co.; former Crimson president
- Sam Jacobs, editor-in-chief of Time
- Boisfeuillet Jones Jr., publisher and CEO of The Washington Post; former Crimson president
- Joseph Kahn, executive editor of The New York Times; former Crimson president
- Michael Kinsley, journalist, founding editor of Slate magazine
- Wendy Lesser, founder of The Threepenny Review
- Jessica Lessin, founder of The Information
- Seth Lipsky, founder of The New York Sun and the English-language version of The Forward
- Eric Newcomer, tech journalist and founder of the publication Newcomer
- Noah Oppenheim, president of NBC News
- David Plotz, former CEO of Atlas Obscura and host of Slate Political Gabfest
- Jack Rosenthal, Pulitzer Prize–winning journalist for The New York Times and president of the New York Times Company Foundation
- Robert Ellis Smith, journalist and creator of the Privacy Journal; former Crimson president
- Ira Stoll, New York Sun executive; former Crimson president
- Joseph J. Thorndike, managing editor of Life and co-founder of American Heritage and Horizon
- Philip Weiss, co-editor of Mondoweiss and anti-Zionist
- Mark Whitaker, senior vice president of NBC News, former editor of Newsweek

=== Foreign correspondents ===
- David Halberstam, Pulitzer Prize–winning reporter and author and author
- Selig S. Harrison, reporter specializing in North Korea and East Asia
- Javier Hernández, Tokyo bureau chief of The New York Times
- Peter R. Kann, Pulitzer Prize–winning reporter for The Wall Street Journal
- Stanley Karnow, Pulitzer Prize winner and writer on East Asia and the Vietnam War
- A. J. Langguth, Saigon bureau chief for The New York Times; former Crimson president
- Philip Pan, journalist and author
- John Sack, war correspondent
- Anton Troianovski, Moscow bureau chief of The New York Times
- George Weller, novelist, playwright, Pulitzer Prize–winning journalist for The New York Times and The Chicago Daily News
- Theodore H. White, prominent political and WWII journalist

=== Authors ===
- Richard Beck, author
- Lisa Brennan-Jobs, author and daughter of Steve Jobs
- Soman Chainani, author of the The School for Good and Evil series
- Michael Crichton, author
- Timothy Crouse, author of The Boys on the Bus
- John Putnam Demos, author and historian of the Salem witch trials
- Nikki Erlick, novelist
- V.V. Ganeshananthan, author and journalist
- James Gleick, author and historian of science
- Adam Goodheart, author and Civil War historian
- Dara Horn, novelist and author of People Love Dead Jews
- Henry James, writer and biographer
- Myron Kaufmann, novelist and author of Remember Me to God
- Adam Kirsch, poet and literary critic
- Faye Levine, author and playwright
- Charles Thornton Libby, author and historian
- Michael Maccoby, New York Times best-selling author and psychoanalyst; former Crimson president
- Michael Massing, MacArthur Fellow and author of books on the war on drugs and the Iraq War
- Judith Matloff, author and war correspondent
- Martin Mayer, novelist
- Matthew Quirk, novelist
- Michael E. Raynor, author of books on business management
- Tom Reiss, Pulitzer Prize–winning author of The Black Count
- Abraham Josephine Riesman, reporter and biographer
- David Riesman, sociologist and author of The Lonely Crowd
- Joel Townsley Rogers, science fiction writer
- Phyllis Rose, biographer and literary critic
- John Sedgwick, author and American historian
- Linda Gray Sexton, novelist
- Clea Simon, writer and author
- Bayard Tuckerman, biographer
- Suzy Welch, business author and wife of General Electric CEO Jack Welch
- Natalie Wexler, author focused on education and equity
- Owen Wister, author of The Virginian and "father of Western fiction"
- Elizabeth Wurtzel, author

=== Sports reporters ===
- Andrew Beyer, horse racing reporter and inventor of the Beyer Speed Figure
- Jennifer Frey, sports reporter for The New York Times and The Washington Post
- Gwen Knapp, sports reporter for The Philadelphia Inquirer, the San Francisco Examiner, the San Francisco Chronicle, and The New York Times
- Jon Morosi, reporter with MLB Network and NHL Network
- John Powers, Pulitzer Prize winner, sports reporter for The Boston Globe, and the "dean of Olympic journalists"
- Pablo Torre, ESPN writer, television personality, podcast host

=== Photojournalists ===
- Deborah Copaken, author and photojournalist
- Burt Glinn, photojournalist
- Diana Mara Henry, photographer and photojournalist
- Laura Levine, hip-hop and rock music photographer
- John Loengard, photographer and former picture editor of Life magazine

=== Radio and television ===
- Michael Barone, television commentator, writer for The Washington Examiner, author
- Irin Carmon, reporter for MSNBC
- Jim Cramer, host of CNBC's Mad Money; former Crimson president
- David Greene, reporter for NPR nad host of Left, Right & Center
- Jennifer Griffin, Pentagon correspondent for Fox News
- Mary Louise Kelly, co-host of NPR's All Things Considered
- Melissa Lee, CNBC news anchor
- Errol Louis, journalist and television show host
- Leon Neyfakh, radio host and author of The Next Next Level
- Michael Okwu, former correspondent for CNN and NBC News
- Abby Phillip, CNN news anchor
- Katrina Szish, television personality
- Jeffrey Toobin, senior legal analyst for CNN
- Selina Wang, White House correspondent for ABC News
- Kristen Welker, NBC News and Meet the Press host

== Academia ==
=== Administrators ===
- David Bosco, associate dean of the Hamilton Lugar School of Global and International Studies at Indiana University
- Douglass Cater, 22nd president of Washington College in Maryland, aide to President Lyndon B. Johnson
- James Bryant Conant, president of Harvard University 1933–1953
- William Emerson, first dean of the MIT School of Architecture
- Mark Gearan, former Peace Corps director and president of the Harvard Kennedy School Institute of Politics
- Mary Graham, writer and co-director of the Transparency Policy Project at the Harvard Kennedy School
- Carol J. Greenhouse, professor at Princeton University, sister of Linda Greenhouse
- Joseph S. Iseman, acting president of Bennington College and educator affiliated with PBS and Sesame Workshop
- Nicholas Lemann, dean emeritus of the Columbia University Graduate School of Journalism; former Crimson president
- Alfred Henry Lloyd, philosopher and interim president at the University of Michigan
- Jennifer Mnookin, president of Columbia University
- John U. Monro, dean of Harvard College
- Robert M. O'Neil, president of the University of Virginia
- Henry Varnum Poor, associate dean of Yale Law School
- Joshua Sharfstein, vice dean at the Johns Hopkins Bloomberg School of Public Health
- Peter Tufano, former dean of the Saïd Business School

=== Professors ===
==== Humanities, social sciences, and law ====
- Jeffrey Alexander, professor at UCLA and Yale
- Stephen Barnett, legal scholar at University of California, Berkeley School of Law who opposed the Newspaper Preservation Act of 1970; former Crimson president
- W. W. Bartley III, philosopher and professor at California State University, Hayward
- Gary J. Bass, professor of politics at Princeton University and Pulitzer Prize finalist
- Nancy Bauer, professor of philosophy at Tufts University and dean of the School of the Museum of Fine Arts at Tufts
- Tal Ben-Shahar, professor of psychology and leadership
- James R. Beniger, author and professor at USC Annenberg School for Communication and Journalism
- Marilyn Booth, professor at the University of Oxford
- David Bruck, law professor at Washington and Lee University School of Law
- Randall Collins, sociologist and professor at the University of Pennsylvania
- Ian Condry, professor of Japanese culture at MIT
- Geoffrey Cowan, professor at USC Annenberg School for Communication and Journalism
- Laura A. Dickinson, professor at George Washington University Law School
- James A. Field, demographer and professor at the University of Chicago
- Jesse Fried, professor at Harvard Law School
- Laura E. Gómez, professor at the UCLA School of Law
- Jamal Greene, professor at Columbia Law School
- Farah Griffin, professor of African-American literature at Columbia University
- Ariela Gross, professor at the UCLA School of Law
- Benjamin W. Heineman Jr., writer, GE executive, and professor at Harvard Law School
- James Hershberg, professor of international history specializing in the Cold War at George Washington University
- Richard Hyland, professor at Rutgers Law School
- Christopher Jencks, professor and social scientist
- Margot Kaminski, professor at University of Colorado Law School
- Thomas Samuel Kuhn, philosopher and historian of science
- Charles Kurzman, professor of Islamic studies at the University of North Carolina at Chapel Hill
- Charles S. Maier, professor of history at Harvard University
- Pauline Maier, historian of the American Revolution and professor at MIT
- F. Warren McFarlan, professor at Harvard Business School
- John Ulric Nef, economic historian
- Eric M. Nelson, professor of government at Harvard
- Stephen E. Sachs, professor at Harvard Law School
- Maurice Samuels, professor of French at Yale University; director of the Yale Program for the Study of Antisemitism
- Martha A. Sandweiss, professor of history at Princeton University
- M. E. Sarotte, historian and professor at Johns Hopkins University
- Gay Seidman, sociologist and professor at the University of Wisconsin–Madison; first female Crimson president
- Wendy Seltzer, professor and former board member of the World Wide Web Foundation
- Daniel Sharfstein, professor at Vanderbilt University
- Ganesh Sitaraman, professor at Vanderbilt University
- Madhavi Sunder, professor at Georgetown University Law Center
- Edward Henry Warren, professor at Harvard Law School
- Ruth Wedgwood, professor at Johns Hopkins University
- Claude E. Welch Jr., political scientist at SUNY at Buffalo; former Crimson president
- Barrett Wendell, English professor at Harvard and the University of Paris
- David Yermack, professor of finance at New York University Stern School of Business

==== Sciences ====
- Rediet Abebe, computer scientist, University of California, Berkeley
- Silas D. Alben, mathematician and professor at the University of Michigan
- Joel E. Cohen, professor at Rockefeller University
- Rupert Emerson, professor of political science at Harvard
- Kristin Goss, professor of public policy at Duke University
- Peter Kramer, psychiatrist, author
- Maryanthe Malliaris, professor of mathematics at the University of Chicago
- Bernardo L. Sabatini, professor at Harvard Medical School
- Peter M. Shane, professor at Moritz College of Law
- William Sydney Thayer, professor of medicine at Johns Hopkins School of Medicine

== Business ==
=== CEOs and executives ===
- William Henry Baldwin Jr., president of the Long Island Rail Road and trustee of Tuskegee University
- Steve Ballmer, former CEO of Microsoft and owner of the Los Angeles Clippers
- Gordon Bellamy, video game executive
- Gardner Cowles Jr., co-owner of the Cowles Media Company
- John Cowles Sr., co-owner of the Cowles Media Company
- Robert Decherd, CEO of A. H. Belo Corporation; former Crimson president
- Richard Edelman, CEO of public relations firm Edelman
- Robert E. Grady, venture capitalist and Republican economic advisor
- Andy Jassy, CEO of Amazon
- J. Spencer Love, president and chairman of Burlington Industries; namesake of the Love School of Business at Elon University
- Eric Redman, author and clean energy executive
- Ben Sherwood, former president of Disney-ABC Television Group and ABC News
- Walter H. Wheeler Jr., president of Pitney Bowes
- Susan Wojcicki, CEO of YouTube
- Jeff Zucker, president of CNN and former president and CEO of NBC Universal; former Crimson president

=== Founders ===
- Pierpaolo Barbieri, founder of Ualá, author, and economic historian
- Hayley Barna, co-founder of Birchbox
- Nathan Blecharczyk, co-founder of Airbnb
- Tyler Bosmeny, founder of Clever and visiting partner at Y Combinator
- Charlie Cheever, co-founder of Quora
- Parker Conrad, founder of Zenefits and Rippling
- John Freund, co-founder of Intuitive Surgical and venture capitalist
- Jennifer Hyman, co-founder of Rent The Runway

=== Finance ===
- Amos Tuck French, banker
- Albert Hamilton Gordon, owner of Kidder Peabody
- Matthew Granade, senior executive at Bridgewater and Point72
- George Gund II, banker, real estate investor, and founder of The George Gund Foundation
- Alfred Winslow Jones, "father of the hedge fund industry"
- Thomas W. Lamont, former chairman of J.P. Morgan & Co.
- Thomas H. Lee, founder of Thomas H. Lee Partners and an early pioneer of leveraged buyouts
- James S. Marcus, investment banker and philanthropist
- David Rockefeller, chairman of Chase Manhattan Bank and member of the Rockefeller family
- Philip Roosevelt, author, investment banker, and member of the Roosevelt family
- Walter E. Sachs, partner at Goldman Sachs and part of the Goldman–Sachs family
- Frederick M. Warburg, partner of Kuhn, Loeb & Co.
- James Warburg, banker and member of the Warburg family
- Byron Wien, prominent investor with Morgan Stanley and Blackstone

== Film and television ==
- Paul Attanasio, two-time Academy Award nominee for Best Adapted Screenplay
- Eli Attie, speechwriter and screenwriter
- B. J. Averell, The Amazing Race season nine winner
- Michael Colton, screenwriter of Home Economics and A Futile and Stupid Gesture
- Richard Connell, author, screenwriter, and 1941 Oscar nominee
- Ethan Drogin, writer for Suits and Lie to Me
- Jeffrey D. Dunn, former CEO of Sesame Workshop
- David Frankel, filmmaker
- Lauren Greenfield, documentary filmmaker
- Herbert Dudley Hale Jr., documentary filmmaker for the State Department and U.S. military
- Colin Jost, comedian and writer for Saturday Night Live
- Marty Kaplan, speechwriter for Walter Mondale, television executive, professor at the Norman Lear Center
- Sierra Katow, actress, comedian, and podcaster
- Henry W. McGee, former president of HBO Home Entertainment and Harvard Business School lecturer
- Aline Brosh McKenna, screenwriter and co-creator of Crazy Ex-Girlfriend
- Bruce L. Paisner, CEO of International Academy of Television Arts and Sciences
- Adam Perlman, writer for The Good Wife and The Newsroom; executive producer for Billions
- Peter Sagal, host of NPR's Wait Wait... Don't Tell Me!
- Nell Scovell, creator of Sabrina the Teenage Witch and co-author of Lean In
- Whit Stillman, filmmaker
- Baratunde Thurston, television host, comedian, and commentator
- James Toback, screenwriter and 1992 Oscar nominee
- Erinn Westbrook, actress

== Government and politics ==
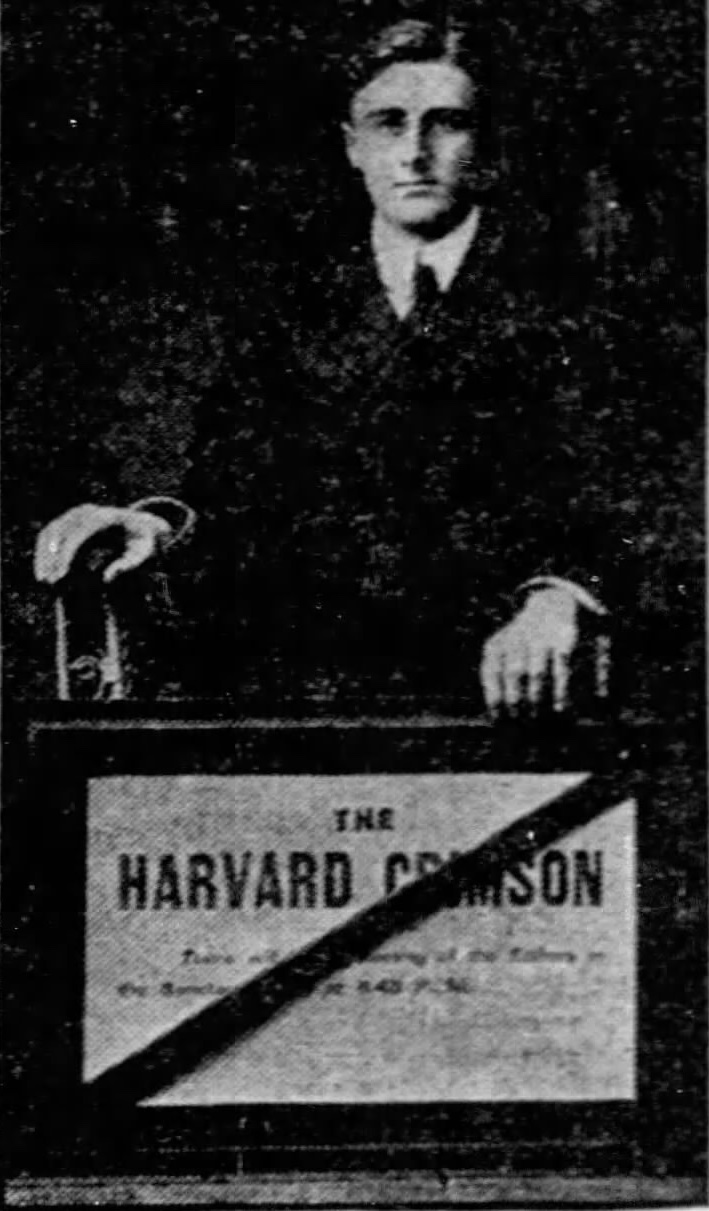
Franklin D. Roosevelt during his tenure as editor

=== Presidents of the United States ===
- John F. Kennedy, 35th president of the United States
- Franklin D. Roosevelt, 32nd president of the United States; former Crimson president

=== Cabinet secretaries ===
- Robert Bacon, secretary of state during the Theodore Roosevelt administration
- Antony Blinken, secretary of state during the Biden administration
- Pete Buttigieg, former mayor of South Bend, Indiana and 2020 presidential candidate
- Merrick Garland, United States attorney general during the Biden administration, former circuit judge and former Supreme Court nominee
- Gina Raimondo, former governor of Rhode Island and secretary of commerce during the Biden administration
- Caspar Weinberger, United States secretary of defense under President Ronald Reagan

=== Governors ===
- Franklin S. Billings, governor of Vermont
- Robert F. Bradford, governor of Massachusetts
- Curtis Guild Jr., governor of Massachusetts

=== Members of Congress ===
- Henry Alden Clark, representative from Pennsylvania; co-founder of The Crimson
- Richard Blumenthal, senator from Connecticut
- Robert J. Bulkley, senator from Ohio
- Tom Cotton, senator from Arkansas
- Augustus P. Gardner, representative from Massachusetts
- Bill Green, representative from New York
- Alanson B. Houghton, representative from New York and U.S. ambassador to Germany and the United Kingdom
- W. Kingsland Macy, representative from New York
- Chris Pappas, representative from New Hampshire
- Elise Stefanik, representative from New York
- Samuel Winslow, representative from Massachusetts

=== Ambassadors ===
- Alfred Atherton, U.S. Ambassador to Egypt
- Dan Baer, U.S. ambassador to the OSCE and executive director of the Colorado Department of Higher Education
- Donald Blinken, U.S. ambassador to Hungary; co-founder of Warburg Pincus
- David Gray, U.S. ambassador to Ireland
- Joseph Grew, U.S. ambassador to Japan from 1932 until December 8, 1941
- Caroline Kennedy, U.S. ambassador to Australia; daughter of U.S. President John F. Kennedy
- Lithgow Osborne, U.S. ambassador to Norway
- Ted Osius, U.S. ambassador to Vietnam
- Robert Maxwell Pringle, U.S. Ambassador to Mali
- David Scheffer, U.S. ambassador-at-large for War Crimes Issues
- Frederic Jesup Stimson, writer and U.S. ambassador to Argentina
- Henry Serrano Villard, U.S. ambassador to Senegal and Mauritania

=== State and local elected officials ===
- Michael J. Barrett, Massachusetts state senator
- Christopher Blazejewski, speaker of the Rhode Island House of Representatives
- Matt Blumenthal, member of the Connecticut House of Representatives
- Mike Bonin, member of the Los Angeles City Council
- John A. Denison, mayor of Springfield, Massachusetts
- Edgar Gonzalez Jr., member of the Illinois House of Representatives
- David LeBoeuf, Massachusetts state representative
- Nick Melvoin, Los Angeles Unified School District board member
- Josiah Quincy VI, mayor of Boston
- Peter Shapiro, youngest-ever person elected to the New Jersey General Assembly
- Russell A. Wood, Massachusetts State Auditor

=== Appointed government officials ===
- Daniel Benjamin, coordinator for Counterterrorism at the State Department
- Amanda Bennett, Pulitzer Prize–winning reporter and editor, CEO of the United States Agency for Global Media during the Biden administration
- Daniel J. Boorstin, author, writer, and Librarian of Congress
- Louis A. Coolidge, Assistant Secretary of the Treasury under Presidents Theodore Roosevelt and William Howard Taft
- Jon Finer, deputy national security advisor in the Biden administration
- Edward Forst, Administrator of General Services during the second presidency of Donald Trump
- James Glassman, journalist, diplomat, and director of the George W. Bush Institute
- Herbert P. Gleason, Boston's chief legal counsel
- C. Boyden Gray, Committee for Justice chairman and White House counsel to President George H. W. Bush
- Adam S. Hickey, former deputy assistant attorney general
- Gilbert B. Kaplan, under secretary of Commerce for International Trade
- Saritha Komatireddy, chief of staff for the Drug Enforcement Administration and Republican nominee in the 2026 New York Attorney General election
- Charles Moore, city planner and founding member of the Commission of Fine Arts
- Herbert Putnam, Librarian of Congress 1899–1939
- Andrew Samwick, chief economist of the Council of Economic Advisers during the George W. Bush administration and professor at Dartmouth College
- Ben Shuldiner, superintendent of Seattle Public Schools
- Arthur Sweetser, journalist and diplomat
- Travis Harvard Whitney, head of the New York Public Service Commission
- Adam Yarmolinsky, staffer in the Kennedy, Lyndon Johnson, and Carter administrations
- John Yoo, Deputy Assistant Attorney General during the George W. Bush administration

=== Political operatives and organizers ===
- William Barnes Jr., newspaper publisher and chair of the New York Republican Party
- Andrei Cherny, former chair of the Arizona Democratic Party and co-founder of Aspiration
- Blair Clark, manager of Eugene McCarthy's 1968 presidential campaign; former Crimson president
- Susan Estrich, campaign manager for Michael Dukakis in 1988
- Brian Fallon, press secretary for Hillary Clinton in 2016 and communications director for Kamala Harris in 2024
- Peter Ferrara, policy analyst with The Heartland Institute and climate change denialist
- Frederick Vanderbilt Field, socialist activist
- Sam Graham-Felsen, blog director for Barack Obama in 2008
- Mitchell Goodman, writer and high-profile figure in the Vietnam War draft resistance movement
- Powers Hapgood, Socialist Party leader
- Corliss Lamont, founder of the National Council of American–Soviet Friendship
- Grover Norquist, president of Americans for Tax Reform
- Mark Penn, chief political strategist for Hillary Clinton's 2008 presidential campaign
- Robert Rafsky, HIV/AIDS activist
- Kathie Sarachild, radical feminist
- Douglas Schoen, political consultant and pundit
- Paul Sweezy, Marxist economist and funder of the Monthly Review
- Fairfax Henry Wheelan, San Francisco political reformer

=== International political figures ===
- Alastair Rellie, MI6 director
- Chrystia Freeland, Deputy Prime Minister of Canada
- Ryōsuke Takashima, mayor of Ashiya, Japan

== Law ==
=== Federal and state judges ===
- David J. Barron, circuit judge on the United States Court of Appeals for the First Circuit; former Crimson president
- Theodore D. Chuang, judge on the United States District Court for the District of Maryland
- Paul A. Engelmayer, circuit judge on the United States District Court for the Southern District of New York
- Michael E. Farbiarz, judge on the United States District Court for the District of New Jersey
- Melissa Hart, justice on the Colorado Supreme Court
- Leondra Kruger, associate justice of the Supreme Court of California
- John T. Noonan Jr., circuit judge on the United States Court of Appeals for the Ninth Circuit
- Patti B. Saris, judge on the United States District Court for the District of Massachusetts
- Hiller B. Zobel, associate justice of the Massachusetts Superior Court

=== Attorneys ===
- Francis R. Appleton, prominent 19th-century attorney
- Arthur A. Ballantine, attorney and first-ever solicitor for the IRS
- Hugh Calkins, lawyer and education reformer; former Crimson president
- Garrett Epps, author and law school professor; former Crimson president
- Peter Jaszi, legal expert on copyright law
- Albert M. Kales, originator of the Missouri Plan
- Alexandra Korry, Sullivan & Cromwell attorney, Columbia Law School adjunct professor, and stop-and-frisk critic
- David Lat, founder of Above the Law
- Shannon Liss-Riordan, labor attorney and candidate for the 2020 United States Senate election in Massachusetts
- Harry Litman, United States Attorney for the Western District of Pennsylvania during the Clinton administration
- Nicole Seligman, attorney for Bill Clinton during his impeachment trial and director for OpenAI
- Peter Y. Solmssen, general counsel of Siemens
- Samuel D. Warren II, co-founder of Nutter McClennen & Fish with Louis Brandeis

== Military ==
- Frederick Hobbes Allen, lieutenant commander in the Naval Reserve Flying Corps during World War I
- J. Sinclair Armstrong, chairman of the Securities and Exchange Commission and Assistant Secretary of the Navy
- Winthrop Astor Chanler, Rough Rider and World War I veteran
- Woodbury Kane, Rough Rider
- Hanford MacNider, lieutenant general in the U.S. Army, World War I and World War II veteran, U.S. ambassador to Canada
- Charles Coudert Nast, major general in the U.S. Army

== Music and art ==
- George Biddle, painter and muralist
- Jacob Brackman, lyricist and musical collaborator with Carly Simon
- Archibald Brown, architect and competitor in the architecture event at the 1936 Summer Olympics
- John Alden Carpenter, composer
- Brynn Elliott, singer-songwriter
- Peter Engel, origami artist
- Ellen Harvey, conceptual artist
- James Loeb, art collector
- Scott Rothkopf, director of the Whitney Museum of American Art
- Stephen O. Saxe, graphic designer and historian of printing
- Edward Perry Warren, art collector

== Science and medicine ==
- Wilder Dwight Bancroft, chemist
- Peter Breggin, psychiatrist, author, and ADHD critic
- Francis P. Farquhar, mountaineer and environmentalist
- Jerome Davis Greene, diplomat, planner of the Harvard Tercentenary celebration, and co-founder of the American Sexual Health Association
- Roger Sherman Greene II, U.S. diplomat and medical administrator in China
- Michael J. Halberstam, cardiologist and author, brother of David Halberstam
- Rustin McIntosh, pediatrician
- Bill McKibben, environmentalist, author; former Crimson president
- Matthew Meyerson, pathologist at Dana–Farber Cancer Institute
- William Pao, oncologist, professor at Vanderbilt University Medical Center, former executive at Pfizer
- Mark L. Rosenberg, CEO of The Task Force for Global Health and Rear admiral for the United States Public Health Service
- Jay Varma, epidemiologist who led New York City's response to the COVID-19 pandemic
- Andrew Weil, alternative medicine advocate

== Sports ==
- Ben Beach, record holder for most consecutive completed Boston Marathons
- Edward Bowditch, two-time college football All-American
- Burke Boyce, fencer in the 1924 Summer Olympics
- Charles Dudley Daly, Harvard quarterback, Army head coach, College Football Hall of Fame inductee, and colonel during World War I
- Arthur Cumnock, Harvard football captain and 1889 All-America college football team
- Jon Ledecky, owner of the New York Islanders
- Frank A. Mason, football head coach at Harvard and Ole Miss
- Richard Sears, seven-time US Open men's singles champion, including the first-ever US Open, and six-time US Open men's doubles champion
- David Stearns, general manager of the New York Mets
- Howard Taylor, 1889 US Open men's doubles champion

== Theology and religion ==
- Walter Russell Bowie, Episcopalian priest
- Robert Hallowell Gardiner III, head of the Brotherhood of St. Andrew
- Franklin Elmer Ellsworth Hamilton, Methodist bishop
- James Huntington, founder of the Anglican Order of the Holy Cross; co-founder of The Crimson
- Elie Kaunfer, rabbi and co-founder of Yeshivat Hadar
- Clifford Phelps Morehouse, editor of The Living Church magazine
- Remsen Brinckerhoff Ogilby, Episcopalian priest and president of Trinity College
- Ivan Panin, Biblical numerologist
- Ethan Tucker, rabbi and co-founder of Yeshivat Hadar in Manhattan

== Recent Harvard Crimson leadership ==
Harvard Crimson leadership (1990–present)
Year	Board	President	Managing editor	Associate managing editor	Business manager
2026	153	E. Matteo Diaz	Dhruv T. Patel	Laurel M. Shugart Cam N. Srivastava	L.P. Chavez Lopez-Ibañez
2025	152	McKenna E. McKrell	Tilly R. Robinson	Sally E. Edwards Cam E. Kettles	Jack D. Jassy
2024	151	J. Sellers Hill	Miles J. Herszenhorn	Elias J. Schisgall Claire Yuan	Matthew M. Doctoroff
2023	150	Cara J. Chang	Brandon L. Kingdollar	Leah J. Teichholtz Meimei Xu	Cynthia V. Lu
2022	149	Raquel Coronell Uribe	Jasper G. Goodman	Kelsey J. Griffin Taylor C. Peterman	Amy X. Zhou
2021	148	Amanda Y. Su	James S. Bikales	Sydnie M. Cobb Ema R. Schumer	Melissa H. Du
2020	147	Aidan F. Ryan	Shera S. Avi-Yonah	Alexandra A. Chaidez Molly C. McCafferty	Emily M. Lu
2019	146	Kristine E. Guillaume	Angela N. Fu	Jamie D. Halper	Charlie B. Zhu
2018	145	Derek G. Xiao	Hannah Natanson	Mia C. Karr Claire E. Parker	Nathan Y. Lee
2017	144	Derek K. Choi	Andrew M. Duehren	Jalin P. Cunningham Daphne C. Thompson	Christopher J. Huh
2016	143	Mariel A. Klein	Meg P. Bernhard	Noah J. Delwiche Ivan B. K. Levingston	Leia N. Wedlund
2015	142	Steven S. Lee	Madeline R. Conway	Matthew Q. Clarida Steven R. Watros	Juliet A. Nelson
2014	141	Samuel Y. Weinstock	Nicholas P. Fandos	Nikita Kansra	Joseph R. Botros
2013	140	Robert S. Samuels	Rebecca D. Robbins	Hana N. Rouse Justin C. Worland	Andrew F. Creamer
2012	139	E. Benjamin Samuels	Julie M. Zauzmer	Gautam S. Kumar Zoe A. Y. Weinberg	J. Sebastian Garcia
2011	138	Naveen N. Srivatsa	Elias J. Groll	Eric P. Newcomer Noah S. Rayman	Martin C. Ye
2010	137	Peter F. Zhu	Esther I. Yi	Lauren D. Kiel June Q. Wu	Julian L. Bouma
2009	136	Maxwell L. Child	Clifford M. Marks	Aditi Balakrishna Christian B. Flow	Steven J. Stelmach
2008	135	Malcom A. Glenn	Paras D. Bhayani	Laurence H. M. Holland Samuel P. Jacobs	Gideon L. Lowin
2007	134	Kristina M. Moore	Javier C. Hernández	Evan H. Jacobs Anton S. Troianovski	Roger R. Lee
2006	133	William C. Marra	Zachary M. Seward	May Habib Daniel J. Hemel	Nicholas A. Molina
2005	132	Lauren A. E. Schuker	Stephen M. Marks	Katharine A. Kaplan Rebecca D. O'Brien	Gregory B. Michnikov Evan M. Vittor
2004	131	Ericka K. Jalli	Elisabeth S. Theodore	Jenifer L. Steinhardt	Ashley B. T. Ma
2003	130	Amit R. Paley	David H. Gellis	Kate L. Rakoczy	Brian W. Dillard
2002	129	Imtiyaz H. Delawala	Daniela J. Lamas	Juliet J. Chung Daniel P. Mosteller	K. Babi Das Oliver J. Bell Rudrabishek Sahay
2001	128	C. Matthew MacInnis	V. V. Ganeshananthan Parker R. Conrad	V. V. Ganeshananthan	Fiona C. Chin
2000	127	Alan E. Wirzbicki	Rosalind S. Helderman	Marc J. Ambinder Jenny E. Heller	Adam S. Cohen
1999	126	Joshua H. Simon	Georgia N. Alexakis	David A. Fahrenthold	James L. Hegyi
1998	125	Matthew W. Granade	Andrew S. Chang		Justin S. Funches
1997	124	Joshua J. Schanker	Valerie J. MacMillan Andrew A. Green		Matthew L. Kramer
1996	123	Todd F. Braunstein	Douglas M. Pravda	Jonathan N. Axelrod Elizabeth T. Bangs Marios V. Broustas	Daniel C. Allen
1995	122	Andrew L. Wright	Sarah E. Scrogin	Tara H. Arden-Smith	Jane C. Chen
1994	121	Marion B. Gammill	Joe Mathews	Melissa Lee Anna D. Wilde	Young Il Kim
1993	120	Ira E. Stoll	Gady A. Epstein	D. Richard de Silva	Young Jin Lee
1992	119	Julian E. Barnes	Philip P. Pan Maggie S. Tucker		Sameer A. Chishty
1991	118	Rebecca L. Walkowitz	Brian R. Hecht	Madhavi Sunder	Elizabeth S. Hilton
1990	117	Jonathan S. Cohn	Joseph R. Palmore	Matthew M. Hoffman	Michael S. Harwayne
