= Jayavarman =

Jayavarman may refer to:

- Jayavarman, the purported original name of the Buddhist monk Bodhidharma
- King Kaundinya Jayavarman of Funan, d. 514
- Any of the following eight kings of Cambodia:
  - Jayavarman I, ruled c. 657–681
  - Jayavarman II, ruled c. 770–835
  - Jayavarman III, ruled c. 835–877
  - Jayavarman IV, ruled c. 928–941
  - Jayavarman V, ruled c. 968–1001
  - Jayavarman VI, ruled c. 1090–1107
  - Jayavarman VII, ruled 1181–1219
  - Jayavarman VIII, ruled 1243–1295
- Kings of central India:
  - Jayavarman (Chandela dynasty), ruled c. 1110-1120
  - Jayavarman I (Paramara dynasty), ruled c. 1142-43
  - Jayavarman II (Paramara dynasty), ruled c. 1255-1274

== See also ==
- Jai Verma, an Indian writer
- Jay Varma, an Indian physician
