= 1930 Pulitzer Prize =

Awards for journalism and related fields

The following are the Pulitzer Prizes for 1930.

== Journalism awards ==
- Public Service:
  - No award given
- Reporting:
  - Russell Owen of The New York Times, for his reports by radio of the Byrd Antarctic Expedition.
- Correspondence:
  - Leland Stowe of the New York Herald Tribune, for the series of articles covering conferences on reparations and the establishment of the international bank.
- Editorial Writing:
  - No award given

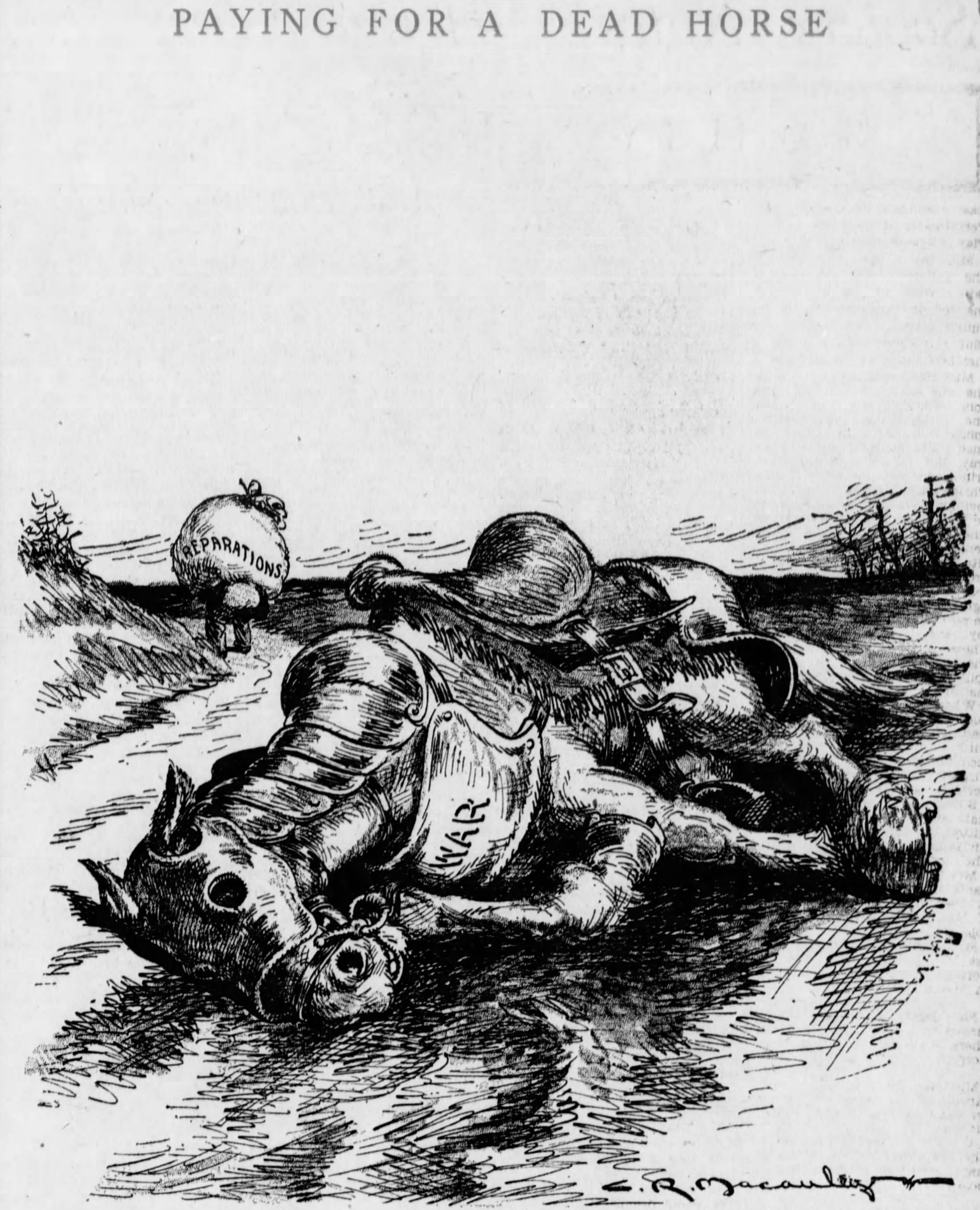
"Paying for a Dead Horse", the winning editorial cartoon

- Editorial Cartooning:
  - Charles R. Macauley of the Brooklyn Daily Eagle, for "Paying for a Dead Horse".
- Special Citations and Awards
  - A special award to William O. Dapping of the Auburn Citizen (New York), for his report on a riot at Auburn Prison for the Associated Press.

== Letters and Drama Awards ==
- Novel:
  - Laughing Boy by Oliver La Farge (Houghton)
- Drama:
  - The Green Pastures by Marc Connelly (Farrar)
- History:
  - The War of Independence by Claude H. Van Tyne (Houghton)
- Biography or Autobiography:
  - The Raven; A Biography of Sam Houston by Marquis James (Bobbs)
- Poetry:
  - Selected Poems by Conrad Aiken (Scribner)
