= Bankable star =

Actors who ensure profits when cast in films

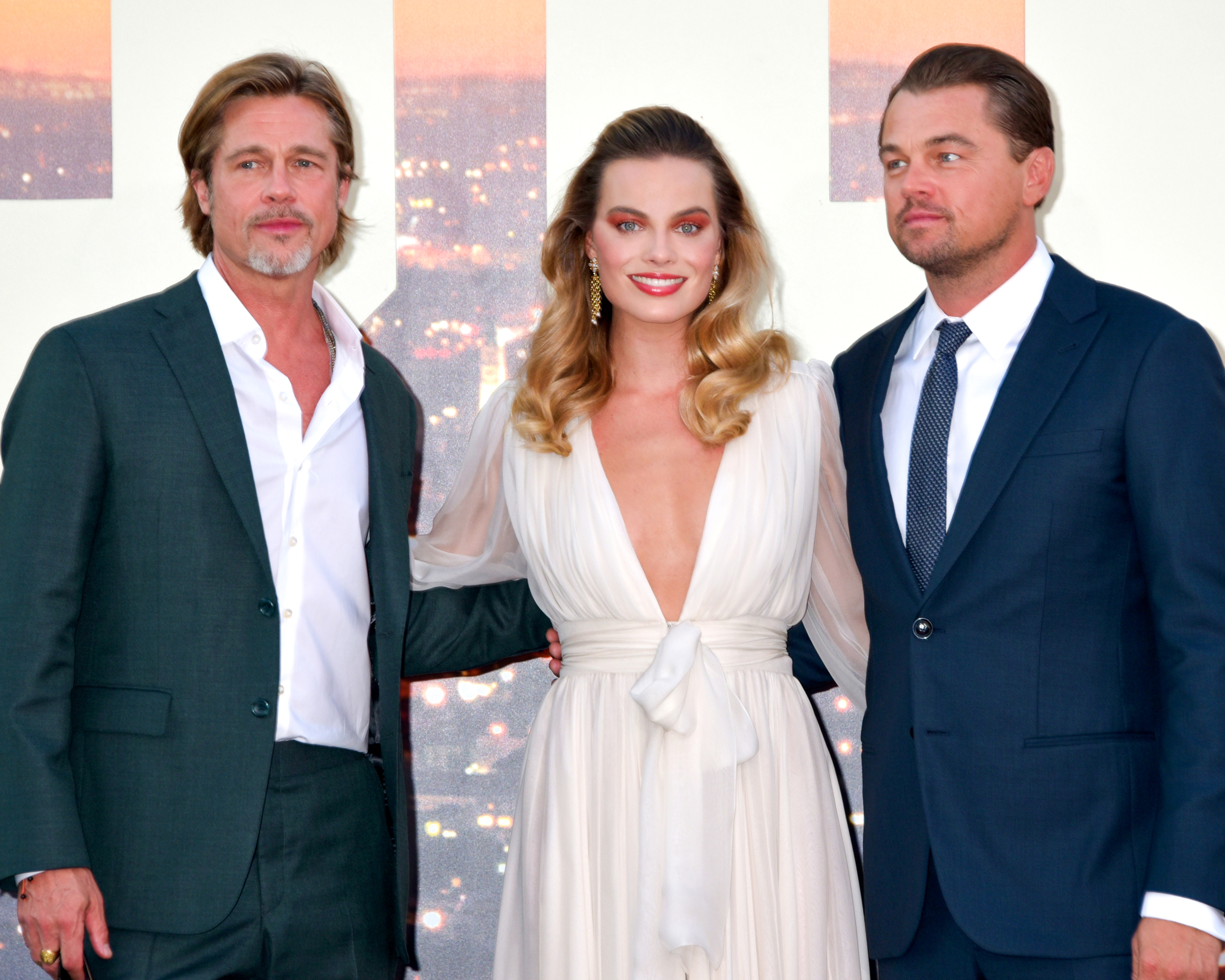
Brad Pitt, Margot Robbie, and Leonardo DiCaprio are current examples of "bankable stars".

In the film industry, a bankable star is a film actor (movie star) "capable of guaranteeing box-office success simply by showing up in a movie". The bankability of an actor includes their films' box office track record, professional demeanor, and other factors. Hiring a bankable star helps a film company to secure investment, distribution, and garner media attention. Some bankable stars have so much star power that even films without a strong concept or "hook"―such as star vehicle films―are feasible to make.

A bankable director is a similar notion.

== Overview ==
Media consultant Blake Harris states that a bankable star is one of the "3 minimum ingredients to any film package," the other two being a successful director and a script or a strong story idea. The involvement of a bankable star in a film gives investors confidence that they will achieve a return on their investments by ensuring that the film is widely distributed and that at least some people will pay to see it (that it will "open").

Harris adds that obtaining a bankable star for a package is not easy because of the dearth of such stars. He states that at any point in time there are no more than "a dozen or so" stars whose mere involvement will ensure that a film will be made.

Analyst Alex Epstein states that bankable stars or, more generally, "bankable elements" are how "hookless" films (films without a compelling concept that makes people interested in them in their own right) get made. He gives Dances with Wolves as an example of a movie: the involvement of Kevin Costner as the bankable star guaranteed that the movie was made. Writer Melissa Robbie concurs, stating that some movies are high-concept (they have what Epstein terms "hooks"), but others are simply star vehicles for bankable stars.

The Hollywood Reporter has published several results of polls for Hollywood's top ten most bankable stars, the most recent three being one in 1999, one in 2002 and the last one in 2006.

The 2002 survey polled "114 executives at both major studios and independent companies, financiers and various industry players from around the world." Voters were asked which stars "did the most to attract financing to a film, ensure its global distribution, and deliver that hugely important opening weekend based on the strength of their good name."

James Ulmer has compared his list of bankable stars, The Ulmer Scale, to a stock market index. His criteria for ranking is based on the name of a star alone being able to get people to movie theaters in the United States as well as the rest of the world. In an August 2010 interview Ulmer described the international movie market as "unfortunately ... pretty sexist"; how a woman's name alone cannot sell a movie, and how female stars are only bankable when cast with a male star or in ensemble movies.

Antipov and Pokryshevskaya (2016) proposed an approach that allows calculating the power of actors and directors of thousands of movies using a spreadsheet. The proposed bankability metric was validated to be a significant predictor of box office sales.

== Lists of most bankable stars ==
=== The Hollywood Reporter ===
These are the top 10 lists of the most bankable stars, with their scores, as published by The Hollywood Reporter.

==== 1999 ====
1. Tom Cruise
2. Mel Gibson
3. Tom Hanks
4. Harrison Ford
5. Jim Carrey
6. Leonardo DiCaprio
7. John Travolta
8. Julia Roberts
9. Robin Williams
10. Brad Pitt

==== 2002 ====
1. Tom Cruise (100.00)
2. Tom Hanks (100.00)
3. Julia Roberts (100.00)
4. Mel Gibson (98.68)
5. Jim Carrey (98.46)
6. George Clooney (95.18)
7. Russell Crowe (94.74)
8. Harrison Ford (94.74)
9. Jodie Foster (94.30)
10. Brad Pitt (92.98)

==== 2006 ====
1. Tom Cruise
2. Tom Hanks
3. Jim Carrey
4. George Clooney
5. Russell Crowe
6. Johnny Depp
7. Nicole Kidman
8. Jude Law
9. Brad Pitt
10. Julia Roberts

=== Ulmer scale ===
The list was created by veteran entertainment journalist James Ulmer, who developed a 100-point method to quantify a star's value to a film production, in terms of getting a movie financed and the cameras rolling. The Ulmer scale also takes into account an actor's history (box office successes vs. failures), versatility, professional demeanor, and ability and willingness to travel and promote movies.

==== 2009 ====
The Top 10 list as of 2009 (in order of Ulmer scale's star power or bankable value):

1. Will Smith
2. Johnny Depp
3. Brad Pitt
4. Tom Hanks
5. George Clooney
6. Will Ferrell
7. Reese Witherspoon
8. Nicolas Cage
9. Leonardo DiCaprio
10. Russell Crowe

=== Forbes' annual highest-paid actors ===
Although the Forbes list does not specifically aim to measure bankability, it may indirectly give some indication. Forbes ranks the top-earning actors, taking into account all sources of income, such as brand endorsements and sponsorship deals.

==== 2023–present ====
These are the top 10 highest-paid actors in 2023, as reported in Forbes Magazine.

1. Adam Sandler
2. Margot Robbie
3. Tom Cruise
4. Ryan Gosling
5. Matt Damon
6. Jennifer Aniston
7. Leonardo DiCaprio
8. Jason Statham
9. Kevin Hart
10. Denzel Washington

== See also ==
- A-list
- Celebrity
- Movie star
- Leading actor
- Superstar
- Four Dan Actresses
- Four Heavenly Kings (Hong Kong)
- Top Ten Money Making Stars Poll
