= Chaudhary Charan Singh University =

Public state university in Uttar Pradesh, India

Coordinates: 28.9700°N 77.7415°E

- Official Seal
- Former name: Meerut University
- Motto in English: Where that supreme treasure of Truth resides
- Type: State university
- Established: 1965 (61 years ago)
- Accreditation: NAAC A++
- Affiliations: UGC
- Chancellor: Governor of Uttar Pradesh
- Vice-Chancellor: Sangeeta Shukla
- Location: Meerut, Uttar Pradesh, India
- Campus: Urban
- Website: ccsuniversity.ac.in

Chaudhary Charan Singh University (CCS University), formerly Meerut University, is a public state university located in Meerut, Uttar Pradesh, India. The university was established in 1965. It was later renamed to its current name after Chaudhary Charan Singh, former Prime minister of India. The university celebrated its silver jubilee in 1991.

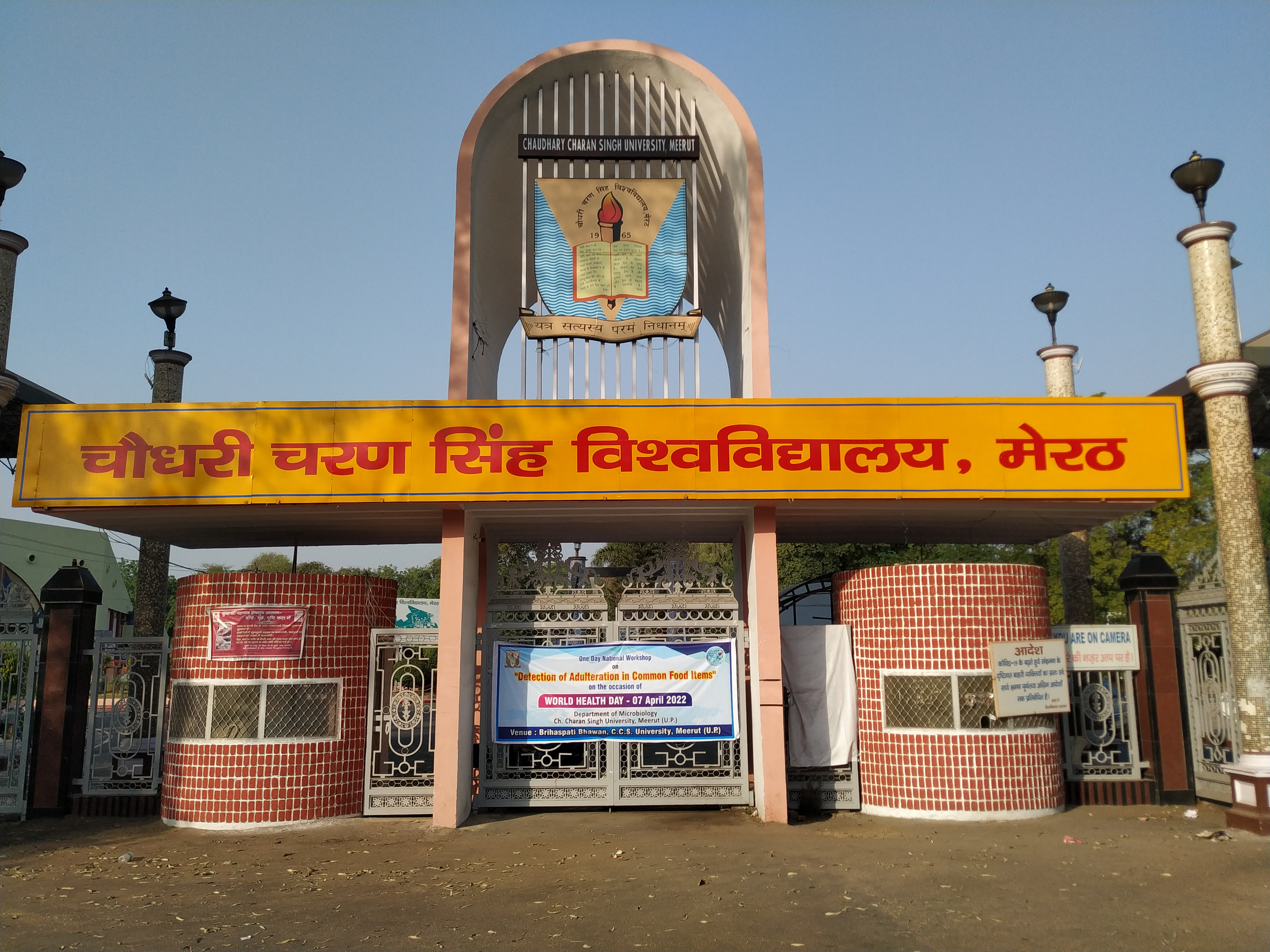
Chaudhary Charan Singh University, Meerut, Uttar Pradesh, India

== History ==
The Chaudhary Charan Singh University was established in the year 1965 as Meerut University by the government of Uttar Pradesh as a public state university to meet the growing demand in higher education in the western region of the state.

At the time of its establishment, the university was entrusted with the responsibility of affilating colleges across several districts of Western Uttar Pradesh.Over the years, the university has grown into one of the largest affilating university in the region, serving hundreds of colleges and a large student population.

In 1988, the Meerut University was renamed as Chaudhary Charan Singh University in honour of Shri Charan Singh, the fifth Prime Minister of India and a prominent advocate of farmer's right and rural development. The renaming recognised his significant contribution to Indian agriculture, public policy and education.

The university celebrated its silver jubilee in 1991, making 25 years of academic excellence and institutional growth.

== Notable alumni ==
- Mayawati, former Chief Minister of Uttar Pradesh
- Murli Manohar Joshi, former Union Human Resources & Development Minister, Padma Vibushan Awardee, Founding member of BJP
- Rekha Gupta, 9th Chief Minister of Delhi
- Nand Kishor Gurjar, Member of the Uttar Pradesh Legislative Assembly
- Ramesh Bidhuri, Member of Lok Sabha
- Sushil Kumar, wrestler
- K. C. Tyagi, former Member of Parliament
- Kamal Davar, Indian Army officer, first director general of the Defence Intelligence Agency
- Jai Verma, Nottingham-based poet and advocate of Hindi language and culture
- Alka Tomar, wrestler
- Satyadev Prasad, archer
- Divya Kakran, wrestler
- Rajeev Kumar Varshney, Agricultural scientist
- Karim Uddin Barbhuiya, businessman and politician
- Raja Iqbal Singh, BJP politician
- Rakesh Tikait, national spokesperson of the Bharatiya Kisan Union
- Sanjeev Tyagi, film and television actor
- Nayab Singh Saini, Chief Minister of Haryana
- Satya Pal Singh, former Member of Lok Sabha and Chancellor of Gurukul Kangri University in Haridwar
