= Motoko Rich =

American journalist

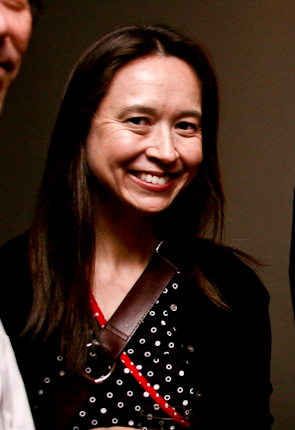
- Motoko Rich in 2011
- Born: 1969 (age 56–57)
- Education: Yale University (BA); University of Cambridge (MA)
- Occupation: Journalist
- Employer: The New York Times
- Spouse: Mark Topping (m. 2003)

Motoko Rich is a Japanese-American journalist who is the current Rome bureau chief for The New York Times as of 2025 leading coverage of Italy, the Vatican and Greece. She was previously the Tokyo bureau chief from 2016 to 2024, where she covered Japanese politics, society, gender, culture, security and the arts, as well as news and features on the Korean Peninsula.

== Early life and education ==
Rich was born to Junko and Peter Rich of Petaluma, California. She grew up in New Jersey, Tokyo, and Northern California and attended Casa Grande High School. She majored in English literature at Yale University and graduated summa cum laude with a Bachelor of Arts degree and received a master's degree in English from the University of Cambridge.

== Career ==
Rich worked as a reporter for The Financial Times in London. She then moved to Atlanta and worked for The Wall Street Journal, eventually moving to New York City. In 2003, she joined The New York Times, where she covered a broad range of topics including real estate, the economy, books and education.

In 2016, Rich succeeded Martin Fackler as the Tokyo bureau chief for The New York Times. She has reported on various issues affecting Japan and the region, such as the 2020 Summer Olympics, the COVID-19 pandemic, the Abdication of Emperor Akihito, the assassination of Shinzo Abe, North Korea–United States relations, South Korea–Japan relationships, and China–Japan relations.

In 2025 she succeeded Jason Horowitz as bureau chief for Rome after eight years in Tokyo. Javier C. Hernández succeeded her as the next Tokyo bureau chief.

She is a co-winner of the Gerald Loeb Award for Images/Graphics/Interactives (2016–2018).
