= William O. Dapping =

American journalist (1880–1969)

- Born: William Osbourne Dapping; June 21, 1880; New York City, New York, U.S.
- Died: August 1, 1969 (aged 89); Auburn, New York, U.S.
- Education: Harvard University
- Occupation: Journalist
- Employer: The Auburn Citizen
- Awards: Pulitzer Prize, 1930

William Osbourne Dapping (June 21, 1880 – August 1, 1969) was an American journalist for The Auburn Citizen from 1905 to 1960. With The Auburn Citizen, Dapping began as a reporter before his promotion to managing editor in 1917. While holding the position, Dapping received a special award in the 1930 Pulitzer Prizes for his coverage of the 1929 Auburn State Prison riot. Dapping remained in his editing role with The Auburn Citizen until he retired in 1960. Outside of journalism, Dapping was part of the United States Electoral College between 1932 and 1964.

== Early life and education ==
On June 21, 1880, Dapping was born in New York City, New York. Growing up, Dapping joined the George Junior Republic when he was fifteen years old. For his post-secondary education, Dapping graduated from Harvard University with a Bachelor of Arts in 1905.

== Career ==
Dapping began his reporting career during university with The Harvard Crimson. After joining The Auburn Citizen in 1905 as a reporter, Dapping held multiple editing positions until his promotion to managing editor in 1917. During his tenure as managing editor, Dapping received a special award in the 1930 Pulitzer Prizes for his coverage of the 1929 Auburn State Prison riot. Dapping remained with The Auburn Citizen in his managing position until his 1960 retirement. Apart from journalism, Dapping was part of the United States Electoral College in consecutive presidential elections from 1932 to 1964. He also held executive roles with the Auburn Publishing Company between 1938 and 1960.

A collection of Dapping's personal papers is held at the Special Collections Research Center of Syracuse University libraries.

== Personal life ==
On August 1, 1969, Dapping died in Auburn, New York. He was married and had no children.
