= Eric Newcomer =

American journalist

Eric Paul Newcomer
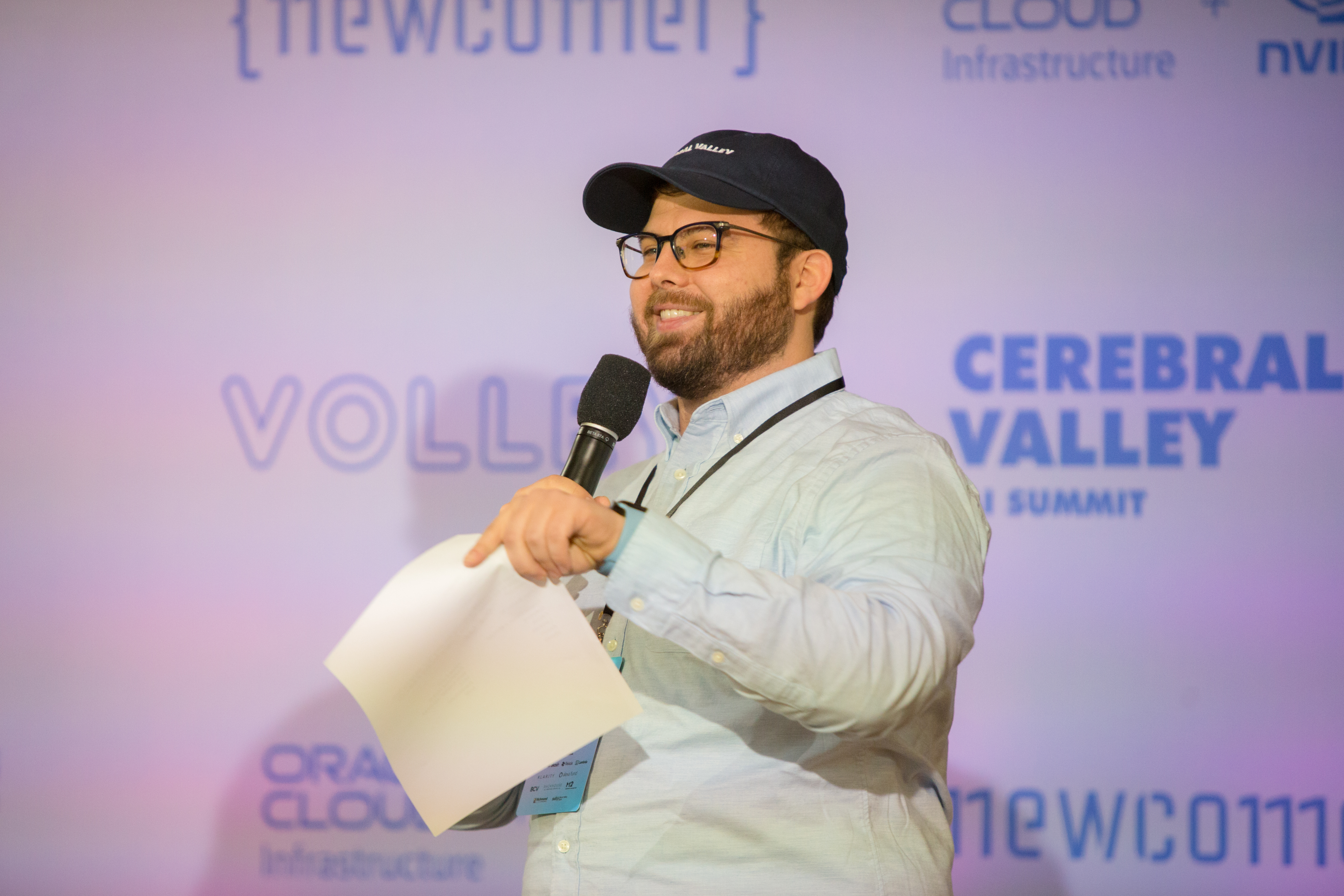
- Born: September 7, 1989 (age 36); York, Pennsylvania
- Education: Harvard University (AB)
- Occupation: Journalist
- Spouse: Sara Joe Wolansky (m. 2023)

Substack information
- Newsletter: Newcomer
- Topics: Technology; Silicon Valley; Venture capital
- Subscribers: 102,000 (June 2025)

Eric Newcomer (born September 7, 1989) is an American journalist known for reporting on Silicon Valley and the startup industry. He is the founder of Newcomer, a media outlet that covers startups and venture capital, which he launched in 2020.

== Personal life and education ==
Newcomer was born in York, Pennsylvania, and raised in Macon, Georgia. After graduating from Central High School in 2008, he attended Harvard University, where he graduated in 2012 with a Bachelor of Arts degree in Philosophy. At Harvard, he served as associate managing editor for The Harvard Crimson and won awards for investigative reporting on a four-part series related to sexual assault at the university.

In 2023, Newcomer married Sara Joe Wolansky, a multimedia journalist who he met while at Harvard. The two worked together at The Crimson.

== Career ==
While at Harvard, Newcomer had internships at the South Florida Sun-Sentinel and the Tampa Bay Times. Later, he worked as a James Reston Reporting Fellow for The New York Times. He was the first employee at The Information, joining as a reporter in 2013.

In 2014 Newcomer joined Bloomberg LP as a technology reporter. While at Bloomberg, he published an article about then-Uber CEO Travis Kalanick that included a video of Kalanick arguing with an Uber driver. The article contributed to Kalanick’s resignation as CEO of Uber.

=== Newcomer ===
In October 2020, he launched his own venture capital newsletter, Newcomer. As of July 2022, Newcomer had over 1,900 paying subscribers. In 2023, Newcomer was one of many Substack publishers who publicly announced personal investments in the company as a show of support. He also runs a weekly podcast containing top thought leaders in startups and venture capital. Past speakers on the podcast have included Kara Swisher and Emad Mostaque. In 2024, Newcomer announced that his company had raised $2 million in revenue over the previous year.

Under the Newcomer umbrella, Newcomer has hosted a series of invite-only summits for technology leaders and investors in San Francisco, New York, and London. The summits, which often feature prominent technology executives including Dario and Daniela Amodei and Alexandr Wang, have helped popularize the nickname "Cerebral Valley" for the neighborhood of Hayes Valley, San Francisco. At the inaugural Cerebral Valley AI Summit in 2023, Databricks CEO Ali Ghodsi first met MosaicML CEO Naveen Rao, leading to Databricks' eventual acquisition of MosaicML for $1.3 billion.
