= Anton Troianovski =

Soviet-born American journalist

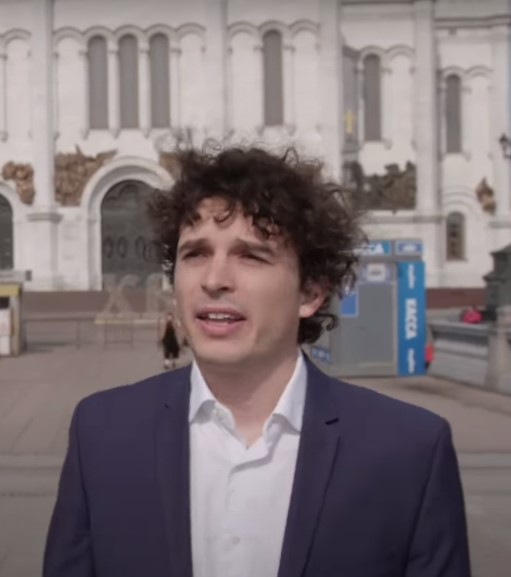
- Born: May 30, 1985 (age 41); Moscow, Soviet Union
- Education: Harvard University (BA)
- Employer: The New York Times
- Awards: Pulitzer Prize for Explanatory Reporting (2020)

Anton Sergeyevich Troianovski (Russian: Антон Сергеевич Трояновский; born 8 December 1985) is a Soviet-born American journalist. He is a foreign policy reporter and the former Moscow bureau chief for The New York Times and the former Moscow bureau chief for The Washington Post.

== Early life and education ==
Anton Troianovski was born on 8 December 1985 in Moscow, Soviet Union, into a family of biologists. His father is Sergey Markovich Troianovski, son of the Soviet film director and cameraman Mark Troianovski. In 1990, Troianovski's family moved to Heidelberg, Germany, and in 1994 they moved to the United States.

Troianovski attended Harvard University, where he graduated with a bachelor's degree in social studies in 2008. While at Harvard he was associate managing editor of The Harvard Crimson, working with his future New York Times colleague Javier Hernández, who was the paper's managing editor.

== Career ==
His career began as a photographer for the Webster-Kirkwood Times and the Suburban Journals group in Missouri, US. In 2007, Troianovski received a travel grant from the Davis Center for Russian and Eurasian Studies for his topic "The New Generation of Russian Journalists after the Fall of Communism". He was an intern at The New Republic, Associated Press and The Washington Post.

From 2008 to 2017 he worked for The Wall Street Journal, where he covered topics related to real estate, telecommunications, and the economy in Washington and New York City. From 2013 to 2017 he was a correspondent in Berlin, Germany.

From January 2018 to July 2019, he worked as the Moscow bureau chief for The Washington Post, where he was part of The Post's 2020 Pulitzer Prize-winning team for its climate change reporting series.

On 27 June 2019, he joined The New York Times, where he was the Moscow bureau chief from January 2021 to late 2025. He was one of the first foreign journalists who covered the events during the 2020 Nagorno-Karabakh war. Troianovski returned to the United States in late 2025 to become a foreign policy reporter for the Times.
