= Javier C. Hernández =

American journalist

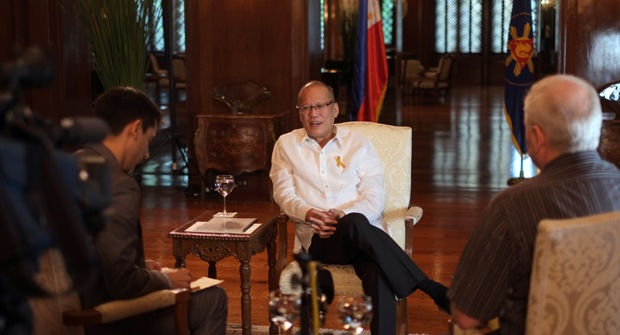
- Hernandez (left) interviewing Benigno Aquino III in 2016
- Born: c. 1986
- Education: Harvard University (AB)
- Occupation: Journalist
- Years active: 2008–present
- Employer: The New York Times
- Awards: 2021 Pulitzer Prize in Public Service

Javier C. Hernandez is an American journalist for The New York Times. Since 2025, he has been the paper's Tokyo bureau chief. He was part of a reporting team that received the 2021 Pulitzer Prize for Public Service for his coverage of the COVID-19 pandemic in China.

== Early life and education ==
Hernandez was born to Honduran parents and raised in Eugene, Oregon. He obtained his undergraduate degree from Harvard University in 2008, where he was the managing editor of The Harvard Crimson. While at The Crimson, Hernandez worked with Anton Troianovski, who was an associate managing editor with Hernandez. The two later became bureau chiefs at The New York Times.

== Career ==
After graduating from Harvard, Hernandez joined the Times, where he covered politics and education. In 2015, Hernandez moved to China, where he began covering the country for the Times. While in China, Hernandez covered the 2019–2020 Hong Kong protests. Hernandez began covering the emergence of COVID-19 in China in 2020, before relocating to Taiwan after he was expelled by the Chinese government. Hernandez later won a Pulitzer Prize for his coverage of the pandemic. In 2021, Hernandez became the Times' classical music and dance reporter. He broke the news of the discovery of Chopin's Waltz in A minor in 2024. He won an award from the Los Angeles Press Club for his investigation of Anna Netrebko's ties to Vladimir Putin in the aftermath of the Russian invasion of Ukraine.

In 2025, The New York Times announced that Hernandez would be the paper's next Tokyo bureau chief, succeeding Motoko Rich.
