= Jai Verma =

Indian-born British writer (1950–2025)

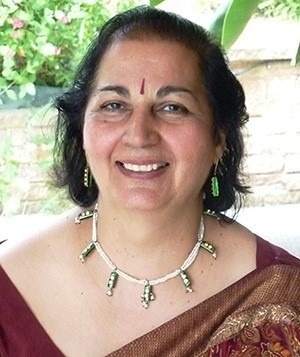
- Verma, c. 2012
- Born: March 1950; Meerut, Uttar Pradesh, India
- Died: 23 April 2025 (aged 75)
- Awards: Adharshila Magazine Award 2016, Lord Mayor's Award 2017

Academic background
- Education: Meerut University

Academic work
- Notable works: Oasis Poems 2003, Kavya Tarang 2006, Saat Qadam

Jai Verma (March 1950 – 23 April 2025) was an Indian-born Hindi writer, educationalist, poet and advocate of Hindi language and culture.

== Early life ==
Jai Verma was born in Jiwana, Meerut, Uttar Pradesh, India in March 1950, the eldest of five children. After her primary education in Rudrapur, Nainital; she received a BA in English Literature, Economics, and Drawing and Painting from Meerut University.

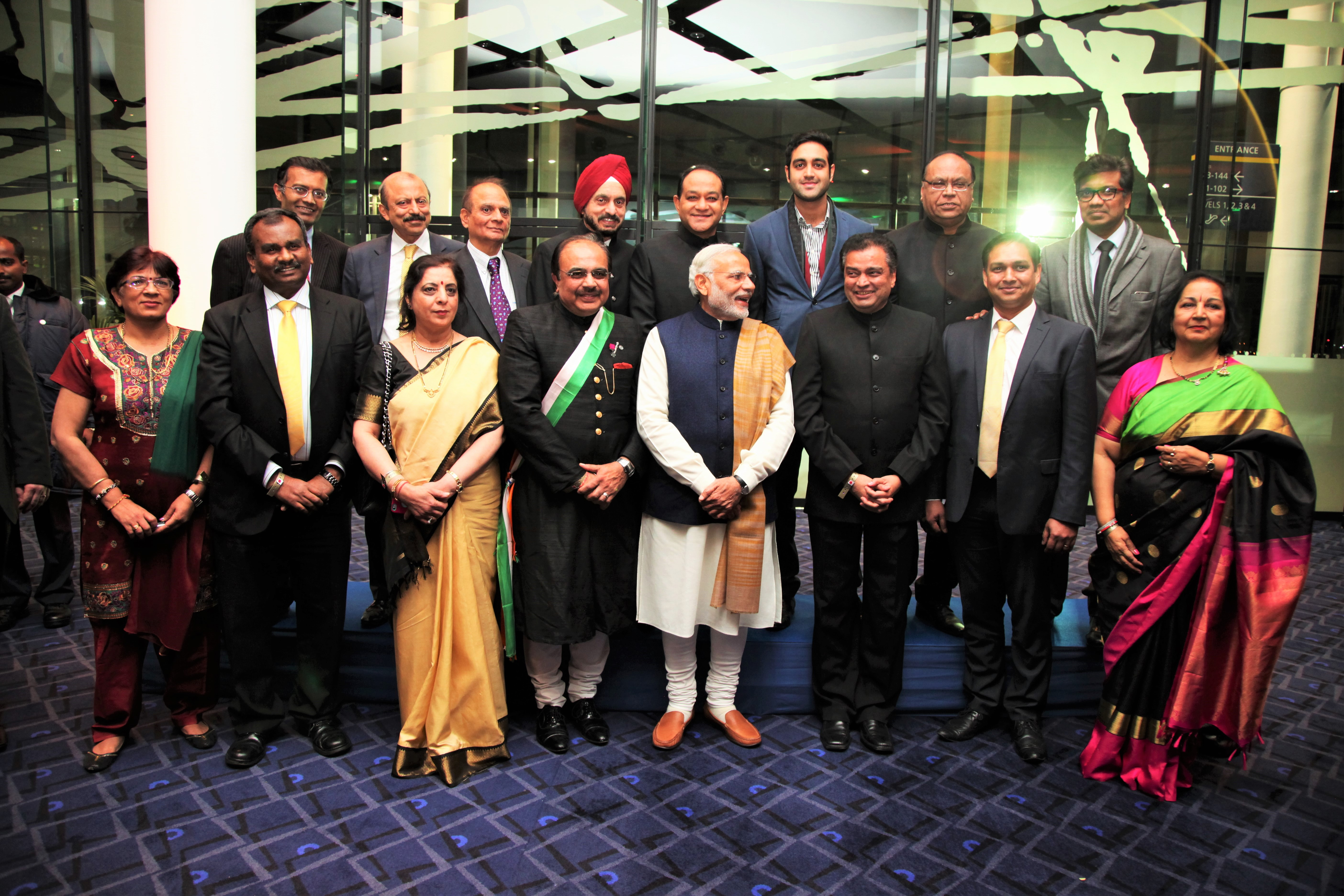
Jai Verma (far right) meets with Indian Prime Minister N Modi

She moved to Gateshead, Tyneside, England on Gandhi's birthday: 2 October, in 1971. In 1976, she moved to Nottingham, UK, where she lived until her death.

== Career ==
Verma contributed to the translation and adaptation of over thirty books into Hindi during her career as a Hindi teacher in Nottingham. In the Eighties, she worked as the Language Coordinator at the Nottingham Language Centre. She taught Hindi professionally from 1976 to 1991 at Nottingham's Kala Niketan School. After settling in Nottingham in 1976, she began to become more involved in Hindi arts and culture, particularly in the field of poetry.

Throughout this period, her poetry and articles were published in a variety of magazines and newspapers worldwide (predominantly the UK, USA, India, and Canada). This in turn led to her poetry being accepted into several anthologies. She was featured in an article in the Indian Council of Cultural Relations special publication गगनान्चल 1857 के 150 वर्ष पर विशेषांक अप्रैल-सितम्बर 2006 (Gagnanchal, 1857: 150 Year Special Edition, April–September 2006) as one of the important people outside of India for promoting Hindi culture. A member of the Nottingham Asian Arts Council since 1995, she was a founder members of a poetry group for multi-lingual poets and fans of multilingual, South Asian poetry in 2003 named Gitanjali Multilingual Literary Circle Trent (inspired by the Gitanjali group in the West Midlands. to promote and develop multilingual poetry outside of India. She remains the chairperson of the group to this day. The group changed its name in 2011 to Kavya Rang (Colours of Poetry). She has given talks and recitals at World Hindi Conferences / ICOSOL conferences across the world, including Johannesburg, Moscow, Alighar, Budapest, New York; Toronto; Washington DC, Ujjain, Delhi, Meerut, Lucknow, Kurukshetra; and many other places.

She presented a weekly BBC Radio Nottingham programme 'Navrang' for several months during the 1980s. This was a dedicated programme for the local South Asian diaspora.

As a mature student, she studied for an advanced diploma in Practice Management; and a post-graduate in Service Management at Nottingham Trent University, graduating in 1994.

From 1989 to 2014, she was a practice manager at a Nottingham NHS surgery.

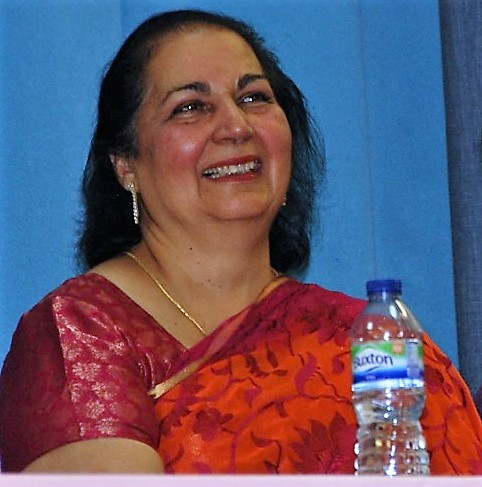
Jai at Nottingham Festival of Words, 2014

She has promoted and organised the Indian poetic performance art of Kavi Sammelan, setting up regular events as since 2004. This has developed into the International Kavi Sammelan events, set up under the banner of Kavya Rang, held in her home city of Nottingham, UK, and attracting internationally renowned guests.

Her story, Gulmohar, originally published in the magazine Pravasi Duniya, was selected to be part of the Pravasi (diaspora) Hindi Sait BA curriculum reading list in 2015 by the University Grants Commission (UGC). Her poem क्यों चाहूँ नया जन्म क्यों चाहहँ मोक्ष (Why Should I Seek New Birth or Nirvana?) was included in the Maharashtra secondary Medium / High Education Committee (महाराष्ट्र राज्य माद्यमिक व उच्च माद्यमिक शिक्षण मंडल) curriculum for 2015. She is included in the MA Hindi syllabus as a परिचय (introduction) to Pravasi writers, at CCS University, Meerut.

In June 2016, Jai Verma was presented with the Adharshila Magazine Award, for "prominence in the field of literature"; her writing helping Hindi become a world language. This Mahadevi Verma Samman was awarded alongside an invite to chair the meeting in Paris.

Verma was an active member of Nottingham Asian Arts Council, joining the committee in 1990, and a full board member from 2013. She was on the board of the Nottingham Festival of Words 2016, developing the festival's theme of discovering and strengthening links between Nottingham and India.

She was active in arranging Indian poets visit Nottingham for annual events, and facilitating cultural exchange.

Verma was an active member of the working group that saw Nottingham designated a UNESCO City of Literature on 11 December 2015, and continued to support and work with the City of Literature on projects following the award.

She was awarded the Lord Mayor's Award in March 2017 from the Lord Mayor of Nottingham, for her services in promoting Nottingham internationally.

From 2018 she spent winters speaking in India, delivering lectures at, amongst others, Gandhi Nagar Ahmedabad; Meerut University; Vigyan Bhaven; Jaipur University.

== Charitable work ==
Verma was involved in several voluntary organisations and charitable campaigns over the years. She was instrumental in setting up a primary school library in India. She actively supported a project for the Triputi Eye Hospital and worked with the India League, Nottingham to provide funds for local and overseas charities. She raised emergency relief funds for the Asian tsunami and other natural disasters.

== Personal life and death ==
Verma was for many years an accomplished Badminton teacher, tutoring the sport in adult education. She was married with two children and three grandchildren. Verma enjoyed Indian vegetarian cooking, golf, bridge, and spending time with family and friends. She died after a short illness on 23 April 2025, at the age of 75.

== Publications ==
- Oasis Poems 2003 (anthology)
- Gitanjali poems From East & West 2003 (anthology)
- Kavya Tarang 2006, Gitanjali Multilingual Literary Circle (anthology)
- Srijangatha online publication ‘Yanha Se Wanha Tak’ (anthology)
- Anjali Women Poèmes (anthology)
- Suraj Ki Solah Kirne (anthology)
- Poetry book ‘Sahyatri Hain Hum’ published in December 2008 (editor)
- Poems /stories/articles in magazines in UK. India, USA and Canada
- Colours of Poetry (anthology, editor) 2014
- Ramnika Gupta Foundation Pravasi Hindi Women Writers (anthology, short story) 2015
- Nasera Sharma Collection (Anthology, short story) 2015
- Saat Kadam / Seven Steps (Short Stories) 2017
