= Ivan Levingston =

American journalist

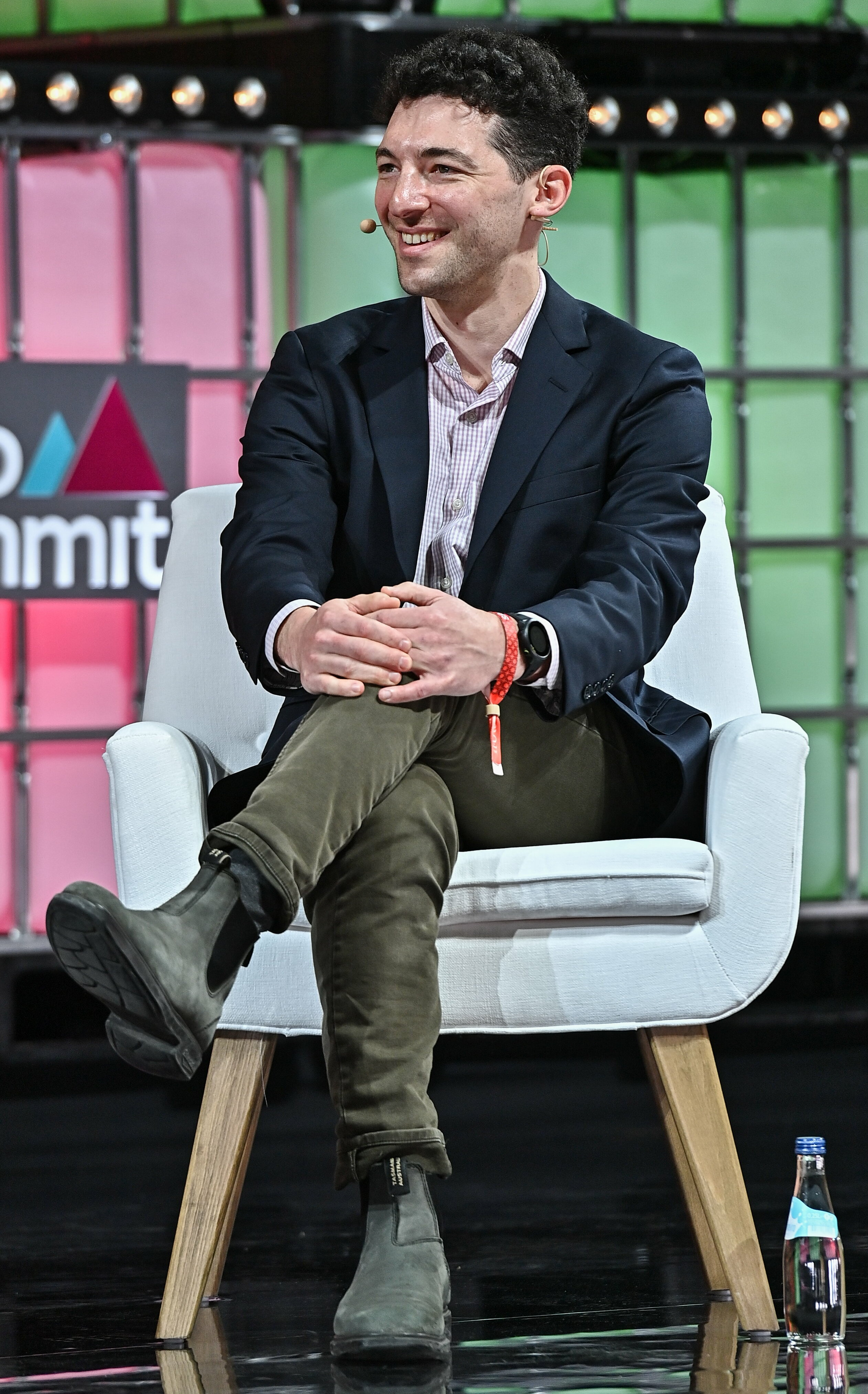
- Levingston in 2022
- Born: Ivan Levingston; November 19, 1994 (age 30); New York City
- Education: Barrack Hebrew Academy; Harvard University (BA)

Ivan Levingston (born November 19, 1994) is an American journalist and a reporter for the Financial Times based in London, England. He was previously at Bloomberg News. At Bloomberg, he was based in Israel and covered the country's government and technology sector. He later was based in London and covered European technology for Bloomberg.

== Early life ==
Levingston was born in New York City and grew up in Mount Airy, Philadelphia. He is a graduate of both Jack M. Barrack Hebrew Academy and Harvard University.

== Career ==
At Harvard, Levingston served as the Associate Managing Editor of The Harvard Crimson. He later worked as an intern at Roll Call and as a breaking news reporter at CNBC.

In 2017, he was hired by Bloomberg News to serve as a reporter in both Boston and New York. There he covered asset management, hedge funds, and university endowments. He moved to Israel in 2018 to cover stories involving the Israeli government and economy for Bloomberg. In August 2020, Levingston reported for Bloomberg on the Abraham Accords and was aboard the first commercial Israeli aircraft to cross through either Saudi Arabian airspace or to land in the United Arab Emirates.

Levingston shifted to covering European technology in April 2021 and is now based in England.

Levingston joined the Financial Times in 2022.
