= Adam Perlman =

American writer, director, producer

- Education: Undergraduate: Harvard University; Postgraduate: New York University Law School
- Known for: Billions (TV series); The Good Wife

A headshot of Adam R. Perlman

Adam Ross Perlman is an American television and film writer, director, and producer. Perlman was a writer and executive producer of the Showtime television series Billions, as well as a writer on television series including The Good Wife, State of Affairs, and The Newsroom.

== Early life ==
Perlman attended Harvard, where he was an editor of The Crimson, and then went on to graduate from NYU Law School. He worked for the Wall Street law firm Cahill Gordon before transitioning to a career in Hollywood.

== Career ==
=== Television ===
Perlman began his television writing career as a writers' assistant on Drop Dead Diva, where he wrote a freelance episode. His first staffing job came on Aaron Sorkin's The Newsroom. He went on to write for the short-lived Katherine Heigl-fronted State of Affairs and the Emmy-winning The Good Wife. His longest tenure was on Showtime's Billions, created by Brian Koppelman and David Levien. Perlman wrote or co-wrote 15 episodes of the series.

Announced development projects that have been shelved previously included an Untitled Robert Downey Jr series at Apple and a presidential assassin anthology series at Peacock, produced by former Meet the Press host Chuck Todd.

=== Film ===
Perlman emerged on the scene winning the 2011 Final Draft Big Break screenplay contest (alongside co-writer Graham Sack). Also with Sack, he wrote the screenplay Septillion to One, which appeared on Franklin Leonard's Blacklist.

Perlman subsequently wrote the feature adaptation of the Rachel Maddow podcast Bag Man, about the investigation and bipartisan removal of criminal vice president Spiro T. Agnew. He developed it with Ben Stiller (director of the project) and Michael Yarvitz (writer of the source podcast).

He directed his own award-winning proof-of-concept short, Unworthy, that has played film festivals across the country.

=== Theatre ===
Perlman began his career in theatre, where he was the dramaturg for the Obie and Drama Desk-winning Transport Group, with whom Perlman developed new musical theatre works including Marcy in the Galaxy, Crossing Brooklyn, and Being Audrey
