= Sydney P. Freedberg =

Sydney P. Freedberg is an American journalist. She has been on the winning team for Pulitzer Prize for Explanatory Reporting three times.

== Education ==
Freedberg received a Bachelor’s in History and Literature (cum laude) from Harvard University. During her time there she was Associate Managing Editor of the Harvard Crimson. She was a John S. Knight Fellow at Stanford University.

== Career ==
Freedberg has worked with a number of prominent news organizations, most recently as a reporter with the International Consortium of Investigative Journalists. Others include: The Miami Herald, The Detroit News, Bloomberg, The Wall Street Journal, the St. Petersburg Times and the Washington Bureau of The E.W. Scripps Company.

In 1994, Freedberg wrote ‘Brother Love: Murder, Money and a Messiah,’ based on her investigation of a self-proclaimed preacher who used his position to control his congregation and even convinced them to commit murder for him. It was published by the Knight Commission on the Information Needs of Communities in a Democracy on July 23, 2013.

In 2006, Freedberg (along with Ronald Henkoff, Jeff Harrington and Connie Humbug) received the Lawrence Minard Editor Award by the UCLA Anderson School of Management in the Beat Writing Category for ‘Risky Business.’

As a reporter with ICIJ in 2018, Freedberg was part of the team behind an award-winning “Implant Files,” a global investigation into the lax regulation of medical devices. In particular, she co-authored an investigation into the business practices of Medtronic, the world’s largest medical device manufacturer.

== Reception ==
According to Peter Schorsch of the St. PetersBlog: “Sydney has worked for some of the nation’s great newspapers, joining the Times in 1998 after 15 years with the Miami Herald (over two stints) and positions as well with the Wall Street Journal and Detroit News. [Her] work is particularly notable for the degree of difficulty in obtaining information about the most complex and under-scrutinized aspects of state government. Through her tenacity, no one has done more for the cause of freedom of information in recent years than Sydney.”

According to Vice President and Washington Bureau Chief for E. W. Scripps, Ellen Weiss: “Sydney has a strong track record of exposing injustices that otherwise may have remained hidden from public view. She is one of the nation's top investigative journalists and a fantastic addition to our national investigative team.”

== Awards ==
Aside from being part of three Pulitzer Prize winning teams, while working at The Detroit News, she received the society's general reporting award for exposing the circumstances surrounding the deaths of several Navy seamen. She received that award together with David L. Ashenfelter.
