= Herbert Dudley Hale Jr. =

American film producer

Herbert Dudley Hale Jr. (1892–1954) was a filmmaker, government official, and soldier. He served in Herbert Hoover's Relief Administration to Russia and made documentaries for federal agencies and the United Nations.

== Early life and education ==
Hale was born in Paris, France to Margaret Marquand Hale and Herbert Dudley Hale. His father was a well-known architect who designed several notable buildings in New York City. Hale later moved with his family to Ipswich, Massachusetts, a coastal town. At the age of ten, Hale sent a letter to St. Nicholas Magazine, a children's magazine, to share his experience living on a family farm (Grove Farm).

Hale graduated from the Morristown School (now Morristown-Beard School) in Morristown, New Jersey in 1910. He then earned a bachelor's degree at Harvard University in Cambridge, Massachusetts in 1914. After graduation, Hale worked as a newspaper writer for the Boston Transcript.

== AFS and military service ==
In 1915, Hale joined the American Field Service (AFS) as an ambulance driver. He served in that role with the French Army in Alsace-Lorraine during World War I from February 1915 to May 1916. Hale was one of the first two AFS volunteers to receive the Croix de guerre for his volunteerism. After his return from France, Hale joined the U.S. Army to serve in the Mexican Expedition. The campaign during the Border War fought the paramilitary forces of Pancho Villa. In 1917, he enlisted as a private with the Army Signal Corps.

After a brief detail to the School of Military Aeronautics at Cornell University, Hale set sail for France in August. He received a detail to the 34th Aero Squadron at the Second Aviation Instruction Center in Tours, France. In the fall, the Army commissioned Hale as a first lieutenant and assigned him to the 88th Aero Squadron. He later served at the Headquarters of the 7th Army Corps in the Army of Occupation.

== Post-war work ==
After World War I, Hale served in the Relief Administration in Russia in 1919. During the 1920s, he worked at the J. Walter Thompson advertising firm in New York City. After moving to Northwest Ohio, he worked at advertising firms in Toledo.

During the 1940s, Hale worked as a film producer and writer for RKO Pathé. He made documentary films for the U.S. State Department, U.S. Air Force, and U.S. Army. Hale also co-produced a film with Jay Bonafield for the Relief and Rehabilitation Administration, a UN agency. During his film career, Hale served as the first president of The Association of Film Writers, a national association of documentary filmmakers. (AFW merged into the Screen Writers Guild (SWG) in 1949. SWG is now a joint affiliation of the Writers Guild of America, West and Writers Guild of America, East.)

== Family and ancestry ==
Hale married Helen Manning (Brown) Hale, a great-great-granddaughter of Cornelius Vanderbilt, on September 11, 1926. They had three children together: Helen Jr., Herbert Dudley III, and Lucy. Hale was a grandson of author Edward Everett Hale, the Chaplain of the United States Senate who penned "The Man Without a Country". Hale also descended from Secretary of State Edward Everett and Nathan Hale, a Revolutionary War soldier.
