= Madhavi Sunder =

American professor of law

Madhavi Sunder (1970 or 1971) is the Frank Sherry Professor of Intellectual Property at Georgetown University Law Center. She is known for her work on intellectual property, law and technology, women's human rights, and international development.

== Education ==
A resident of Northfield, New Jersey, Sunder graduated from Mainland Regional High School in 1988 ranked first in her class of 287 students, where she was the co-editor of the school newspaper.

She attended Harvard University and received her A.B. in 1992. She then moved to Stanford University where she earned a J.D. in 1997. After law school she worked in New York City for the law firm Cleary Gottlieb Steen & Hamilton. From 1998 until 1999 she clerked for Judge Harry Pregerson of the U.S. Court of Appeals for the 9th Circuit.

== Career ==
Sunder was a professor at the University of California, Davis, School of Law from 1999 to 2018. As of 2025 she is the Frank Sherry Professor of Intellectual Property at Georgetown Law.

== Selected publications ==
- Sunder, Madhavi (2002–2003). "Piercing the Veil". Yale Law Journal. 112: 1399. doi:10.2307/3657449. JSTOR 3657449.
- Sunder, Madhavi (2006–2007). "IP3". Stanford Law Review. 59: 257.
- Chander, Anupam; Sunder, Madhavi; Loi, Angelia (2011). Fred Korematsu. Carolina Academic Press. ISBN 978-1-61163-000-8.
- Sunder, Madhavi (June 26, 2012). From Goods to a Good Life. New Haven [Conn.]: Yale University Press. ISBN 978-0-300-14671-4.
- Kavanagh, Matthew M.; Gostin, Lawrence O.; Sunder, Madhavi (July 20, 2021). "Sharing Technology and Vaccine Doses to Address Global Vaccine Inequity and End the COVID-19 Pandemic". JAMA. 326 (3): 219–220. doi:10.1001/jama.2021.10823. ISSN 0098-7484. PMID 34196659.

== Honors and awards ==
In 2006 Sunder was named a Carnegie Scholar.
