= Jessica Lessin =

American journalist (born 1983)

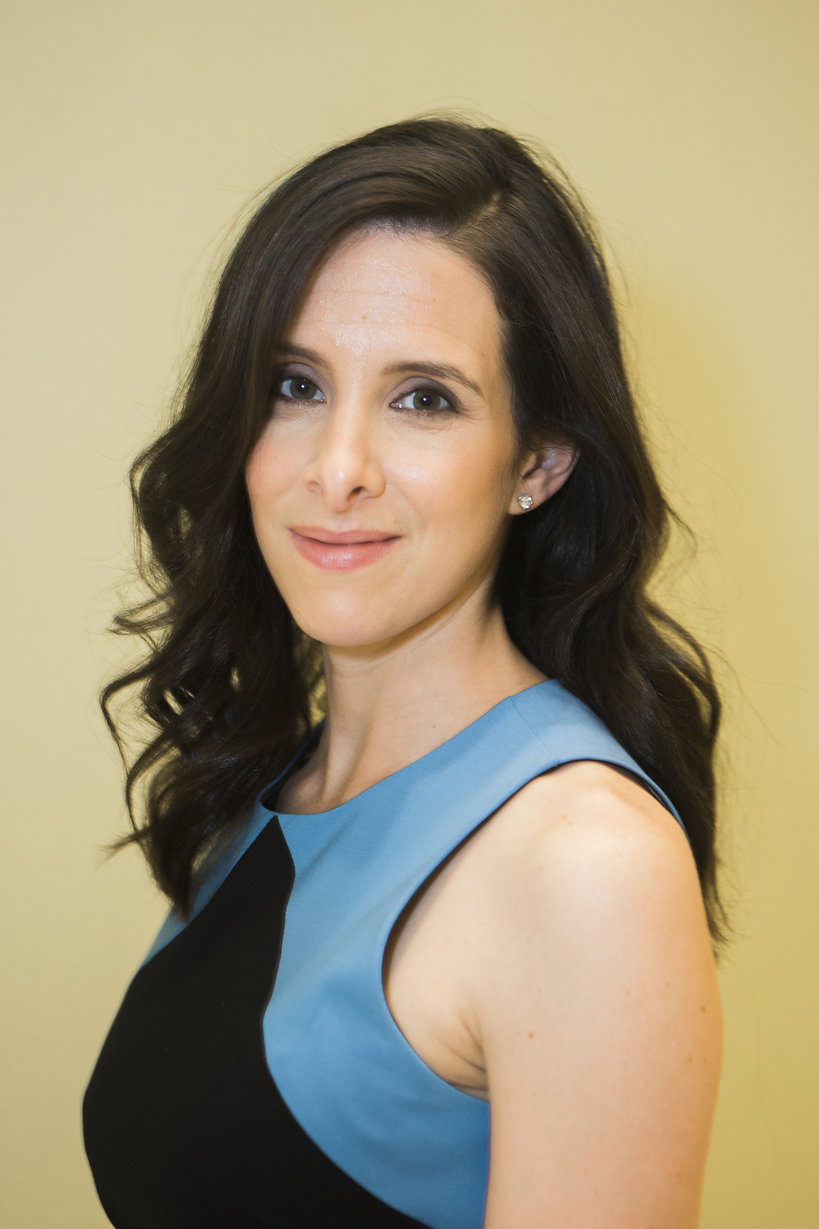
- Born: Jessica Elizabeth Vascellaro; May 11, 1983 (age 43)
- Education: Harvard College (BA)
- Occupations: Journalist, businesswoman
- Spouse: Samuel Lessin (m. 2012)
- Children: 3
- Writing career
- Years active: 2005 - current
- Website: www.theinformation.com

Jessica Elizabeth Lessin (née Vascellaro) is an American journalist who serves as editor-in-chief of the technology website The Information, which she founded in December 2013. Lessin had previously spent eight years at The Wall Street Journal covering the technology and media industries.

== Early life and education ==
Born Jessica Elizabeth Vascellaro, her father, Jerome Vascellaro, is the COO of private equity firm TPG Capital and a trustee of Brown University. She attended New Canaan Country School in Connecticut before enrolling at Harvard University in 2001. She graduated from Harvard College in 2005, magna cum laude and Phi Beta Kappa with a degree in history. While at Harvard, she wrote for The Harvard Crimson and served as an executive editor.

== Career ==
After graduating from Harvard, she completed an internship at the Wall Street Journal and later became a full-time staff member. During her tenure at the publication, Lessin wrote more than a thousand articles and news stories while covering Apple, Google, Yahoo, Facebook, Twitter and other global technology companies. She was part of the team that was a 2012 Pulitzer Finalist for a series on digital privacy. The team won a public service award from the Society of Professional Journalists for the same series. She has appeared on CNBC, NPR, CNN, Charlie Rose, and is a regular speaker at international conferences.

Lessin left the Wall Street Journal in 2013 to establish The Information, an online tech publication based in San Francisco. Lessin was listed as an Influential Woman in Technology by Business Insider in 2014.

By 2017, The Information expanded the markets it covered, opened offices in Hong Kong and New York City, and had grown to 22 staff members. That same year, Lessin announced that The Information was launching a business accelerator aimed at building subscription-based news organizations.

In June 2023, Jessica Lessin together with Sam Lessin, Dave Morin and Brit Morin started a podcast called "More or Less" where they discuss the latest news from Silicon Valley.

== Personal life ==
In 2012, Lessin married Samuel Lessin, a former Facebook VP and current startup founder and investor. Their first child was born in early 2017. Both Lessin and her husband are close friends with Facebook founder and CEO Mark Zuckerberg.
