= Ivan Panin =

American numerologist (1855–1942)

- Born: December 12, 1855; Russia
- Died: October 30, 1942 (aged 86); Aldershot, Ontario
- Citizenship: Russian (1855–73); German (1874–1877); American (1878–1942)
- Writing career
- Genre: Literature
- Notable works: Inspiration Of The Scriptures Scientifically Demonstrated, Pantheism

Ivan Nikolayevich Panin (12 December 1855 – 30 October 1942) was a Russian emigrant to the United States who achieved fame for claiming to discover numerical patterns in the text of the Hebrew and Greek Bible and for his publications about this.

== Biography ==
Ivan Nikolayevitsh Panin, often called the 'father of Bible numerics' (Bible Numerics is considered a part of the more general topic of Biblical numerology) was born in Russia, December 12, 1855. As a young man he participated in a movement to educate the under-classes, a movement which was labeled nihilism by observers from neighboring countries; the members of the movement merely called themselves "revolutionaries". Panin, similar to some other members of the upper class went to the factories to teach the less fortunate. The newly freed serfs (1856 and 1861) were seen by the 'nihilists' as not actually free, but merely being sold into wage slavery, and the solution was education. Neither the government nor the Czar looked kindly upon this.

Finding himself exiled at the age of 18, he emigrated to Germany, where he held citizenship from 1874 to 1877. There, he studied literature and linguistics. At the age of 22 he emigrated to the United States and entered Harvard University, where he spent four years, learning Greek and Hebrew, and graduating in 1882 with a Master of Literary Criticism.

Having already written The Revolutionary Movement in Russia in 1881, he traveled around giving lectures on Russian literature (especially Pushkin, Gogol, Turgenev, and Tolstoy, authors who had contributed to the social upheaval that forced changes in Russia during the mid 1800s).

Karl Sabiers, who wrote Russian Scientist Proves Divine Inspiration of Bible during the last year of Panin's life, wrote:

After his college days he became an outstanding lecturer on the subject of literary criticism... His lectures were delivered in colleges and before exclusive literary clubs in many cities of the United States and Canada. During this time Mr. Panin became well known as a firm agnostic— so well known that when he discarded his agnosticism, and accepted the Christian faith the newspapers carried headlines telling of his conversion.

== Conversion and numerology ==
Panin's conversion occurred in 1890 when his attention was caught by the first chapter of John, in which the article ("the") is used before "God" in one instance, and left out in the next: "and the Word was with the God, and the Word was God." He began to examine the text to see if there was an underlying pattern contributing to this peculiarity. Making parallel lists of verses with and without the article, he decided that there was a system of mathematical relationships underlying the text. This led to his conversion to Christianity, as attested to by his publication in 1891 of The Structure of the Bible: A Proof of the Verbal Inspiration of Scripture.

Until his death in 1942, Ivan Panin labored continuously on searching for numerical patterns in the Hebrew language of the Old Testament and the Greek language of the New Testament, often to the detriment of his health. The most well known pattern, is that Genesis 1:1, is made of 7 words, of 28 letters, and 28=4*7, but he found many many more patterns of 7s. He declared that if these patterns were implemented intentionally by the writers, the collaboration of all writers of the Bible—stretched over many disparate years—would be required, in addition to the condition that each of them be a mathematician of the highest order.

In 1899 Panin sent a letter to the New York Sun challenging his audience to disprove his thesis that the numerical structure of scripture showed its divine origin.

While Panin spoke highly of the edition of Westcott and Hort of the New Testament, he found their textual criticism wanting and was obliged to produce his own critical text. This work, the New Testament in the Original Greek, published in 1934, claims to have reconstructed the lost original version by his techniques.

Based on his edition of the Greek text, Panin translated the New Testament into English, The New Testament from the Greek as Established by Bible Numerics (New Haven, CT, 1914). This was followed in 1935 by a "Second Edition, Revised".

Thereafter, until his death in 1942, he devoted over 50 years of his life to painstakingly exploring his ideas about the numerical structure of the Scriptures, generating over 43,000 hand-penned pages of analysis. A sampling of his discoveries was published, and continue to be published today.

Proponents of his work include well-known authors such as Chuck Missler.

== Criticisms of Panin's claims ==
Critics contend that Panin's own version of the Greek text was 'rigged' to more closely align with the patterns he believed existed, and the text made selective use of alternative readings of Westcott & Hort, rather than a systematic review. Panin's claim to have reconstructed the lost original version by such techniques is identified by critics as a form of circular reasoning since it relies on Panin producing patterns in the text himself.

Panin's claim that the statistical anomalies are proof of divine inspiration has been dismissed by skeptics, who attribute the phenomenon to random chance, and have produced examples of similar patterns occurring in non-Biblical texts.

Another criticism of Panin's patterns is that both he and another author (R. McCormack) published similar numerical findings concerning the beginning of Matthew's Gospel, yet there were differences in the Greek texts used by the two men. This would seem to contradict the idea that all such patterns can be used to validate a single, exact divine text.

== Works ==
=== Published works ===
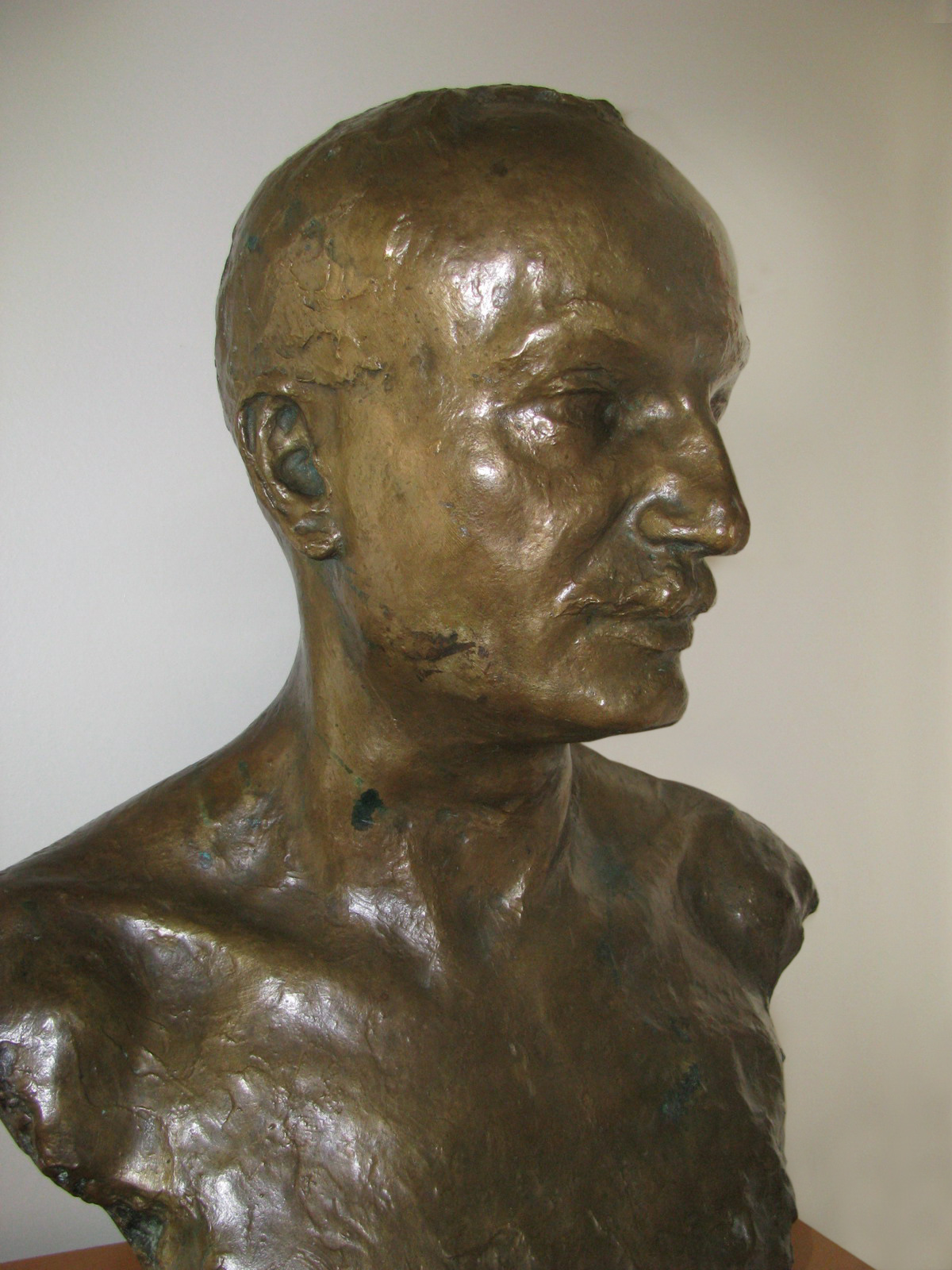
Ivan Panin by Naum Aronson

- 1881: The Revolutionary Movement in Russia
- 1889: Lectures on Russian Literature
- 1891: The Structure of the Bible: A Proof of the Verbal Inspiration of Scripture
- 1899: (Letter to the New York Sun) Inspiration of the Scriptures Scientifically Demonstrated
- 1899: Thoughts
- 1903: Aphorisms
- 1914: The New Testament from the Greek Text as Established by Bible Numerics. New Haven: Bible Numerics Co.
- 1918: The Writings of Ivan Panin
- 1923: Bible Chronology
- 1928: Verbal Inspiration of the Bible Scientifically Demonstrated
- 1934: The Shorter Works of Ivan Panin
- 1934 New Testament in the Original Greek. The Text Established By Means of Bible Numerics
- 1943: Power of the Name
- Bible Numerics
- The Last Twelve Verses Of Mark
- A Holy Challenge For Today – On Revision of the New Testament Text
- Verbal Inspiration Of The Bible Scientifically Demonstrated
- The Inspiration Of The Scriptures Scientifically Demonstrated
- The Inspiration Of The Hebrew Scriptures Scientifically Demonstrated
- The Gospel And The Kingdom – What About Dispensationalism?
- Once In Grace, Always In Grace? – A Review of First Principles

=== Published letters ===
- 1899: Inspiration of the Scriptures Scientifically Demonstrated by Ivan Panin – Letter to the New York Sun
