= Richard Hyland =

Richard Hyland is an American author and legal scholar. He is a law professor at Rutgers Law School, specializing in contract law, particularly the law of the sale of goods and international trade.

In May 2009, Oxford University Press published Gifts: A Study in Comparative Law, Hyland's wide-ranging comparative investigation of the law governing the giving of gifts. This book delves into the historical background of the subject and also covers gift giving under various common law and private law systems.

The book was widely reviewed in the field and garnered plaudits. NJW (Neue Juristische Wochenschrift, New Legal Weekly), the leading magazine for legal theory and practice in Germany, selected Gifts as one of eight law books of the year. In addition to Gifts, Hyland has co-written two textbooks and many articles for scholarly journals.

In addition to his extensive legal education, honors, and experience, Hyland earned a Master of Fine Arts degree in fiction from Columbia University in 2001, has written literary criticism, and is (as of 2019) working on a book about the turbulent years of Harvard in the late 1960s, when he was an undergraduate.

== Books ==
- Hyland, Richard (2012). Gifts: A Study in Comparative Law. Oxford University Press. ISBN 978-0199843480.
- Hyland, Richard; Patterson, Dennis (2006). Hyland and Patterson's The Commercial Sales Transaction, An Introduction to the U.C.C. American Casebook (2nd ed.). West. ISBN 978-0314160461.
- Hyland, Richard; Patterson, Dennis (1999). An Introduction to Commercial Law. American Casebook. West. ISBN 978-0314160461.
