= The Information (website) =

American technology news website

Lessin Media Company
- Industry: Digital media
- Founded: December 2013; 12 years ago
- Founder: Jessica Lessin
- Headquarters: San Francisco
- Number of employees: 60
- Website: www.theinformation.com

The Information, legally the Lessin Media Company, is an American technology industry–focused business publication headquartered in San Francisco. Founded in 2013 by journalist Jessica Lessin, the publication publishes content behind a paywall that allows subscribers access to the site and access to global networking events. Lessin has stated that she aims to "build the next Wall Street Journal over the next 50 years" with the publication.

== History and operations ==
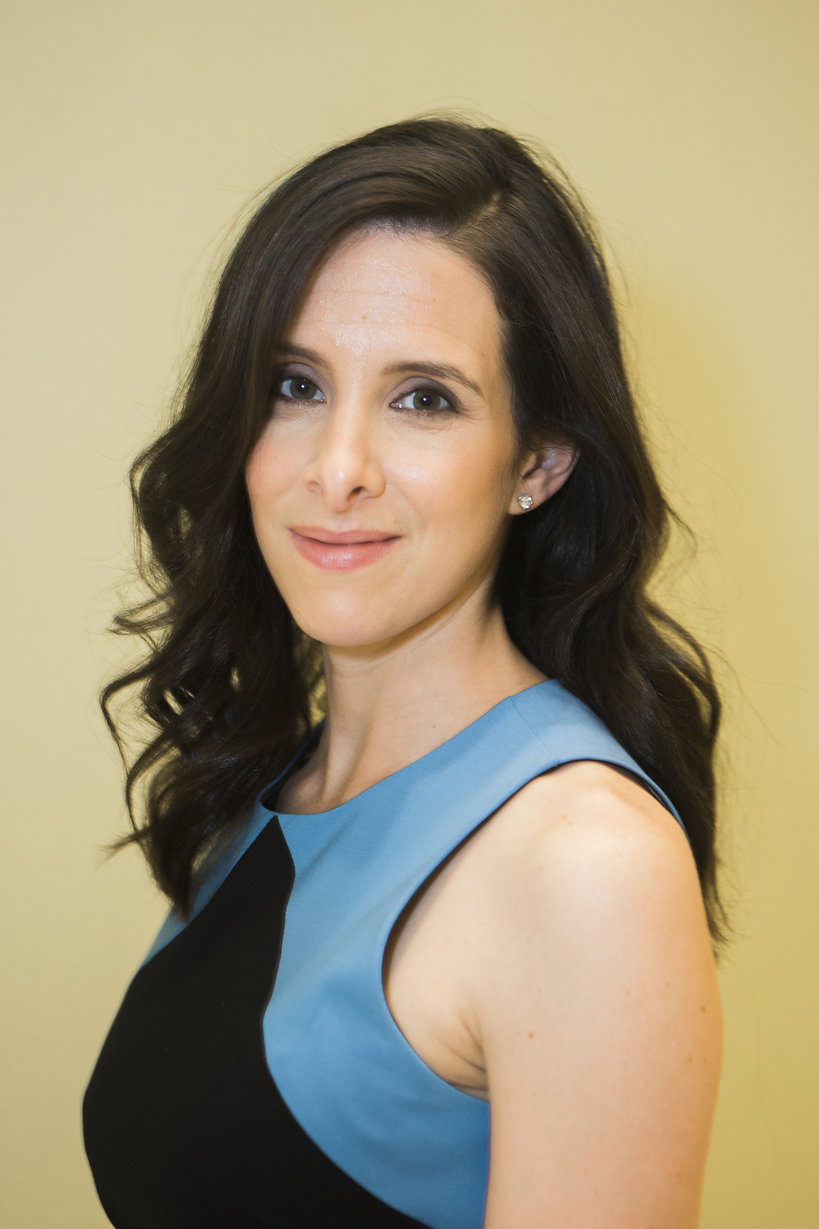
Jessica Lessin founded The Information in December 2013.

Jessica Lessin, a former reporter for The Wall Street Journal, founded The Information as a subscription-based news website marketed to technology-sector executives in December 2013. She hired reporter Eric Newcomer as its first employee in 2014. Lessin later formed an advisory board which included venture capitalist John Doerr, Politico co-founder Jim VandeHei, and ProPublica executive chairman Paul Steiger.

Lessin has stated that she wants The Information to eventually reach the point where it is spending more than either The Wall Street Journal or The New York Times, and stated "Our ambition isn't to build a subscription business — our goal is to build the most impactful news organization for the next century".

In February 2020, the company announced a partnership with Bloomberg Media, enabling customers to purchase a year-long joint bundle. The Financial Times reported in November 2021 that the publication has 225,000 "users", a figure that includes subscribers and individuals who have signed up for newsletters. As of 2022, the publication has 45,000 paid subscribers.

In 2023, the publication launched a new subscription service for charts, proprietary data, and reader surveys. The service is geared towards C-suite professionals, costing $999 annually.

In addition to owning The Information, Lessin Media has invested in other media companies including Semafor and The Ankler.

=== Networking ===
Basic subscriptions for The Information provide readers access to both the publication as well as worldwide networking events. In October 2016, it was announced that a student edition and Investor level would be added to the subscription levels. An Investor subscription includes private monthly conference calls and in-person briefings with the reporting team.

In July 2022, it was reported that Lessin intends for The Information to launch a social networking service for subscribers, stating that platforms like Facebook and LinkedIn have grown too large to be able to curate strong connections.

=== Asia bureau ===
In addition to its San Francisco headquarters, the company operates an Asia bureau headed by Shai Oster in Hong Kong. The company held an international networking event 2016 in Beijing, where annual subscribers met with leaders from Asian companies such as electronics company Xiaomi, venture capital firm Shunwei Capital, and investment management firm Hillhouse Capital Group.

== Content and impact ==
The publication focuses on in-depth, data-driven analysis and exclusive investigative stories. Forbes reported that stories reported in The Information led to the site contributing to over $97 billion worth of brokered industry deals since its founding.

In April 2017, The Information announced the launch of Briefing, a new feature to the site consisting of a list of daily headlines with commentary on articles from other news sources. In December 2019, the company launched 'The Tech Top 10', a basic, consumer-focused offering. In 2021, the company launched The Electric, its first standalone subscription publication, which focuses on electric vehicle news. Lessin has indicated that The Information plans to expand its coverage into financial news, and that one third of the publication's reader base work in financial services.

== Reception ==
Vanity Fair included The Information on its 2014 New Establishment list. The New York Times reported in 2020 that "The Information’s reporters have become known in Silicon Valley for sniffing out the industry’s misdeeds and tweaking its powerful" and that the Financial Times had expressed interest "in a possible takeover," but also noted close ties to leaders in the tech industry, which publication covers.
