= Matthew Granade =

American founder, entrepreneur, and investor

Matthew W. Granade
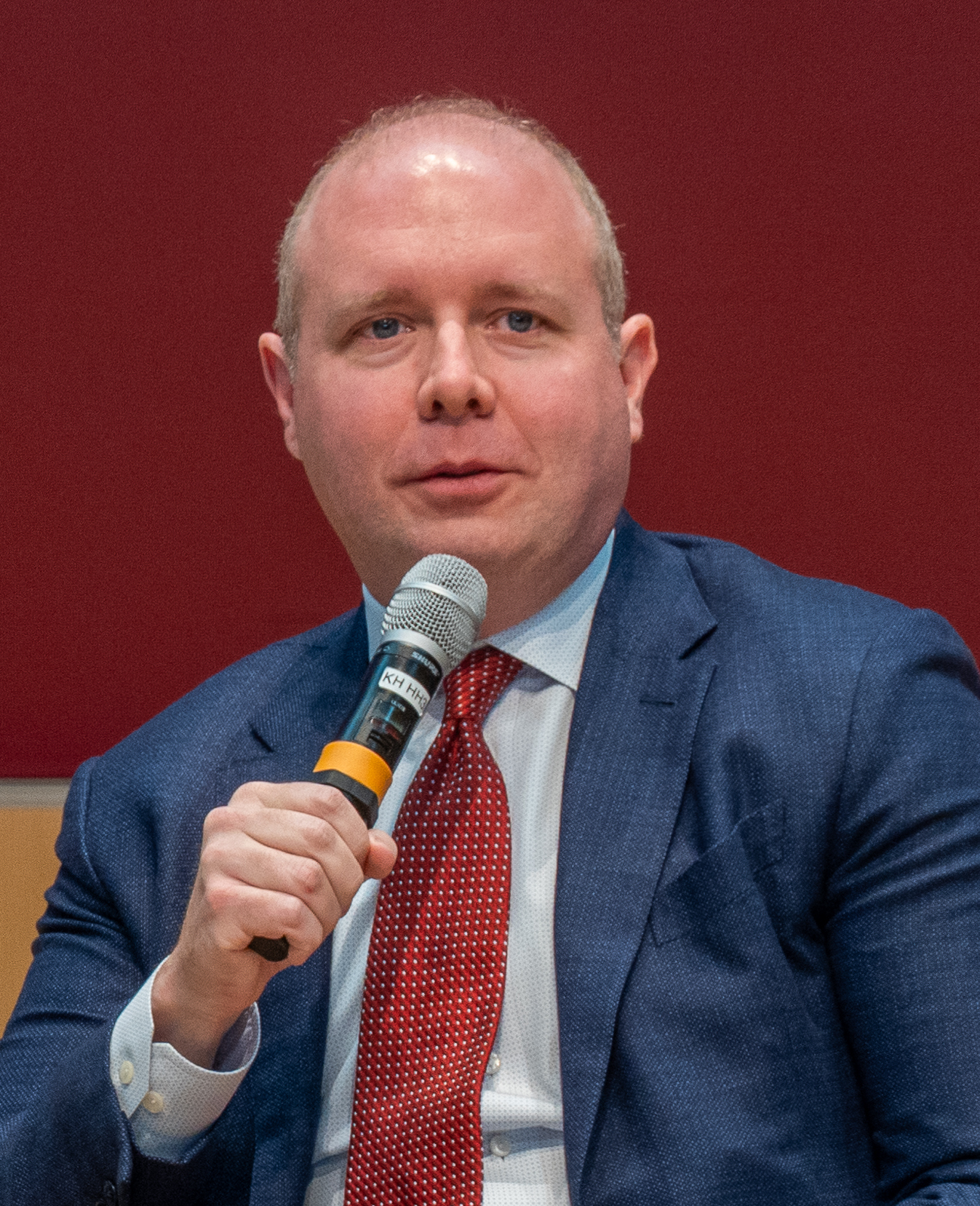
- Granade at Harvard Business School Investment Conference 2025
- Born: c. 1976 (age 49–50); Georgia, United States
- Education: Harvard University (AB); Harvard Business School (MBA)
- Occupations: Founder, entrepreneur, investor
- Partner: Hannah Choi Granade
- Parent(s): Carolyn H. Granade and Mercer Granade

Matthew Granade is an American founder, entrepreneur, and investor. A graduate of Harvard Business School, he worked at McKinsey & Company and Bridgewater Associates, after which he co-founded his own data science platform, Domino Data Labs.

In 2015, Granade joined Point72 Asset Management as a chief marketing intelligence officer specializing in data research and analysis; one year later, he joined Point72 Ventures, a venture capital firm with interests in artificial intelligence along with enterprise and financial technology. In 2020, Business Insider named Granade one of the "24 quants driving the future of hedge funds." That same year, Granade stepped down from his roles in Point72 Asset Management and Point72 Ventures.

== Early life and education ==
Granade grew up in Atlanta, Georgia. He attended Harvard University as an undergraduate and served as the president of The Harvard Crimson; he also worked as the deputy communications director for Roy Barnes, the then-Georgia governor, in 1999 and 2000. Afterward, he enrolled in Harvard Business School as a George F. Baker scholar and earned a Master of Business Administration.

== Career ==
After graduating from Harvard Business School in 2006, Granade worked at McKinsey & Company and Bridgewater Associates. At the latter firm, Granade was once assigned to be the "ski partner" of American lawyer James Comey who had joined as general counsel in 2010.

Later, in 2013, Granade, Chris Yang, and Nick Elpin co-founded Domino Data Lab, a platform that helps companies leverage data science and machine learning models in order to advance their goals and objectives. He currently serves on its board of directors; he has also served on the boards of directors for companies like Say, Tempo, and Quantopian.

=== Point72 Asset Management ===
In 2015, Granade was hired as a chief market intelligence officer by Point72 Asset Management, an American hedge fund founded and led by Steve Cohen. There, he was in charge of "data ranging from sell-side research to alternative data that is then incorporated into the firm's quant and fundamental investing strategies." As part of his role, Granade also developed "unique information assets" for the firm's clients and led the central portfolio of the firm.

In 2016, in Business Insider, Granade indicated the Point72 Asset Management's "long-standing commitment to quantitative-style investing here" and expressed the growing role and importance of big data and data analysis in investment and portfolio management, as well as an industry shift toward bringing on data scientists and training portfolio managers in data analysis. He also emphasized the need for alternative data, or new data, which could be made useful through machine learning and subsequently incorporated into financial models. In another interview with Business Insider, however, Granade pointed out that "data is simply one insight out of many" and that actionable analysis from alternate data would be the crucial determining factor of whether private equity could actually succeed with data.

In December of 2020, Granade left Point72 Asset Management, as well as Point72 Ventures, amid Cohen's restructuring of his hedge fund.

=== Point72 Ventures ===
Also in 2016, Granade also started managing the venture capital firm, Point72 Ventures, that funded startup companies specializing in enterprise technologies, fintech, cybersecurity, artificial intelligence, among other interests. He and Cohen also expressed interest in investing in autonomous vehicles, as well as helping expand fintech in Asia. By 2018, Point72 Ventures had already made "three dozen investments" totaling several million.

When asked about whether Point72 Ventures was investing in cryptocurrency in 2018, Granade stated: "No, we are not. Not in any sort of active way. We have done a lot of research. Steve is intellectually curious about it. We have not come up with a thesis yet, but that doesn't mean we won't develop a thesis."

In 2020, Granade stated that "The current health care system is broken, particularly in the United States" and said that its structural problems would be remedied by "technical founders who are dedicated to reimagining how the health care system should function at scale." That same year, Point72 Ventures announced plans to direct their investments toward the healthcare industry.

=== Model-driven business ===
In 2018, Granade and Cohen penned an op-ed for The Washington Post in which they forecasted the rise of artificial intelligence and machine learning models:

We believe a new, more powerful, business model has evolved from its software predecessor. These companies structure their business processes to put continuously learning models, built on 'closed loop' data, at the center of what they do. When built right, they create a reinforcing cycle: Their products get better, allowing them to collect more data, which allows them to build better models, making their products better, and onward. These are model-driven businesses.

Specifically, Granade and Cohen argued that the difference from a "data-driven business" and a "model-driven business" was that the former simply used data to inform business decisions, whereas the latter created models—or unique, specialized sets of data—that could continuously run in order to optimize products and therefore profit.

Granade and Cohen then pointed out five observations for the "model-driven business" of the future: 1) data must be complete, or closed-loop, such that "the company knows the inputs and the outputs, the prediction and the eventual outcome", 2) data must operate as "a flywheel, or virtuous circle" of "continuous improvement" on behalf of products, 3) existing companies will have an advantage insofar as they already have lots of data to build models with, whereas startup companies will have to strategize on how to acquire lots of data quickly, 4) there will be a need for "a new discipline of model management—the people, processes and technologies required to develop, validate, deliver and monitor models that create that critical competitive advantage", and 5) there will be new "ethical and compliance challenges" as data becomes more and more specific to consumers.

== Personal life ==
Granade is married to Hannah Choi Granade; they met at Harvard University.
