= Henry W. McGee =

American businessman and academic (born 1953)

- Born: January 22, 1953 (age 73); Chicago, Illinois, U.S.
- Education: Harvard University; Harvard Business School
- Occupations: Businessman, academic
- Employer: Harvard Business School
- Spouse: Celia McGee
- Children: 1 daughter
- Parent(s): Henry McGee Jr. Catherine Williams

Henry W. McGee (born January 22, 1953) is an American businessman and academic. He is a senior lecturer of business administration at the Harvard Business School, and the former president of HBO Home Entertainment.

== Early life ==
Henry W. McGee was born on January 22, 1953, in Chicago, Illinois. He graduated from Harvard University in 1974 and earned a master in business administration from the Harvard Business School in 1979.

Henry is of multiracial African / European heritage.

== Career ==
McGee began his career as a reporter for Newsweek in 1974. He joined HBO in 1979. He was the senior vice president of programming at HBO Video from 1988 to 1995, and he served as the president of HBO Home Entertainment from 1995 to 2013. He served on the board of directors of Quickflix from July 17, 2012, to November 16, 2012.

McGee has been a senior lecturer of business administration at the Harvard Business School since 2013. He serves on the boards of directors of AmerisourceBergen and Tegna, Inc.

Currently, McGee joined the faculty of Harvard Business School (HBS). During his tenure, McGee has co-authored many media industry cases and is a member of the school's Digital Initiative and Business History Initiative. McGee is also a director of the Pew Research Center in Washington, D.C. McGee is the former president of the Alvin Ailey Dance Theater Foundation and the Film Society of the Lincoln Center for the Performing Arts. McGee was also inducted into the Video Hall of Fame, the home entertainment industry's most prestigious honor.

== Personal life ==
McGee has a wife, Celia, and a daughter, Honor. They reside in New York City.

Honor Serena Wadsworth McGee, the daughter of Celia B. McGee and Henry W. McGee III of New York, was married Saturday evening to Jay Russell Lundy Jr., a son of Calesti B. Lundy and Mr. Lundy Sr. of Fort Pierce, Fla. Judge Patti B. Saris of the Federal District Court in Boston officiated at Winvian Farm in Morris, Conn. The couple met at Harvard University, from which they graduated; they also earned master's degrees there, she in public policy and he in public administration.
