= Ira Stoll =

American journalist

- Born: 1972 (age 53–54)

Ira Stoll (born 1972) is a senior writer at The Washington Free Beacon. He was previously editor of The Editors, a columnist for the Algemeiner, and wrote a column that appeared in The New York Sun, Reason, Newsmax, the New Boston Post and the Las Vegas Review-Journal. He was editor of FutureOfCapitalism.com from 2009 to 2024. He was managing editor of Education Next, an American education policy journal based at the Harvard Kennedy School from 2019 to 2023. He was vice president and managing editor of the daily newspaper, The New York Sun, which was published from 2002 to 2008. He founded Smartertimes.com. Previously, he was Washington correspondent and managing editor of The Forward and the North American editor of the Jerusalem Post. He is a graduate of Worcester Academy and Harvard University, where he graduated in 1994, and was president of The Harvard Crimson.

== Works ==
Stoll is the author of Samuel Adams: A Life, a 2008 biography of the life of the Founding Father Samuel Adams. The biography received praise, but was also criticized as incomplete in the Journal of American History. Other reviews noted that the biography was written from a politically conservative point of view.

Stoll also published a 2013 biography of former United States President John F. Kennedy, titled JFK, Conservative, in which Stoll argues that President Kennedy is properly characterized as a political conservative.

== Bibliography ==
- Samuel Adams: A Life (2008)
- JFK, Conservative (2013)
