= Jay Varma =

American physician and epidemiologist

Jay K. Varma
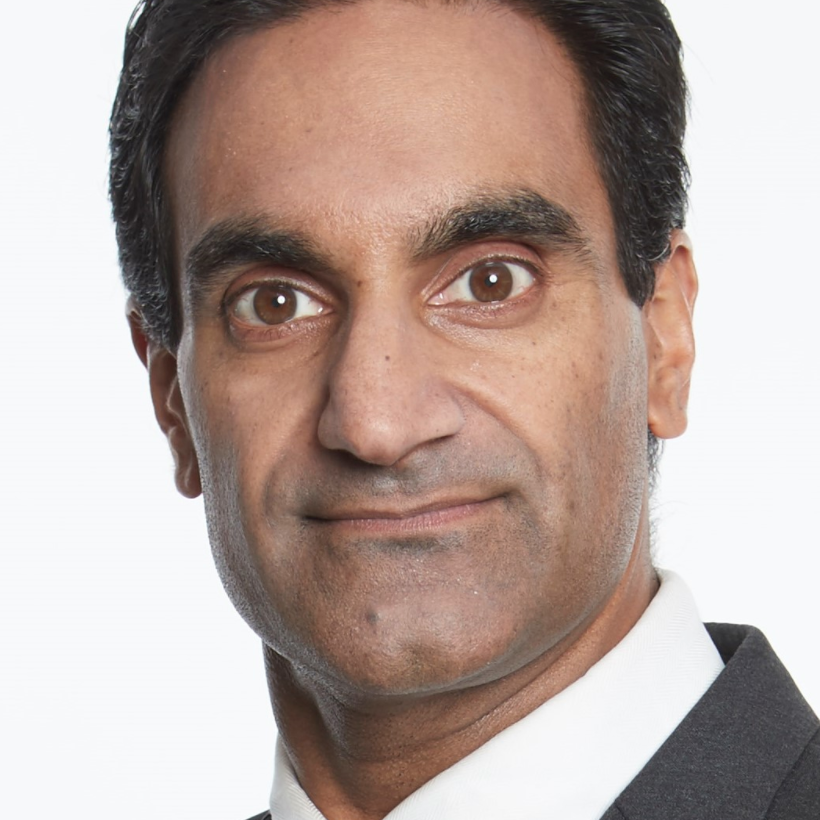
- Education: UC San Diego School of Medicine; Harvard University
- Medical career
- Profession: Physician; Epidemiologist
- Field: Epidemiology
- Institutions: Centers for Disease Control, New York City Department of Health and Mental Hygiene, New York City Office of the Mayor
- Sub-specialties: Epidemiology
- Research: Epidemiology

Jay Varma is an American physician and epidemiologist who previously served as senior advisor for public health and COVID-19 to New York City Mayor Bill de Blasio.

In that role, Varma helped lead New York City's COVID-19 pandemic response, including diagnostic testing, contact tracing, vaccine mandates and the phased re-opening of businesses. He was the architect of the NYC plans for public schools during the COVID-19 crisis.

== Early life and education ==
Varma graduated magna cum laude from Harvard University. Varma completed medical school, internal medicine residency, and chief residency at the University of California San Diego School of Medicine.

== Career ==
In 2001, Varma joined the Centers for Disease Control's Epidemic Intelligence Service, working on foodborne diseases. That same year, he led the CDC's study of an E. coli outbreak at an Ohio county fair, determining the bacteria was spread through sawdust in the air of an Exhibition Hall, the first time scientists connected transmission of E. Coli to a contaminated building.

While working for the CDC on infectious disease prevention and control, Varma had postings in Atlanta, Thailand, China, Ethiopia, and New York City. From 2003 to 2008, Varma directed the CDC's tuberculosis programs and research in Southeast Asia. From 2008 to 2011, he directed the CDC's International Emerging Infections Program in Beijing, China.

He became the deputy commissioner of the New York City Department of Health and Mental Hygiene in 2011. In 2014, he acted as the "incident commander" for Ebola in New York after two people tested positive for the virus. Varma authorized the 21 day quarantine of the fiancée and two of friends of a doctor who fell ill with Ebola after he returned from treating patients in Guinea. That same year he led NYC's response to an outbreak of measles in more than two dozen people and an outbreak of meningitis among gay and bisexual men. He also managed the city's response to an outbreak of Legionnaires' Disease cases in 2014-2015 linked to contaminated cooling towers, which sickened dozens of people and killed four.

Varma also worked as the Senior Advisor to the Director of Africa CDC, assisting with strategy and execution of the Africa Centres for Disease Control's programs and helping develop the African Union's continent-wide strategy for COVID-19.

During the COVID-19 pandemic, Varma became de Blasio's senior advisor for public health, after the mayor clashed with NYC Health Commissioner Oxiris Barbot. Before Barbot left the department, Varma was described as a "shadow commissioner" for COVID-19 matters.

In September 2020, Varma was involved in NYC's opening of a laboratory that prioritized testing for city residents. In December 2020, Varma said New York City was monitoring wastewater and sewers to find COVID-19 clusters before they appear through patient testing.

After a new variant of COVID-19 called B.1.526 was identified in February 2021 as likely originating in NYC, Varma said preliminary analysis of the variant showed it was likely more infectious, but New Yorkers did not need to take additional precautions.

Varma was the architect of the NYC plans for the public school system during the COVID-19 crisis, including assessing the risk factors for keeping schools partially opened in January 2021 as citywide positivity rates climbed. In March 2021, the journal Pediatrics published a peer-reviewed study authored by Varma about COVID-19 transmission rates in NYC schools between October and December 2020. The study showed virus transmission rates remained low within in-person classes, with 191 of 36,000 students and staff quarantined after exposure to COVID-19 testing positive for a transmission rate of .5%. A follow-up study during the COVID-19 Delta wave showed that vaccination and other COVID-19 prevention measures continued to keep transmission low; fewer than 1 in 100 people exposed to COVID in school went on to develop active disease.

After becoming a professor at Weill Cornell Medical College and director of the Cornell Center for Pandemic Prevention and Response in September 2021, Varma spoke out critically regarding the decision by the administration of New York Mayor Eric Adams to remove COVID-19 vaccine verification for public facilities, exempting basketball player Kyrie Irving from being vaccinated, and removing COVID-19 vaccine mandates for government and private employers.

Varma has written articles on a range of public health issues for outlets including the Washington Post, New York Times, and Atlantic.

Varma joined the Board of Directors for SIGA Technologies in November 2022 and began serving as Executive Vice President and Chief Medical Officer in September 2023. Varma was fired in September 2024.

== Recognition and awards ==
In 2010, Varma was recognized as the U.S. Public Health Service Physician Researcher of the Year. In 2011, he received the Public Health Service Distinguished Service Medal, the highest decoration of the Department of Health and Human Services United States Public Health Service Commissioned Corps. In 2017, he was awarded Physician Leader of the Year. In 2018 he received the Public Health Service Meritorious Service Medal.

Varma serves on the advisory committee to the US CDC director. He is a member of the Council on Foreign Relations.

== Selected works ==
Varma has authored 144 scientific manuscripts, 12 essays, and one book.

Some of his peer-reviewed works include:

- Varma, JK; Greene, KD; Reller, M; DeLong, SM; Trottier, J; Nowicki, SJ; Diorio, M; Koch, EM; Bannerman, T; York, ST; Lambert-Fair, M; Wells, JG; Mead, PS (2003). "An outbreak of E. coli O157:Non-motile infections following exposure to a contaminated building". The Journal of the American Medical Association. 290 (20): 2709–2712. doi:10.1001/jama.290.20.2709. PMID 14645313.
- Varma, JK; Samuel, MC; Marcus, R; Hoekstra, RM; Medus, C; Segler, S; Anderson, BJ; Jones, TF; Shiferaw, B; Haubert, N; Megginson, M; McCarthy, PV; Graves, L; Van Gilder, T; Angulo, FJ (February 15, 2007). "Listeria monocytogenes infection from foods prepared in a commercial establishment: A case-control study of potential sources for sporadic illness in the United States". Clinical Infectious Diseases. 44 (4): 521–528. doi:10.1086/509920. PMID 17243054. S2CID 19698093.
- Cain, KP; McCarthy, KD; Heilig, CM; Monkongdee, P; Tasaneeya, Pan T; Kanara, N; Kimerling, M; Chheng, CP; Thai, S; Borann, S; Phanuphak, P; Teeratakulpisarn, N; Phanuphak, N; Dung, NH; Quy, HT; Thai, LH; Varma, JK (February 25, 2010). "An algorithm for tuberculosis screening and diagnosis in people with HIV". N Engl J Med. 362 (8): 707–716. doi:10.1056/NEJMoa0907488. PMID 20181972.
- Feng, Z; Li, W; Varma, JK (January 2011). "Gaps remain in China's ability to detect emerging infectious diseases, despite advances since the onset of SARS and avian flu". Health Affairs. 30 (1): 127–135. doi:10.1377/hlthaff.2010.0606. PMID 21209448.
- Varma, JK; Thamkittikasem, J; Whittemore, K; Alexander, M; Stephens, DH; Arslanian, K; Bray, J; Long, TG (March 8, 2021). "COVID-19 infections among students and staff in New York City public schools". Pediatrics. 147 (5). doi:10.1542/peds.2021-050605. PMID 33688033. S2CID 232169688.
- Varma, JK; Taylor, Jill; Sharfstein, Joshua M. (March 1, 2023). "Planning For The Next Pandemic: Lab Systems Need Policy Shift To Speed Emerging Infectious Disease Warning And Tracking. Health Affairs. 42 (3): 366–373. doi:10.1377/hlthaff.2022.01211. ISSN 0278-2715.
