= James Ulmer (journalist) =

American entertainment journalist

- Born: United States
- Alma mater: Harvard College
- Occupation: Journalist
- Writing career
- Language: English
- Subjects: Journalism, entertainment

James Ulmer is an American entertainment journalist who created a ranking list of actors, known as the "Ulmer scale". Ulmer is also the author of the books James Ulmer's Hollywood Hot List – The Complete Guide to Star Ranking and the Directors Hot List, which measure the global value of stars and directors in a variety of areas. These include bankability, career management, professionalism, promotion, risk factors, and talent.

== Personal life ==
Ulmer obtained his degree from Harvard College and during his time there, he was the editor of The Harvard Crimson. He is an Iowa native. When Ulmer is not working, he enjoys playing ragtime piano and shooting and editing videos.

== Career ==
Ulmer has been working in journalism for over 20 years. He is a contributing editor for The New York Times and two national columns for Premiere Magazine. He has also written for Variety, The Los Angeles Times and The Observer in London. He has also spent eight years as international editor and columnist for The Hollywood Reporter where he was responsible for supervising a team of 35 correspondents and reporting across the world at film festivals and markets.

Ulmer has been interviewed by a number of publications and media outlets which include: The Wall Street Journal, The New York Times Magazine, The Los Angeles Times and Newsweek and he has also appeared frequently on Entertainment Tonight, CBS This Morning, CNN Showbiz Today, Voice of America, HBO, BBC, FOX, and E!.

== Honors and awards ==
Ulmer was nominated for a Press Award by the Publicists Guild of America.

== Organizations ==
He served on the competition jury for the Cairo International Film Festival.
