= The Citizen (Auburn, New York) =

Daily newspaper published in Auburn, NY

- Type: Daily newspaper
- Format: Broadsheet
- Owner: Lee Enterprises
- Editor-in-chief: David Wilcox
- Managing editor: Michael Dowd
- Founded: 1816
- Language: English
- Headquarters: 25 Dill Street; Auburn, New York 13021
- Circulation: 10,498 Daily (as of 2023)
- ISSN: 0738-7520
- OCLC number: 9672166
- Website: auburnpub.com

The Citizen, commonly referred to as The Auburn Citizen, is the only daily newspaper published in Auburn, New York. The paper serves Cayuga County and parts of the greater Central New York area. The publication is owned by Lee Enterprises.

== History ==
The paper traces its roots to 1816. The paper has been named The Citizen for decades but was previously published as The Citizen-Advertiser and The Daily Advertiser, among other names.

Except on Sundays, when it was a morning paper, and Saturdays, on which the paper did not publish an edition for most of its history, The Citizen was an afternoon paper until 2008.

In 1999, The Citizen added a Saturday edition, and in 2008, it switched from an afternoon publication to a morning publication, publishing papers seven days a week.

On March 10, 2013, The Citizen announced it was returning to a six-day publication schedule as of April 1, 2013, with the paper no longer publishing a Monday edition.

Starting July 11, 2023, the print edition of the newspaper will be reduced to three days a week: Tuesday, Thursday and Saturday. Also, the newspaper will transition from being delivered by a traditional newspaper delivery carrier to mail delivery by the U.S. Postal Service.

== Notable alumni ==
- William O. Dapping covered the 1929–30 riots at Auburn Prison for the newspaper; this coverage earned a Pulitzer Prize for the paper.
- Leo Pinckney, former president of Auburn Community Baseball and former president of the New York–Penn League, was a sports editor and sports columnist for The Citizen for over 40 years.
- Kevin Rivoli, a photojournalist whose work has appeared in Sports Illustrated, USA Today, and The New York Times, began his career as a photographer for The Citizen.
