= List of Collegiate School (New York City) alumni =

This list of alumni of New York City's Collegiate School includes graduates and students who did not graduate.

- George Axelrod, 1940, playwright
- Jason Beghe, 1978, actor
- David Benioff, 1988, author and screenwriter
- Egbert Benson, 1760, a Founding Father of the United States, member of the U.S. House of Representatives, 1st attorney general of New York, and founder of the New-York Historical Society
- Peter Bogdanovich, 1957, filmmaker and author
- George Platt Brett, 1911, chairman of MacMillan Publishing
- Benjamin Bronfman, 2000, entrepreneur and musician
- Edgar Bronfman Jr., 1973, CEO of Warner Music Group
- Dan Cogan, 1987, producer and director
- Parker Conrad, 1998, CEO of Rippling
- Jeff Cowen, 1984, photographer
- Joseph Cullman, 1930, businessman and CEO of Philip Morris cigarette company 1957–1978
- Matthew Daddario, 2006, actor
- Christopher d'Amboise, 1978, dancer, choreographer, writer, and theater director
- Samuel Dickson, c.1820, member of the U.S. House of Representatives from New York
- David Duchovny, 1978, Golden Globe-winning actor and director
- Nabil Fahmy, 1968, Egyptian diplomat and politician and Minister of Foreign Affairs (2013–2014)
- Douglas Fairbanks Jr., 1926, actor and World War II naval officer
- William Finley, 1958, actor
- Edward Glaeser, 1984, economics professor
- Matt Haimovitz, 1989, cellist
- John Hermann, 1980, musician in Widespread Panic
- Paul Hodes, 1968, U.S. representative from New Hampshire
- Robert Hollander, 1951, academic
- Zachary Karabell, 1985, businessman and writer, contributing editor for Politico
- Bill Keenan, 2004, professional ice hockey player
- Douglas Kennedy, 1972, novelist
- John F. Kennedy Jr., class of 1978 (left after 10th grade), son of President John F. Kennedy
- John Kosner, 1978, writer, head of espn.com
- Bill Kristol, 1970, chief of staff to the vice president of the United States (1989–1993) for Dan Quayle, and founder and editor of The Weekly Standard
- Christopher Krovatin, 2003, author and musician
- Lil Mabu, 2023, rapper
- John Langeloth Loeb Jr., 1940, businessman and U.S. ambassador to Denmark
- Nicholas M. Loeb, 1993, businessman and actor
- Ben Lyons, 2000, film critic and TV personality
- Taylor Mali, 1983, poet and humorist
- Ian McGinnis, 1997, NCAA Division I men's basketball leading rebounder
- Walter Murch, 1961 Oscar-winning editor, sound designer, and filmmaker, referred to as "the most respected film editor and sound designer in the modern cinema"
- James M. Nack, 1825, poet
- John Bertram Oakes, 1929, journalist known for his early commitment to the environment, civil rights, and opposition to the Vietnam War; creator of the modern op-ed page
- Alexander Olch, 2003, designer
- Jeffrey Orridge, 1978, commissioner of the Canadian Football League
- Dan-el Padilla Peralta, 2002, classicist
- Bill Perkins, 1968, New York state senator (2007–2017) and member of the New York City Council
- Alex Prud'homme, journalist
- Ben Rhodes, 1996, deputy National Security advisor for Strategic Communication and speechwriter for President Barack Obama
- David Rhodes, 1994, president of CBS News
- Jack Richardson, 1951, essayist and playwright known for existentialist drama
- John A. Roebling II (1867–1952), engineer and philanthropist
- Cesar Romero, 1926, actor
- Mark Ronson, 1993, Grammy-winning producer and DJ
- Christopher Ross, 1949, sculptor, designer and collector
- Andrew Rossi, 1991, documentary filmmaker
- Alex Rubens, 1996, writer for Key and Peele and Rick and Morty
- John Rubinstein, 1964, actor
- Cormac Ryan, 2018 (transferred), basketball player
- Jack Schlossberg, 2011, writer, only male surviving descendant of John F. Kennedy
- Serge Schmemann, 1963, writer and editor
- Wallace Shawn, 1961, playwright, actor. Left Collegiate after 9th grade.
- Michael Shnayerson, 1972, contributing editor, Vanity Fair
- Anthony Shorris, 1974, first deputy mayor of New York City
- Sam Sifton, 1984, food critic
- Robert F. X. Sillerman, 1966, media entrepreneur
- Arthur Ochs Sulzberger Jr., 1969, former publisher, The New York Times
- Vivek Tiwary, 1991, writer and theater producer
- Luis Ubiñas, 1981, former president of the Ford Foundation
- Stephanus Van Cortlandt, c. 1655, member of the Board of Deacons (1672), mayor of New York City
- Cornelius Vanderbilt II, 1859, son of William Henry Vanderbilt and grandson of Cornelius Vanderbilt
- Andrew Wagner, 1981, filmmaker
- James Warren, 1971, journalist
- Kenneth Webb, 1902, film director, screenwriter, and composer
- John Weidman, 1964, playwright
- Paul Weitz, 1983, filmmaker and playwright
- Billy Wirth, 1980, actor and director
- David Wise, 1972, screenwriter
- Alex York, Japanese media personality, author, and musician
- J. Peder Zane, 1980, journalist and author
