= Secondment =

Temporary assignment of a member to another organization

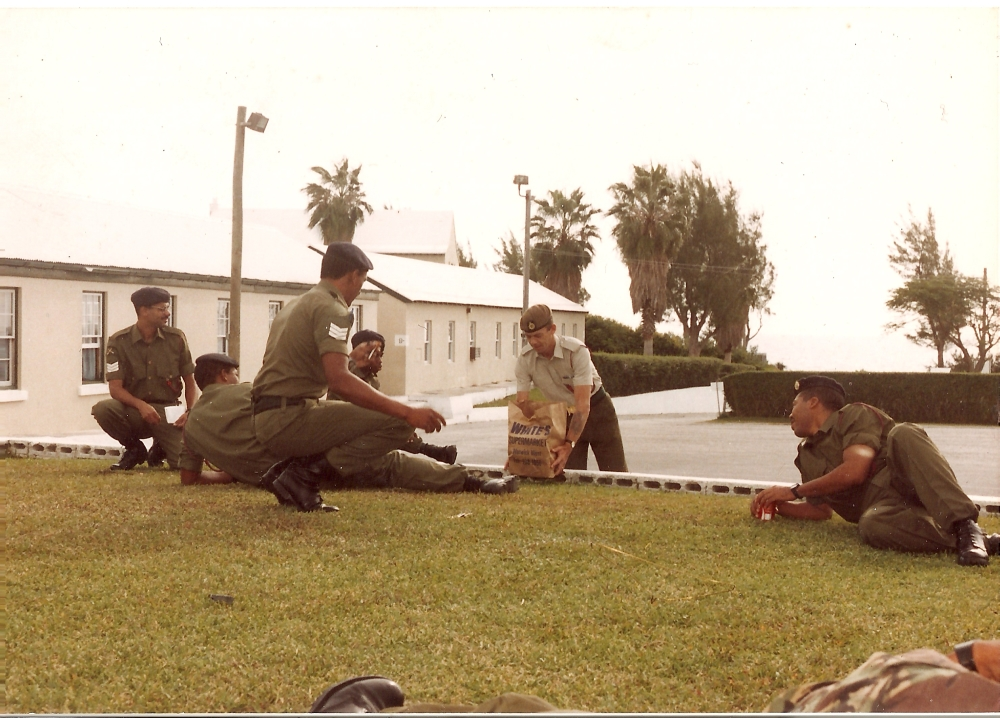
The warrant officer in the khaki shirt is an instructor who has been seconded from the Royal Anglian Regiment to the Bermuda Regiment to provide training

Secondment is the temporary assignment of a member of one organization to another organization, or, in the case of an internal secondment, within an organisation.

== Terminology ==
The term "secondment" is widely used in Great Britain and Commonwealth countries. In some areas (e.g. India), a temporary transfer of employees is called "on deputation".

In the Soviet Union, such reassignment was called Commadirovki and denoted a career-related trip outside of work. For example, the 1967 comedy Kidnapping, Caucasian Style takes place while its protagonist Shurik is on secondment to the Caucasus in order to record indigenous folklore.

== Job rotation ==
The employee typically retains their salary and other employment rights from their primary organization but they work closely within the other organization to provide training, a liaison between the two companies and the sharing of experience. Secondment is a more formal type of job rotation. This is not to be confused with temporary work.

Secondment, sometimes referred to as employer of record (EoR) or professional employer organization (PEO), can also be used to help organizations hire during a headcount freeze. In the current day, some businesses use it as a solution to enter into new markets, bypassing the cost of opening their own business entity.

== Use ==
For example, statisticians from the British Government Statistical Service may be assigned to the Full Fact charity, to check statistics presented in political campaigns and the mass media. In the military, an exchange officer is a commissioned officer in a country's armed forces who is temporarily seconded either to a unit of the armed forces of another country or to another branch of the armed forces of their own country. A Guardian report in 2017 observed that "half of the employees seconded to the Department for International Development" (as it was then) were seconded from organisations in the defence industry.

Internal secondments also enable staff with one speciality to obtain a broader view of their organisation's operations, markets and strategies.

== See also ==
- Student exchange program
- Temporary duty assignment
