= Deel, Inc. =

Private Delaware-based payroll and compliance provider

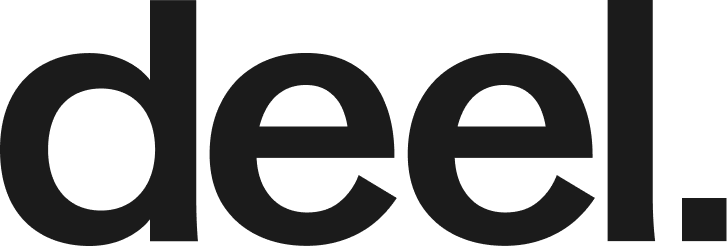
- Type: Private
- Founded: 2019; 7 years ago
- Founder: Alex Bouaziz (CEO); Shuo Wang (CRO); Dan Westgarth (COO)
- Products: Professional employer organization services and payroll services
- Revenue: ▲US$1 billion (2025)
- Number of employees: 7,500 (2025)
- Website: deel.com

Deel, Inc. is an American payroll and human resources company, incorporated in Delaware that operates remotely with a globally distributed workforce. The company provides hiring, payments, and workforce management services for companies hiring international employees and contractors, incorporating artificial intelligence into its software to automate regulatory compliance and administrative tasks. The company was founded in 2019 by Alex Bouaziz, Shuo Wang, and Ofer Simon.

== History ==
Deel was founded in 2019 by Alex Bouaziz (Deel CEO), Shuo Wang (Deel CRO), and Ofer Simon. Bouaziz and Wang met while studying at MIT in 2013. The founders launched Deel after encountering difficulty hiring international workers for their previous ventures.

Bouaziz was educated at Jewish schools in Paris, where Hebrew was the second language of instruction, and moved to Israel alone at age 17 before studying engineering at the Technion.

The company develops a platform for hiring, paying, and managing remote workers. Deel hires employees through their own local entity on a company's behalf, acting as the employer of record and managing compliance with employment laws in each country. This service includes managing benefits including health insurance, equity, tax advice and employee perks. Deel currently owns around 250 entities globally and manages in-house, in-country payroll teams in over 130 countries, in addition to offering employer of record, contractor, immigration, HRIS, and performance management services. The company processes international payrolls, allowing withdrawals in different currencies.

Deel provides templates for creating contracts that comply with local labor laws. It also helps workers access health insurance, and provides immigration advice about visa processes to companies.

Deel launched after entering the Y Combinator startup accelerator in 2019. The company then raised several rounds of funding. In May 2020, venture capital firm Andreessen Horowitz led a $14 million Series A round. In September 2020, Spark Capital led a $48 million Series B. In April 2021, Deel raised $156 million in a Series C round, with participation from Horowitz's a16z and other investors, becoming a unicorn. In October 2021, Coatue and DST Global led a $425 million in a Series D. Deel also raised $50 million in May 2022, with contributions from impact investor Emerson Collective, valuing the company at $12 billion. In October 2025, Deel raised $300 million, at a valuation of $17.3 billion.

As Deel expanded, Forbes reported that the company sent "a five-person 'Navy SEAL' team" to visit multiple countries in order to quickly incorporate local business entities. It also began to make acquisitions to increase its owned infrastructure as well as human rights and payroll services.

Deel's business grew from $4 million Annual Recurring Revenue (ARR) in 2020, to $54 million ARR in 2021, $100M ARR in 2022; $500M in ARR. In February 2025, Deel reported it hit an annual revenue run rate of $800 million, adding VC firm General Catalyst, as part of a $300 million secondary share sale.

In March 2023, former workers claimed they were mis-categorized. In June 2023, California state senator Steve Padilla sent a formal request to the California Labor and Workforce Development Agency asking them to investigate the allegations. Deel denied the allegations and engaged with lawmakers to address their concerns.

In 2024, Deel created a "Future of Work" advisory board that includes Elaine Chao, former U.S. Secretary of Transportation and Labor; Heidi Heitkamp, former senator from North Dakota; Seth Harris, former acting U.S. Secretary of Labor; and Charlotte Corley, former banking and consumer finance commissioner for Mississippi.

In February 2025, it reported having 5,000 employees.

By the end of 2025, Deel had acquired 13 companies including payroll and bookkeeping software company Zeitgold; Human resources software company Roots; Australian-based payroll company Paygroup; immigration startup Legalpad; Capbase, a 'people development' startup based in Munich, Germany; Zavvy, Payspace, an African-based payroll engine; IT device management service Hofy; London-based money transfer service Atlantic Money; compensation management startup Assemble; and Safeguard Global's payroll division.

A federal RICO lawsuit filed in January 2025 against Deel accuses the company of flouting anti-money laundering regulations and facilitating the evasion of U.S. sanctions against Russia. The lawsuit stems from a court-appointed receiver seeking to recover damages from an SEC case against Brent Seaman of Surge Capital Ventures. While the complaint alleges Deel violated certain Florida licensing requirements, it acknowledges the company has since obtained proper licensing in the state. Deel denies any wrongdoing, and in January 2025 filed a motion to dismiss, calling the lawsuit baseless, and "a coordinated effort by a major investor in Deel’s primary competitor". Deel continues to expand its compliance efforts through its DPayments subsidiary, which has obtained 26 state licenses for money transmission as of early 2025. Deel has not been accused of any wrongdoing by the SEC. On August 19, 2025, the United States District Court for the Southern District of Florida granted Deel's motion to dismiss the lawsuit, and ruled that the case was closed.

In February 2025, CEO Alex Bouaziz stated that Deel was preparing for a potential IPO, saying the company was "getting ready to go out, potentially next year or a bit later."

In March 2025, Rippling filed a complaint against Deel, accusing the company of corporate espionage. Deel has denied any wrongdoing. In June 2025, Deel filed an amended complaint alleging that Rippling stole its Employer of Record product, citing evidence of repeated infiltration by a Rippling employee using a fake company to access proprietary documents and data. On August 29, 2025, Keith O'Brien, the former Rippling executive associated with these allegations and who later became a paid witness for Rippling, dropped his lawsuit alleging surveillance.

On June 3, 2025, Deel surpassed a $1 billion annual run rate in Q1, with 75% year-over-year revenue growth from April 2024 to April 2025. In 2024, Deel was named to CNBC's Disruptor 50, and in September 2025, Deel was named in the top 10 of the Forbes Cloud 100 2025 List.

In October 2025, Deel raised a US $300 million Series E funding round co-led by Ribbit Capital and Andreessen Horowitz, bringing its valuation to approximately US $17.3 billion.

In November 2025, Deel appointed former Intuit executive Joe Kauffman as President and Chief Financial Officer, signalling the company’s intent to prepare for an initial public offering. Also during 2025, Deel appointed a chief risk officer, chief compliance officer, and general counsel.

In January 2026, it was reported that the United States Department of Justice had launched a criminal investigation into Deel over allegations that the company hired a corporate spy to leak confidential information about rival Rippling. Deel countered with a lawsuit against Rippling, alleging espionage.

Deel acquired Israeli AI cybersecurity firm Clarity in August 2026.

== Sponsorship ==
In December 2025, Arsenal F.C. announced Deel as the club's new human resources partner. In May 2026, Deel was announced as Arsenal's new sleeve sponsor.

== See also ==
- Global labor arbitrage
- Global workforce
- PAPAYA Global
