= Aspire (platform) =

- Type: Private
- Industry: Financial technology, financial services
- Founded: January 2018
- Headquarters: Singapore
- Area served: More than 30 markets
- Products: Business accounts, corporate cards, payments, foreign-exchange services, expense management, yield products, employment services
- Website: aspireapp.com

Aspire is a Singapore-based financial technology platform providing financial services and software for businesses, including multi-currency accounts, corporate cards, payments, foreign-exchange services and expense management. Its operations have expanded from Southeast Asia to more than 30 markets, with regulatory approvals and registrations in jurisdictions including Hong Kong, Australia, Europe, the United States and Canada. By 2026, Aspire served more than 50,000 businesses across more than 30 markets.

== History ==
Aspire was established in Singapore in January 2018 by Andrea Baronchelli and Giovanni Casinelli, initially operating as Aspire Capital. Baronchelli had previously worked at Lazada, where he identified difficulties faced by smaller online merchants in obtaining working-capital financing. Aspire participated in Y Combinator's Winter 2018 accelerator batch and initially provided working-capital credit to small and medium-sized enterprises.

In July 2019, Aspire raised US$32.5 million in equity and debt in a Series A financing round led by MassMutual Ventures Southeast Asia, bringing its total funding at the time to approximately US$41.5 million.

Aspire subsequently expanded beyond lending into business accounts and financial-management software. Its business accounts were launched in May 2020, and by May 2021 had reached US$1 billion in annualised transaction volume.

In September 2021, Aspire raised US$158 million in a Series B financing comprising equity and debt. By this period, its services included business accounts, corporate cards, payments, invoice processing and financial-management tools.

In February 2023, Aspire raised US$100 million in an oversubscribed Series C equity round led by Lightspeed Venture Partners and Sequoia Capital India, with participation from PayPal Ventures and Tencent. At the time, it reported annualised payment volume of approximately US$12 billion and more than 15,000 business customers.

Financial filings reported by Tech in Asia showed that Aspire's revenue more than doubled to approximately US$18.2 million in the 2022 financial year, while its losses increased amid spending on regional expansion. In June 2023, Aspire said it had reached monthly net profitability.

In November 2023, Aspire opened a new headquarters in Singapore. In May 2024, it expanded into Hong Kong after obtaining a Money Service Operator licence from the Hong Kong Customs and Excise Department.

During 2025, Aspire expanded its regulatory presence outside Southeast Asia. By December, it had obtained an Australian Financial Services Licence, an Electronic Money Institution licence in the Netherlands for European operations, and registrations in the United States ahead of its planned launch there.

Aspire publicly launched its United States operations in April 2026. Fortune reported that its initial strategy focused on serving existing customers expanding into the United States before targeting US-based businesses. By 2026, Aspire served more than 50,000 businesses across more than 30 markets.

== Products and services ==
Aspire provides financial products and software for business customers. Its services include multi-currency accounts, corporate cards, domestic and cross-border payments, expense management, accounts payable and receivable tools, and foreign-exchange services.

On 19 August 2025, Aspire introduced Aspire Yield, an investment product for business cash balances. The product followed the granting of a Capital Markets Services licence to an Aspire subsidiary by the Monetary Authority of Singapore.

In May 2026, Aspire launched a programme for early-stage startups in Singapore, Hong Kong and the United States.

== Partnerships ==
In April 2020, Aspire launched a digital corporate card in partnership with Visa.

In May 2025, Aspire integrated with Stripe to allow business customers to accept card and digital-wallet payments through invoices and payment links.

In December 2025, Aspire expanded its international payment services in Hong Kong through Wise Platform.

In January 2026, Aspire partnered with Deel to add employer-of-record and payroll services to its platform.

In April 2026, Aspire partnered with J.P. Morgan Payments to support foreign-exchange conversions for its business customers.

== Regulation ==
Aspire operates through regulated entities in several jurisdictions. In Singapore, Aspire FT received in-principle approval from the Monetary Authority of Singapore for a Major Payment Institution licence in October 2024. A separate Aspire entity received a Capital Markets Services licence in 2025.

By December 2025, Aspire had obtained an Australian Financial Services Licence and an Electronic Money Institution licence through its Netherlands-based European entity. In the United States, it was registered as a money services business and as a registered investment adviser. In Canada, AFT CA LTD was registered with the Financial Transactions and Reports Analysis Centre of Canada as a money services business and with the Bank of Canada as a payment service provider under the Retail Payment Activities Act. Its Netherlands entity is listed in the Dutch financial-services register.

In April 2026, an Aspire subsidiary in Hong Kong received Type 1, Type 4 and Type 9 licences from the Securities and Futures Commission.

== Recognition ==
Aspire has appeared in business and financial-technology rankings. It was included in the Financial Times High-Growth Companies Asia-Pacific ranking in 2023 and 2025.

Aspire was also included in The Straits Times rankings of Singapore's fastest-growing companies in 2023, 2024 and 2025. CNBC included Aspire in its World's Top Fintech Companies ranking in 2024.
