= Hellen van Meene =

Dutch photographer (born 1972)

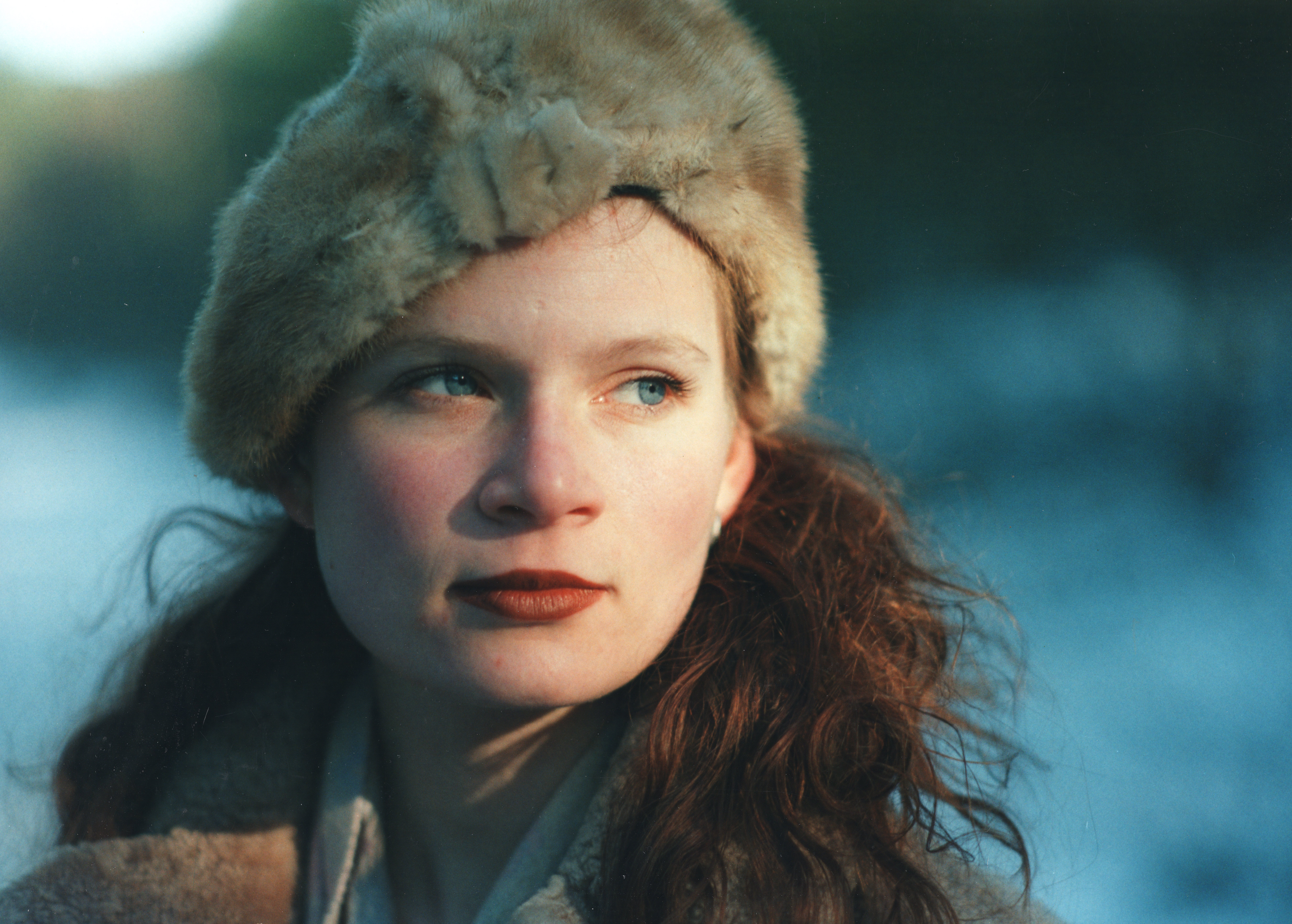
- Hellen van Meene
- Born: September 28, 1972 (age 53); Alkmaar
- Education: Gerrit Rietveld Academie
- Known for: Photography
- Website: Hellen van Meene Official Website

Hellen van Meene (born 28 September 1972) is a Dutch photographer known especially for her portraits.

For her portraits, she most often approaches girls on the street. She chooses her subject matter by finding girls who "could be said to have 'imperfect' faces and 'flawed' bodies". She pre-visualizes the portrait but is open to improvisation. The portraits bring out the "inherent grace in their changing faces and bodies." She usually finds the girls in her hometown. She is also trying to capture some of the details of older homes in the area using them as backgrounds.

Over the years, Van Meene has also turned to still lives, portraits of animals, and fashion photography.

She has been featured on CNN, TIME and more. She is a sought after workshop leader and has been commissioned to do projects by the Pump House to do a series on teenage mothers and the New York Times commissioned her to travel to Japan to photograph Japanese girls.

== Early life and education ==
Hellen van Meene was born in Alkmaar, the Netherlands. Her mother gave her a camera at age 15. Van Meene began taking photographs at age 16 when she would photograph her friends, which ultimately segued into the artist continuing to focus on adolescent girls in her professional photography with the aim of examining the construction of femininity in adolescence. For her undergraduate degree, Van Meene studied Fine Art at Rietveld Academy in Amsterdam. Other notable photographers who also graduated from Rietveld Academy in Amsterdam include Ger van Elk, Rineke Dijkstra, Peter Klashorst, Dana Lixenberg and Antonín Kratochvil. During her studies, van Meene spent a brief period in 1995 at the Edinburg College of Art. Other notable alumnae of this institution include Paul Rooney, Katie Paterson, and Paul Carter.

== Photography ==
=== Early work ===
Five years out of art school, van Meene was shortlisted for the Citibank Photography Prize (2001) and signed with New York's Matthew Marks gallery. Much of van Meene's early work is focused on photographing young girls in old houses in her hometown of Alkmaar.

As van Meene gained recognition for her work, she expanded her subject matter further. She spent some time working outside of her home country, in England, Russia, Latvia, the United States and Japan. In 2004, van Meene photographed a series of mothers and expecting women from Russia, the United Kingdom and Latvia. In the 2007 series, Going my Own Way Home, van Meene photographed residents of an impoverished neighbourhood in the post-Hurricane Katrina New Orleans, focusing more on the cultural and economic context of her subjects than in her previous works.

=== Major themes ===
Van Meene's portraits are more often of pubescent girls, clothed in softly coloured tops and dresses. Her subjects' clothing and gestures as well as the location and lighting are all planned by the artist, despite it seeming unclear how much of the scene is a candid moment of the subject's life captured by the photographer. Van Meene is quoted as saying that she finds beauty in the "unpolished, still evolving" adolescent girls and "the tension between her subjects' their childlike awkwardness and their near-adult bodies." Some publications have noted the "innocently erotic" element that is present in these photographs. The sexuality present in these photographs provokes discomfort in the viewer and raises the question of whether the models are aware of their sexuality and the effect it has on the viewer or whether they are unaware of the connotations of the way they have been positioned by the artist.

=== Style ===
Hellen van Meene has admitted in interviews that she pre-plans her photographs and carefully chooses the pose, garment and location for each photograph. She has stated that she chooses the location of older homes as a way of immortalizing them. Van Meene's work is recognizable not only by the consistent subject matter and lighting she uses, but also by the artist's consistent use of a square format and shots that are set up from a medium focal range. Some articles have also noted the painterly influence in van Meene's work, referencing the dream-like quality of the photographs and the softly-lit rooms in which her subjects are photographed. Van Meene's portraits are distinguishable by the detached appearance of her subjects and her style that straddles the border between creating a fantasy world and documenting contemporary youth.

== Collections ==
Van Meene's "The Years Shall Run Like Rabbits" is a play on the speed at which rabbits reproduce and the idea that unhappy or uncomfortable moments are fleeting. This collection was created from 1994–2015 and primarily features square portraits of adolescent girls.

From 1995–1998, van Meene worked on a collection called "Series Blanc" which featured a girl in a transparent white lace dress, lacking undergarments. This photograph prompts the viewer to question whether or not the young subject is aware of the sexual nature of the image or still too innocent to understand.

In 2005, the New York Times commissioned a portfolio of photographs of young Japanese women. The magazine is quoted as saying that "captured in van Meene's work is the less stylized [than kitsch or anime] (but still stylish) vernacular of everyday Japanese girlhood. It is a look at once fashionable and ingenious, tender but not without the occasional flush of teenage allure." Van Meene approached adolescent girls on the street in Tokyo and photographed them against nearby backdrops.

In 2010, van Meene began photographing dogs alongside her adolescent subjects. Maintaining the same attention to detail and planning as in her earlier portraits. Van Meene has stated that in this collection, she is less concerned with the sociological message in her work and more interested in curating "light, shape, posture, gaze and general mise-en-scene." She is also aware of her now-recognizable style and has noted that it is not the girls that make her work unique, but the way she styles them and uses light, gaze and posture to create a scene.

== Influence ==
Hellen van Meene's photographs have been compared to paintings by Dutch Masters such as Vermeer and Rembrandt for her use of natural light and the formal composition of the photographs. Other scholars have compared van Meene's portraits to those by Cindy Sherman, the differentiating feature being that van Meene's work focuses on other people as her subjects rather than the artist herself as Sherman did. Both create artificial scenes and use irony to undermine the authenticity of a photograph. The photographic documentation is used to frame a "performance event" as a constructed space, but one that provokes an emotional response to the staged scenario without context or commentary by the artist.

Hellen van Meene herself mentions Francesca Woodman as being an inspiration for her work. Woodman's work focuses entirely on the body, often omitting her subject's faces, however perhaps this speaks to the importance of what the bodies of van Meene's subjects communicate and the emphasis she places on this element.

== Exhibitions ==
Over the course of her 23-year career from 1994 to 2017, van Meene has had one-person exhibitions in Los Angeles, Amsterdam, London, Milan, Tokyo and at the Venice Biennale and has exhibited at Sadie Coles HQ in London (2000, 2008), The Museum of Contemporary Photography in Chicago (2002), Folkwang Museum in Essen (2007), and Fotomuseum Winterthur (2008). Her work has also been included in major group exhibitions like the Biennale for Architecture in Venice (2000), Fotografen in Nederland een Anthologie at Gemeente Museum Den Haag (2002), In Sight: Contemporary Dutch Photography from the Collection of the Stedelijk Museum at The Art Institute of Chicago (2005), Family Pictures at the Solomon R. Guggenheim Museum in New York (2007), Paris Photo in Carrousel du Louvre in Paris (2008), Faces in the Nederlands Fotomusem in Rotterdam (2015) and at Matthew Marks Gallery in New York, the Marc Foxx Gallery in LA, Le Case d'Arte in Milan, Galleria Laura Pecci in Milan, Galiere Paul Andiresse in Amsterdam and The Photographer's Gallery in London.

== Critical reception and recognition ==
Publications including Photo District News (PDN), i-D Magazine, TIME, Art Photography Now, The New York Times and The New Yorker have published articles about Hellen van Meene and reviewed a variety of her collections/exhibitions.

According to Scott Tillett at Photo District News, the Matthew Marks Gallery signed van Meene based on her "strong work, feeling that people perhaps respond to the painterly influence in her portraits." Similarly, Alastair Sooke wrote in the Telegraph, referring to van Meene's portraits as "meticulously composed portraits of young women...Vermeer-like in its enigmatic tranquility and sensuous evocation of texture and subtle light." Such comments that reference Dutch masters appear to be commonplace in reviews of van Meene's photography.

In another exhibition review, Christopher Miles notes that the photographs in van Meene's first solo US exhibition at The Marc Foxx Gallery "afford the viewer insight into a self knowledge being gained by the young women in the pictures...All images in this exhibition blur the boundaries between public and private moments, between voyeurism and innocent observation on the part of the photographer/viewer, and between distinctions as to whether the girls depicted are acting naturally, being posed, self-consciously posing themselves, or, more strangely, naturally assuming artificial poses."

Van Meene faced controversy in 2002 surrounding a photo in her Edinburgh exhibition which showed a young woman in her undergarments bent over the side of a bed. Though critics noted that this controversy was misplaced, it is understood that van Meene's photographs have an underlying sexual element to them and can create an uneasiness within the viewer.

In 2016, Van Meene was one of the recipients of the Royal Photographic Society Honorary Fellowship, which is awarded to distinguished people within the science or fine art of photography.

== Recent projects ==
Hellen van Meene's work was recently exhibited at the Hague Museum of Photography and at the Villa Mondrian in the Netherlands.

In 2018, Van Meene was the focus of an exhibit called "And everything goes on when you die" at Huis Marseille in Amsterdam. It showed a never before exhibited series of photos from the artist, and its subject matter centered around death, mourning, and renewed vitality.

Several of Van Meene's works were exhibited as part of the 2019 show "Make Believe" at the Museum of Fine Arts in Boston.

== Monographs ==
- Hellen van Meene: The Years Shall Run Like Rabbits, Aperture (2015) (ISBN 1597113174)
- Hellen Van Meene: Tout va disparaître, Schirmer/Mosel (2009) (ISBN 3829604173)
- Hellen Van Meene: New Work, Schirmer/Mosel (2007) (ISBN 3829602642)
- Hellen Van Meene: Portraits, Aperture (2005) (ISBN 1931788456)
- Hellen van Meene: Japan Series, Walther Konig (2003) (ISBN 3883755761)

== List of exhibitions ==
Exhibitions focused on or including works by Hellen Van Meene include:

- 2019: "Make Believe" at the Museum of Fine Arts
- 2018: "Hellen van Meene: And everything goes on when you die" at Huis Marseille
- 2018: "Leica Gallery Istanbul Hosts Hellen van Meene" at the Leica Gallery Istanbul
- 2017: "Terrains of the Body: Photography from the National Museum of Women in the Arts" at the Whitechapel Gallery
- 2015: "Faces Now: European Portrait Photography since 1990" at the Centre for Fine Arts
- 2012–2013: "Gaze Changing the Face of Portrait Photography" at the Istanbul Museum of Modern Art
- 2007–2008: "Girls on the Verge: Portraits of Adolescence" at The Art Institute of Chicago
