= SigFig =

SigFig may refer to:

- SigFig (company), a portfolio tracking and investment adviser referral service, previously known as Wikinvest
- Significant figures, the digits of a number that carry meaning contributing to its measurement resolution
