= Seedcamp =

Venture capital firm

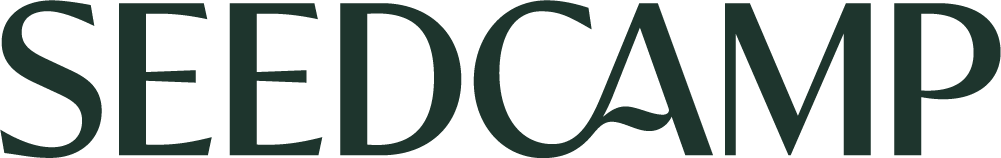
- Type: Limited liability company
- Industry: Venture capital
- Founded: May, 2007 (London, United Kingdom)
- Headquarters: 12 Little Portland Street, London W1W 8BJ, United Kingdom
- Key people: Reshma Sohoni, Carlos Espinal
- Products: Investments
- Website: www.seedcamp.com

Seedcamp is a European seed-stage venture capital fund, headquartered in London, launched in May 2007 by a group of 30 European investors. The fund's Managing Partners are Reshma Sohoni and Carlos Espinal MBE.

As of 2026, Seedcamp has a portfolio of over 550 companies, including Revolut, Wise, UiPath, Synthesia, Pleo and Fluidstack.

== History ==
Seedcamp was originally created by Saul Klein and Reshma Sohoni. Participating VCs and advisors in Seedcamp's launch included Index Ventures, Atomico Investments, Atlas Venture, Balderton Capital, TAG, Forsyth Group and Brown Rudnick. Carlos Espinal joined as Partner in 2010.

Seedcamp raised its first fund of €2.5 million in 2007, followed by a second fund of €5.2 million in 2010. In October 2017, both funds were acquired by publicly listed company Draper Esprit for £17.9 million (approximately $23.6M), delivering a reported 4x return to investors.

In 2014, Seedcamp closed Fund III at €20 million, enabling investments of up to €200,000 into rounds between €300,000 and €2 million.

In November 2017, Seedcamp announced the first close of Fund IV at £41 million, backed by 60 corporates, venture capitalists and fund of funds including Index Ventures, Atomico and the UK government-backed British Business Bank. The fund reached a final close of £60 million in May 2018.

In November 2020, Seedcamp closed Fund V at £78 million, backed by investors including British Patient Capital, Legal & General, LGT and OMERS.

In May 2023, Seedcamp closed Fund VI at $180 million (approximately €166 million), backed by over 200 institutions, angels and members of the Seedcamp Network, including LGT, Reference Capital, HarbourVest and Legal & General. The fund was almost double the size of Fund V, making it the firm's largest to date.

Seedcamp invests primarily at pre-seed and seed stages, writing first cheques between $350,000 and $1 million, and is sector-agnostic within software and technology, with a focus on artificial intelligence, cybersecurity, open-source software, healthtech, and fintech.

== Seedsummit ==
Seedcamp spearheaded Seedsummit along with key global partners: a platform aimed at making it easier for startup entrepreneurs to find the most active seed investors relevant to their business. Significantly, Seedcamp was able to sign up 21 European investors to agree on a standard term sheet for startups. Techcrunch presented this as a “historic move”.

== Performance and notable exits ==
In October 2016, Seedcamp announced it had returned its first fund of €2.5 million at almost 2x to investors.

In January 2017, Seedcamp sold a minority stake in portfolio company Wise (then TransferWise) in a secondary transaction, returning approximately 80 per cent of its second fund to investors. The deal was described at the time as one of the best European seed exits in recent years that was not an acquisition or IPO.

In October 2017, Seedcamp Funds I and II were acquired by Draper Esprit for £17.9 million (approximately $23.6 million), delivering a reported 4x return to investors.

In April 2021, portfolio company UiPath listed on the New York Stock Exchange under the ticker symbol PATH, raising $1.34 billion in one of the largest software IPOs in history.

In July 2021, portfolio company Wise listed on the London Stock Exchange via direct listing at a market capitalisation of approximately £8 billion ($11 billion), becoming the largest technology company to list in London at that time.

In November 2025, Lloyds Banking Group announced the acquisition of portfolio company Curve, a digital wallet provider, for a reported £120 million, with the deal expected to complete in the first half of 2026.

Other notable exits include: Mobclix bought by Velti for $50M, RentMineOnline bought by RealPage for $9.5M, Crashpadder acquired by Airbnb, and Talasim acquired by Jeeran.
