= TriNet =

American cloud-based professional employer organization

TriNet Group, Inc.
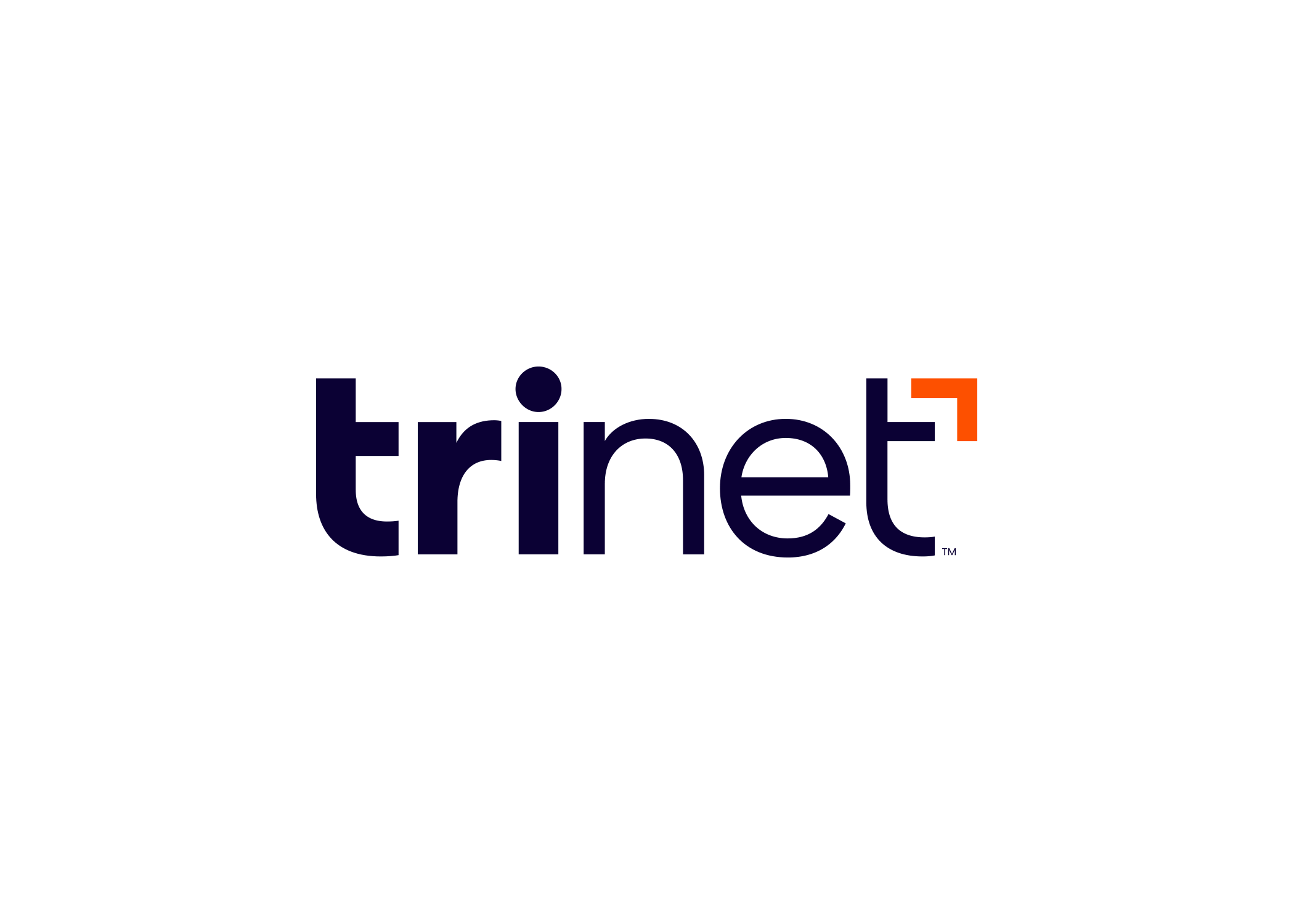
- Type: Public
- Traded as: NYSE: TNET; Russell 2000 component
- Industry: Professional employer organization
- Founded: 1988, San Leandro, California, United States
- Headquarters: Dublin, California, United States
- Key people: Burton Goldfield, President & CEO (2008–2024); Special Advisor (2024–); Mike Simonds, CEO (2024–)
- Revenue: ▲US$4.9 billion (2023)
- Operating income: ▼US$469 Million (2023)
- Net income: ▲US$355 million (2023)
- Total assets: ▲US$3.7 billion (2023)
- Number of employees: 3,622 (2019)
- Subsidiaries: TriNet Zenefits
- Website: www.trinet.com

TriNet Group, Inc. is a professional employer organization for small and medium-sized businesses. TriNet administers payroll and health benefits and advises clients on employment law compliance and risk reduction, acting in some cases as an outsourced human resources department. TriNet is headquartered in Dublin, California. TriNet partners with organizations between 3 and 2,500 employees.

Founded in 1988, TriNet offered basic employee benefits, dental coverage, life and disability insurance and employment law guidance. Since then, TriNet has broadened its offerings to add payroll services, Fortune-500 benefits, 401(k) guidance, worker's compensation, liability insurance, and strategic human resources support and services. The company also provides online tools such as web-hosted management portals for manager and employee self-service.

TriNet has been accredited by the Employer Services Assurance Corporation since 1995.

== History ==
TriNet was founded in 1988 by entrepreneur Martin Babinec in San Leandro, California. Babinec led TriNet through several acquisitions of smaller professional employer organizations, including Boston-based HR Logic Holdings, John Parry & Alexander and the Outsource Group of Walnut Creek, Calif.; E3 Group of Dallas; and Boston-based HR Logic Holdings.

The company went through its own rounds of equity financing, including an investment by U.K.-based staffing firm Select Holdings, LLC (later renamed as Vedior). In 2000, the company was incorporated as TriNet Group. In 2004, Vedior sold its minority interest in TriNet to General Atlantic, a growth equity firm.

In May 2008, Burton Goldfield joined the company as president and CEO. Babinec remained at the company as a director.

In March 2014 TriNet launched its initial public offering (IPO) on the New York Stock Exchange with ticker symbol TNET and became a public company.

== Acquisitions ==
TriNet acquired E3 Group, a Dallas-based professional employer organization, in 2003.

In 2006, TriNet purchased the Outsource Group, a human resources service provider.

TriNet acquired human resources outsourcing and consulting firm John Parry & Alexander in 2007.

The company acquired LMC Resources, a human resources advisor, in April 2008 and, in June 2009, completed its acquisition of Gevity (NASDAQ: GVHR), a human resources outsourcing company based in Bradenton, Florida.

In May 2012, TriNet completed its acquisition of ExpenseCloud. ExpenseCloud helps businesses manage expense reporting online and from mobile devices. The following month, the company announced in April 2012 that it had acquired AccordHR in Oklahoma City. A few months later, in October 2012, TriNet closed its acquisition of Strategic Outsourcing and became the largest, independent professional employer organization in the U.S.

In July 2013, the company acquired Ambrose Employer Group, a New York City-based professional employer organization.

In July 2020, TriNet acquired Little Bird HR. Little Bird HR is a professional employer organization based in New York City.

On February 15, 2022, Trinet closed its acquisition of Zenefits.

== Recognition ==
In the 1990s, TriNet was a member of the Inc. 500 Hall of Fame for five consecutive listings on the magazine's ranking of fastest growing, privately held American companies (#12 in 1995, #79 in 1996, #166 in 1997, #319 in 1998 and #381 in 1999). In 2008, TriNet ranked #3,369 in the Inc. 5000, as well as #13 in the East Bay Business Times list of fastest growing, privately held companies. TriNet repeated the Inc. 5000 honor in 2009, with a #2185 listing, and in 2010, at #1601.

In 2011, TriNet was recognized as a fast-growth company by Inc. Magazine for the fourth year in a row.

In 2012 and 2013, Ernst & Young named TriNet CEO Burton Goldfield finalist for Entrepreneur of the Year Award.

TriNet has been accredited by the Employer Services Assurance Corporation since 1995. This certification validates the solid financial performance of professional employer organizations, and the assurance of their employer-compliant operations and services, continually monitoring them for adherence to important financial, ethical, and operational standards.

In May 2015, TriNet was recognized as one of the top 50 B2B vendors in the United States by their customers. In the same year, TriNet is named one of the Bay Area's Best and Brightest Companies to Work For® by the National Association for Business Resources.

In 2017, TriNet was named one of the 100 Fastest-Growing Companies by Fortune magazine and one of Selling Power magazine's 50 Best Companies to Sell For, for the fourth consecutive year.
