= Burton Goldfield =

United States-born business executive

Burton M. Goldfield
- Born: Philadelphia, PA
- Education: Syracuse University, Syracuse, New York, Villanova University, Radnor Township, Delaware County, Pennsylvania
- Occupations: President/CEO, TriNet
- Known for: Business Development

Burton M. Goldfield is a United States-born business executive. He is the former president and CEO of TriNet; a cloud-based professional employer organization (PEO) for small and medium-sized businesses. He is profiled in San Francisco Business Times and also featured as the "Most Admired CEO" in the same publication. He is a regular contributor to Forbes Magazine and his articles feature issues relevant to SMBs.

== Early life and education ==
Born in Philadelphia, Pennsylvania, Goldfield received a bachelor's degree in biomedical engineering from Syracuse University in Syracuse, New York and an MBA from Villanova University in Radnor Township, Delaware County, Pennsylvania.

== Business career ==
Burton M. Goldfield has served as an executive in various capacities for more than 25 years. He started his executive career at CGS Scientific Corporation in 1979 where he served as executive vice president until 1988. He briefly worked at Computer Command and Control Company as vice president of sales and marketing in 1988, before joining Rational Software in 1989.

At Rational Software, Burton played a critical role in growing the company's domestic and international sales capabilities. Following Rational's acquisition by IBM in 2002, he continued to market and sell Rational products globally as vice president worldwide sales at IBM. After IBM, Burton served as the senior vice president of worldwide field operations at Hyperion Solutions from 2004 to 2006. He was then CEO of Ketera Technologies from 2006 to 2008 before assuming his current role at TriNet.

In 2008, Burton became the president and CEO of TriNet (NYSE: TNET); a California-based HR outsourcing company. Within his first three years at TriNet, Burton doubled the company's revenue by using his years of experience in executive-level sales, operations and management.

Burton has contributed articles to Forbes magazine and other publications with particular focus on SMBs, entrepreneurship and HR topics. He serves on the regional board of the National Parks Conservation Association (NPCA). as well as the board of DHI (formerly known as Dice); a technology recruitment platform.

In December 2014, Burton Goldfield was recognized as "CEO of the year" by CEO World Awards for his contributions in transforming TriNet into a large cloud-based HR provider and PEO. As of August 2016, he is reported to own approximately US$3 million worth of TriNet Group shares.

== See also ==
- TriNet
