= Parker Conrad =

American businessman (born 1980)

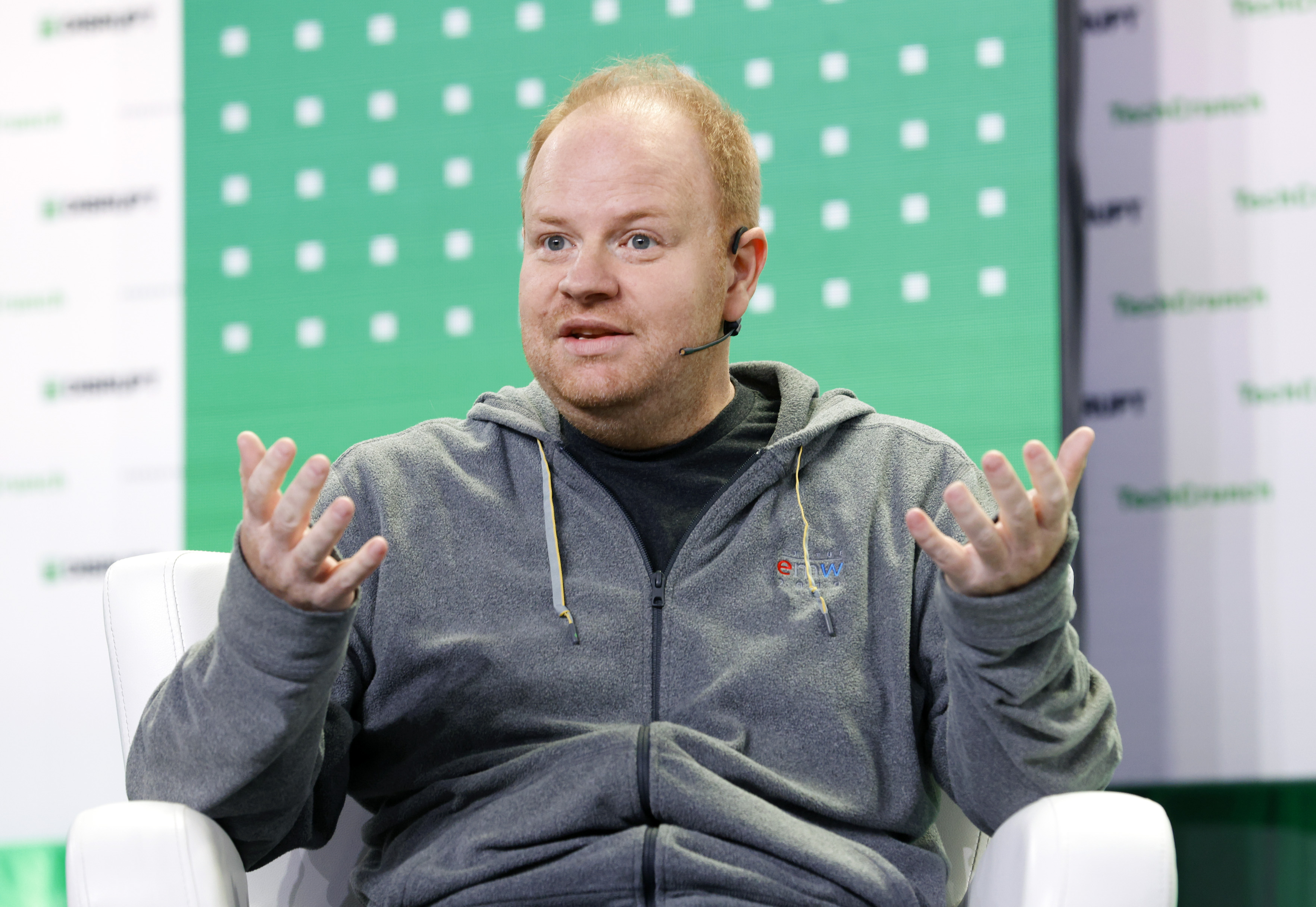
- Conrad in 2022
- Born: Parker Rouse Conrad; 1980 (age 45–46); New York City, United States
- Education: The Collegiate School; Harvard University
- Occupation: Entrepreneur
- Years active: 2000s–present
- Known for: Co-founder of SigFig, Zenefits and Rippling
- Title: CEO of Rippling
- Spouse: Alexandra MacRae (m. 2011)
- Children: 2

Parker Conrad (born 1980) is an American entrepreneur. He has co-founded three startup companies: SigFig, Zenefits and Rippling. He is the former CEO of both SigFig and Zenefits, and is the CEO of Rippling, a cloud-based human resources platform.

== Early life and education ==
Parker Conrad was born in 1980 in New York City to Ellen Rouse Conrad, a president and founder of the non-profit environmental group the Bedford 2020 Coalition, and Winthrop B. Conrad, Jr., a now retired senior partner at the New York law firm Davis Polk & Wardwell. Growing up on the Upper East Side, Parker Conrad attended the prestigious Upper West Side preparatory school The Collegiate School, and spent nearly two years during high school studying the neurobiology of sea snails. This research ultimately won him $20,000 and third place nationally in the Westinghouse Talent Search. Despite this, Parker admits that his high school grades were generally mediocre.

In the fall of 1998, Conrad began studying at Harvard University, where he was managing editor of The Harvard Crimson. Conrad cites his time at the paper as a stressful period where, due to the time demands of the paper, he didn't go to many classes and failed out of school, an experience he describes as "humiliating and shocking". Forced to take a leave of absence, he spent a year working for the Arkansas Democrat-Gazette before returning to Harvard. He graduated in 2003 with an AB degree in Chemistry.

== Career ==
=== Amgen and Sigfig ===
After graduating, Conrad became a product manager at Amgen, a biotechnology firm in California. While at Amgen, Conrad co-founded a portfolio-management startup called Wikinvest (now SigFig) with Mike Sha. The company launched in 2007 in San Francisco and was tailored for retail investors. Conrad was co-CEO, before leaving the company in 2012 after a falling out with Sha.

=== Zenefits ===
In 2012, he joined the Y Combinator program, taking on Laks Srini from SigFig as co-founder of a new company. Using $20,000 in savings and inspired by the recent launch of the Affordable Care Act and his own experience as a cancer patient, Conrad launched Zenefits in September 2012. The software company focused on health insurance and payroll, and was incorporated in January 2013. The company offered free human resources software to small businesses, and was a broker when companies used the service to purchase health insurance for its employees. It quickly took off, receiving millions in early funding rounds from venture capital firms such as Andreessen Horowitz and Institutional Venture Partners.

In 2014, Zenefits was named the fastest-growing startup of the year. After only two years of existence, the company had 1,600 employees, 10,000 customers, and a $4.5 billion valuation. In 2015, Conrad was listed as Number 20 on Fortune's 40 Under Forty list. Also in 2015, he ranked #22 on Forbes' America's Richest Entrepreneurs Under 40 list.

In the fall of 2015, Zenefits came under scrutiny for allegedly failing to comply with state health insurance regulations; the company was subject to an investigation by the website BuzzFeed News. On 8 February 2016, Conrad resigned from Zenefits after it was discovered the company used unlicensed brokers to sell health insurance in multiple states. He also left the Zenefits board. In the aftermath of the investigation, Conrad's replacement as CEO, former COO David O. Sacks announced that the valuation of the company would be halved and investors' positions "trued up" in an effort at rectification, while 10% of employees accepted an offer of a two-month separation package. In October 2017, without admitting or denying guilt, Conrad agreed to pay a fine to the U.S. Securities and Exchange Commission to settle charges of misleading investors about regulatory compliance.

=== Sacks feud ===
In the years following his ousting from Zenefits, Conrad and Sacks developed a "long-simmering feud," according to Bloomberg. Conrad has alleged that both a16z and Sacks waged a proxy war in the media to ruin his image. Saying there was immense pressure from the board for him to resign, he has also stated that he, the board, and Sacks agreed on a friendly exit, and that he was shocked when Sacks issued a different press release than the one they had agreed to. In July 2024, a Twitter exchange between Sacks and Conrad received coverage in the press. Sacks had accused the Democratic Party of forcing Joe Biden to drop from the presidential race in a "coup", with Conrad responding that "let me tell you, coups are this man’s specialty." The exchange started a heated conversation among venture capitalists.

=== Rippling ===
Six weeks after resigning from Zenefits, Conrad began working on a new company. In April 2016, he and Prasanna Sankar co-founded Rippling. With Sankar as CTO and Conrad as CEO, the company was in stealth mode in Conrad's home in San Francisco for two years, with him and Sankar building software to handle employee matters such as payroll, benefits, and onboarding. With Rippling operating as a cloud-based human resources platform, by the fall of 2017, it had 14 employees. The company grew to 60 employees in 2018.

With Conrad owning an estimated 22% stake in the company, the startup raised an additional $250 million in May 2022, with its value estimated at $11.25 billion by private investors. Rippling launched an international payroll product in 2022. Also in 2022, it released its Finance Cloud software, which built on its software related to IT and human resources. In 2022, Conrad claimed he personally managed all of Rippling's internal administration himself, including payroll, using Rippling's own software. During the bank run on Silicon Valley Bank (SVB) in 2023, Rippling's funds at SVB were frozen, making the company temporarily unable to complete payroll transactions for its customers. Conrad and Rippling raised $500 million in 12 hours to cover the paychecks, partly from investors and partly by liquidating money market funds with JPMorgan. By 2023, in total, it had raised $1.2 billion from investors such as Kleiner Perkins and Sequoia. At the start of 2025, Forbes estimated Conrad's personal wealth at $2 billion, ranking him #1623 on its 2024 Billionaires list.

== Personal life ==
Conrad and his wife Alexandra MacRae first met at camp as middle-schoolers, and later reconnected at college. They married in June 2011 and live with their family in Mission District, San Francisco. Conrad was diagnosed, treated, and cleared of testicular cancer at the age of 24.

== See also ==
- List of The Harvard Crimson people
- List of Collegiate School (New York City) alumni
- List of Internet entrepreneurs
