= Widline Cadet =

Photographer

- Born: 1992 (age 33–34); Pétion-Ville, Haiti
- Education: BA, City College of New York; MFA, Syracuse University
- Known for: Photography

Widline Cadet (born 1992) is a Los Angeles-based Haitian artist. Her work deals with such subjects as diaspora, family, and Black womanhood.

== Early life and education ==
Widline Cadet was born in Pétion-Ville, Haiti, in 1992. In 2002, at age 10, she immigrated to the United States, where she grew up in New York City's Washington Heights neighborhood.

At a young age, Cadet was interesting in pursuing a career in animation, but she eventually turned to photography instead. In 2013, she obtained a bachelor's in studio art with a focus on photography from the City College of New York. She then graduated with a master's in fine art from Syracuse University in 2020.

== Career ==
Previously working out of New York, Cadet is now based in Los Angeles.

Her photography deals with diaspora, displacement, family, memory, and Black womanhood. She often documents her own family and friends, as well as strangers.

Notable series produced by Cadet include Home Bodies, which began in 2013 and explores her family lineage in Haiti; Seremoni Disparisyon (Ritual [Dis]Appearance), which began in 2017 and addresses Black feminine identity and visibility; and Soft, which also began in 2017 and captures visitors to New York City parks.

In 2018, she was an artist in residence at the Skowhegan School of Painting and Sculpture, followed by a 2020–2021 artist residency at the Studio Museum in Harlem. In 2020, she received the Museum of Contemporary Photography's Snider Prize.

Her photography has been featured in various publications including Aperture, the New Yorker, the New York Times Magazine, and the Financial Times. Her piece Seremoni Disparisyon No. 1 (Ritual [Dis]Appearance #1) appeared on the cover of Edwidge Danticat's 2024 collection We're Alone.

Cadet's first solo gallery show, Se Sou Ou Mwen Mete Espwa m (I Put All My Hopes On You), was held at New York's Deli Gallery in 2021. The Milwaukee Art Museum hosts her first solo museum show in the United States, "Currents 40: Widline Cadet," in 2026.

In 2025, Cadet's work is included in Narratives in Focus: Selections from PAMM's Collection, a photography group show at the Pérez Art Museum Miami, Florida. Her work was also included in the Made in L.A. 2025 biennial at the Hammer Museum, in California.

== Collections ==
Institutions that hold her work include the Whitney Museum, the Museum of Contemporary Photography, Huis Marseille, Museum for Photography, the Los Angeles County Museum of Art, the Pérez Art Museum Miami, the Milwaukee Art Museum, and the Princeton University Art Museum.
