= Administrative services organization =

An administrative services organization (ASO) is an organization that provides outsourced solutions to meet the administrative and HR needs of the client, with the client retaining all employment-related risks and liabilities. The term ASO was established by the PEO industry in the late 1990s in order to distinguish between selective administrative support and full-scale PEO services. The principal difference between the two types of service is that, in an ASO arrangement, the employer remains the employer of record for tax purposes. Ultimately, with this structure, tax and insurance filings are done through the administrative firm, but under the client company's employer identification number. All W-2 and workers' compensation policies remain the responsibility of the employer and not the administrative firm.

Some of the more common administrative services offered are payroll processing, payroll administration, benefits administration, and corporate benefits.

Payroll services include- W-2 processing, tax filing services, direct deposit, wage garnishment, new hire reporting, standard & custom reports, HRIS, expense reporting, employee time & attendance, paycards, pay as you go workers comp, 401(k) administration, & unemployment Cost Control.

Benefits administration includes- managing COBRA, HRA/ HSAs, FSAs and transit pre-tax plans, bill payment/ premium reconciliation, & benefits enrollment.

Corporate benefits include- organizing/ negotiating health insurance, group dental, STD, LTD, life, etc.

== Benefits ==
The benefits of an ASO are not easily quantifiable. Administrative firms performing ASO duties conceptually save business owners time and money through economies of scale. Some businesses, especially small businesses or start-up companies, are not prepared for the administrative duties involved with running a business. The knowledge and capabilities of small and mid-sized businesses are usually limited to occupational expertise, not legal or administrative expertise.

One of the most significant advantages of using an ASO is the benefits from cost saving techniques and bargaining abilities that the ASO can provide due to their large number of workforce employees.

ASOs are built for larger companies that need the actual functions of payroll, workers' compensation, health and wellness benefits and HR support and Services done for them. Typically companies over 100 employees find value in an ASO model. Although the ASO and PEO business models are somewhat similar, an ASO does not include co-employment.
