= Zenefits =

American human resources company

YourPeople, Inc.
- Trade name: TriNet Zenefits
- Type: Subsidiary
- Industry: Human resource management
- Founded: February 18, 2013; 13 years ago
- Founders: Parker Conrad; Laks Srini
- Headquarters: San Francisco, California, United States
- Area served: United States
- Key people: Jay Fulcher (CEO)
- Revenue: ▲US$43.5 million (2016)
- Number of employees: 500 (2019)
- Parent: TriNet
- Website: www.zenefits.com

TriNet Zenefits (legally known as YourPeople, Inc. and previously known as Zenefits) is a technology company based in San Francisco that provides cloud-based software as a service to companies for managing their human resources, with a focus on payroll and health insurance coverage. The company was founded in 2013.

== History ==
Zenefits was started by Parker Conrad and Laks Srini to help startups and small businesses find insurance quotes and manage employee benefits in one place. It officially launched on February 18, 2013.

In January 2014, the company announced the addition of commuter spending, flexible spending, and 401(k) support, to replace functions usually handled by companies' human resources departments. In July, the company announced support for stock options in its cloud HR platform.

In May 2015, Zenefits announced it had raised $500 million from investors, including Fidelity Management, TPG, and Comcast Ventures, at a valuation of $4.5 billion.

=== Service issues ===
In 2014 and 2015, Zenefits had many publicly noted issues and admitted mistakes in its delivery of potentially life-impacting health insurance coverage due to its alleged haphazard setup and delivery of insurance products. In one particular instance, for example, there were several months of delays and multiple repeated issues and glitches in obtaining the correct health insurance coverage for a company in Pennsylvania, leading to gaps in coverage and denied or delayed medical care for some of their employees and families. Over a dozen other customers of Zenefits came forward, both publicly and anonymously, with stories of similar issues for a BuzzFeed investigation into these complaints published in July 2015.

These reported mistakes were mainly attributed to the chaos, confusion and turnover surrounding Zenefits' rapid growth and its buggy, inefficient software. In a BuzzFeed article which interviewed more than a dozen current and former users of Zenefits at that time, customers were quoted as saying that Zenefits turned the benefits process into an "expensive nightmare" and ended up being worse than the original manual, paper-based process it was supposed to replace. Customers would often have to revert to manual processes and paper forms to obtain benefits due to frequent software bugs and brokerage issues at Zenefits during this time.

=== Compliance issues ===
In 2016, an internal legal investigation at Zenefits found the company's licensing was out of compliance and that Parker Conrad, CEO had created a browser extension to skirt training requirements for selling insurance in California. After self-reporting these issues, Zenefits hired an independent third party to do an internal audit of its licensing controls and sent the report to all 50 states. The California Department of Insurance as well as the Massachusetts Division of Insurance began investigations of their own based on Zenefits' report. Parker Conrad resigned as CEO and director in February and COO David O. Sacks was named as his replacement.

=== Workplace culture ===
On February 26, 2016, Zenefits laid off 250 people, about 17 percent of its employees. In June the company laid off another 9 percent (106 additional people).

=== Regulatory settlements and fines ===
In July, Zenefits reached its first state regulatory settlement with Tennessee for $62,500, four months after the company's initial self-reporting of compliance issues to the states in which they had been operating. Settlements with additional states followed. On November 28, Zenefits was fined $7 million by California's insurance regulator for allegedly disobeying insurance laws.

In 2017, the company was fined $1.2 million for violations against New York Insurance Law.

=== Transformation and further layoffs ===
On February 3, 2017, Jay Fulcher was appointed as new CEO and Chairman. On February 9, Zenefits announced it would be laying off 45% of its workforce as a way to "move toward an operating model that is sustainable and better reflects the needs of our current business" as noted by Fulcher in a memo sent to employees. In September, the company changed its business model from an insurance broker to a SaaS software platform for brokers, offering HR, payroll, benefits and wellness applications to small businesses and insurance brokers. It also announced it was partnering with Atlanta-based broker OneDigital to offer broker partner-based regional support. OneDigital became the first member of Zenefits' new Broker Partner Program.

In October 2018, the company began offering a well-being product in conjunction with American businesswoman Arianna Huffington's wellness company Thrive Global.

In April 2020, Zenefits laid off 15% of its staff due to the COVID-19 pandemic.

In January 2021, the company launched a healthcare plan shopping feature on its platform.

=== Decline and acquisition ===
In March 2021, the company entered a financing agreement with private equity firm Francisco Partners that gave the firm control of the company. Forbes reported that the company's value had declined significantly by that time.

In February 2022, Zenefits was acquired by Francisco Partners-owned TriNet and was renamed to TriNet Zenefits.

== Financials ==
Zenefits has been valued as high as $4.5 billion; it has received $583 million in venture-capital funding from investors such as Andreessen Horowitz, Brendan F. Wallace, Venrock, TPG, I.V.P., and Fidelity.
