= Huis Marseille, Museum for Photography =

- Huis Marseille, Museum voor Fotografie
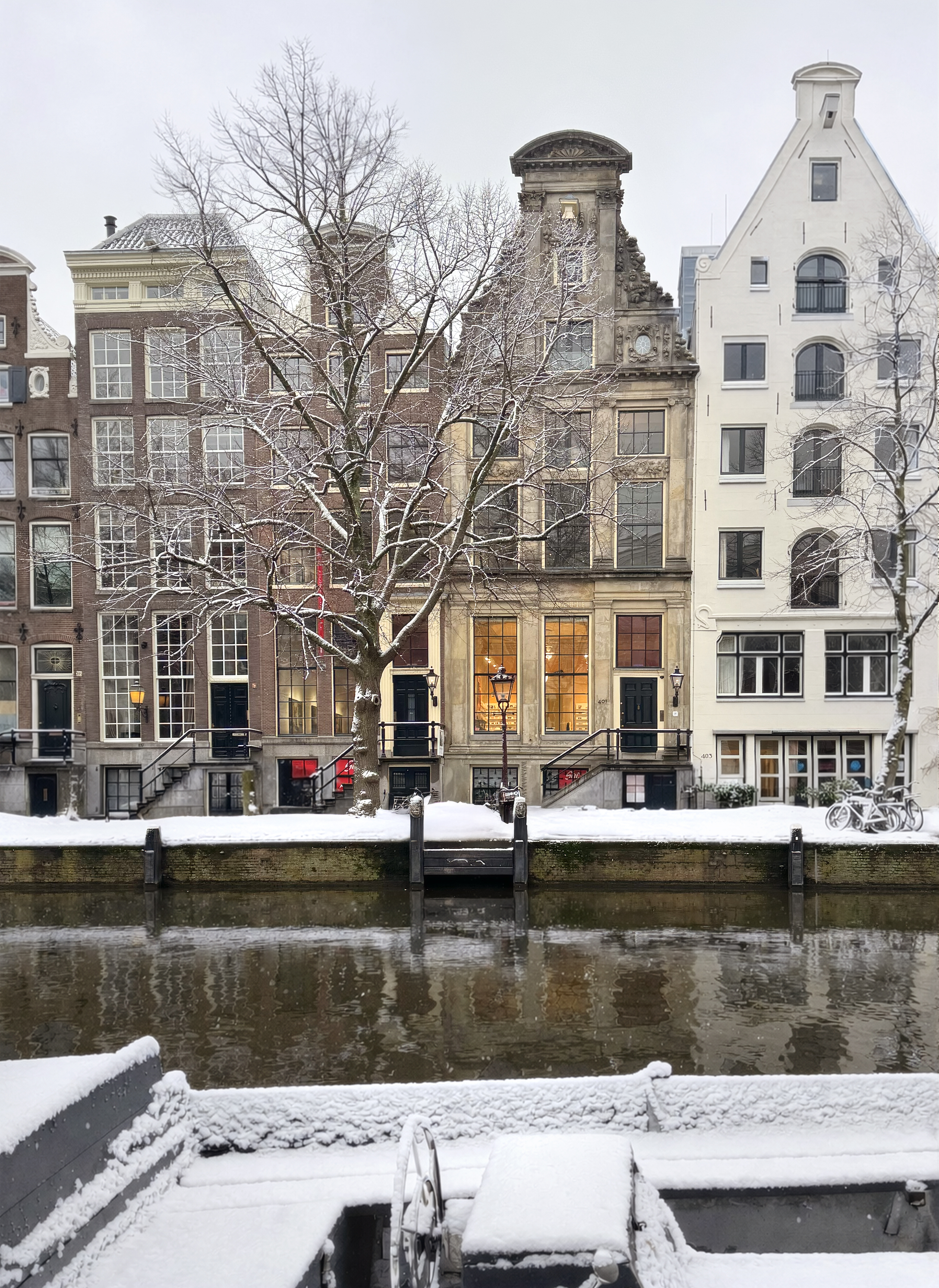

- Location within the city center of Amsterdam
- Established: Built in 1665, opened to the public in 1999
- Location: Keizersgracht 401; Amsterdam, Netherlands
- Coordinates: 52°22′04″N 4°53′06″E
- Type: photography museum
- Collection size: 950
- Visitors: 65,305 (2025)
- Founder: Jos de Pont
- Director: Nanda van den Berg
- Curators: Nanda van den Berg, Désirée Kroep
- Public transit access: tram 2 and 12 (Keizersgracht) metro 52 (Rokin) bus (Elandsgracht)
- Website: http://www.huismarseille.nl/en/

Huis Marseille is a photography museum in Amsterdam. Established in 1999, it was the first museum in the Netherlands devoted exclusively to photography as an art form. The museum is housed in two 17th-century monumental canal houses at Keizersgracht 401, dating from 1665, and is located within the Canal District, a designated UNESCO World Heritage Site.

The museum offers a diverse exhibition program and stands out for the unique historical ambiance of its two seventeenth-century canal houses. Many original details have been preserved, including ceiling paintings, stucco work, marble finishes, and a Louis XIV-style room featuring a red interior; the building was restored and the museum extended into the adjacent building in 2007–2013.

Huis Marseille deviates from the traditional "white cube" layout. Its authentic, light-filled spaces enhance the presentation and experience of the photographic works. In addition, the museum features a photography library, a specialized photobook store, and a canal garden with a historic garden house.

== History ==
The museum Huis Marseille takes its name from the building in which it is housed. The monumental canal house is built around 1665 for the French merchant Isaac Focquier. On the building's classical façade, Focquier placed a stone depicting the layout of the French port city of Marseille. The ship he had outfitted in Marseille, which brought him to Amsterdam, made him a wealthy man.

For several years, he was a member of Amsterdam's College van Commercie (College of Commerce), where his experience as a successful merchant allowed him to influence trade matters. His involvement with the commission coincided with the construction of his house on the Keizersgracht, underscoring his status as a respectable figure. Focquier had distinguished himself and risen to the highest circles of Amsterdam, an elite class of affluent, self-assured men immortalized in group portraits such as Rembrandt’s Syndics of the Drapers' Guild (De Staalmeesters).

== The houses ==
Three hundred years later, the original seventeenth-century layout of the house—consisting of a 'front' segment, a courtyard, a 'back' segment and garden—is still largely intact.

In the current garden room hangs an original ceiling painting from 1730, specially created for the house by Jacob de Wit, the leading decorator of the 18th century. The work depicts Apollo, seated on the clouds, flanked by Minerva and the nine Muses. The ceiling piece was housed in the Rijksmuseum for many years but returned to its original location in 2004, after a thorough restoration, on loan from the Royal Archaeological Society (Koninklijk Oudheidkundig Genootschap).

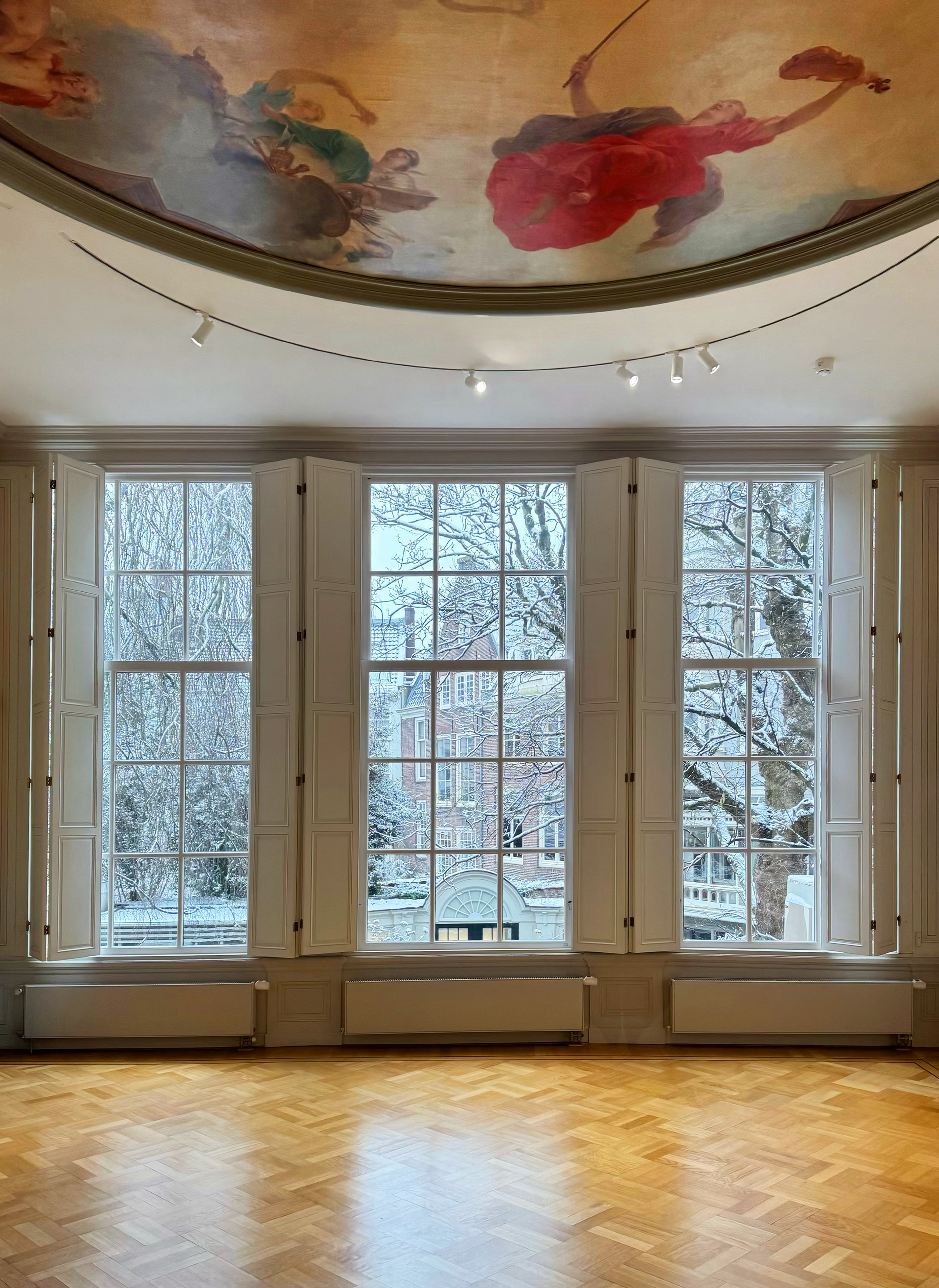
Huis Marseille, Museum for Photography

In September 2013, the museum was expanded to include the neighboring building at Keizersgracht 399, providing the museum with more exhibition space, a larger library, and its own collection storage. The first exhibition in the expanded Huis Marseille took place in September 2013. Since the expansion in 2013, Huis Marseille, Museum for Photography, consists of two connected buildings. Both buildings have five floors accessible to visitors, with a total of fourteen different exhibition rooms.

The most striking feature of the extension is a Louis XIV-style room from the early 18th century. Over the decades, the room has featured various colors. Beneath the last cream-colored layer of paint, olive green, earth-toned, and scarlet pigments were found. This particular shade of red is almost unique in the Netherlands in a reference room. In consultation with the Bureau for Monuments and Archaeology (Bureau Monumenten en Archeologie), it was decided to restore the detailed red wall and ceiling moldings to their original state.

== Selected exhibitions ==
Some of the exhibitions that have taken place at Huis Marseille:

- 2007: David Goldblatt: Intersections
- 2007: Jacqueline Hassink: The Power Show
- 2009: Edward Burtynsky: Oil
- 2011: Scarlett Hooft Graafland: Soft Horizons
- 2012: Yasusuke Ota: The Abandoned Animals of Fukushima
- 2012: Viviane Sassen: In and out of fashion
- 2013: Rob Hornstra: Gouden jaren
- 2014: Apartheid & After
- 2014: Taco Anema: In Conference. Portraits of Dutch Administrative Boards
- 2015: Cor Jaring: Cor was hier
- 2016: Stephan Shore: Retrospective
- 2016: Dana Lixenberg: Imperial Courts
- Eddo Hartmann: Setting the Stage: Pyongyang, North Korea, Part 2
- 2017: Jeff Cowen: Photoworks
- 2017: Jamie Hawkesworth: Landscape with Tree
- 2017: Joscha Steffens: Teen Spirit Island
- 2018: Harold Strak & Willem van Zoetendaal: Amsterdam Stuff
- 2019: Helga Paris, Céline van Balen, Esther Kroon & Julie Greve: Futures Past & Present
- 2019: Berenice Abbott: Portraits of Modernity
- 2019: Elspeth Diederix: When Red Disappears
- 2019: Deana Lawson
- 2020: Jean-Luc Mylayne: The Autumn of Paradise
- 2020: Farah Al Qasimi, Frida Orupabo, Coco Capitán, Myriam Boulos: Infinite Identities
- 2021: Vincent Delbrouck: Champú
- 2021: Sohrab Hura: Spill
- 2021: Luc Delahaye: Le Village
- 2021: Charlotte Dumas: Ao
- 2022: Lindokuhle Sobekwa: Umkhondo. Tracing memory
- 2022: Dana Lixenberg: Polaroid 54/59/79
- 2022: Sabelo Mlangeni: Isivumelwano
- 2022: Jochen Lempert: Natural sources
- 2022: Nhu Xuan Hua: Hug of a swan
- 2023: Pérez Siquier: Colours and Contrasts of Spain
- 2023: Variétés. Photography and the Avant-garde: Man Ray, Berenice Abbott, Germaine Krull, Florence Henri and others
- 2023: Widline Cadet: Take This with You / Pran sa avèk ou
- 2023: Tarrah Krajnak: Shadowings. A Catalogue of Attitudes for Estranged Daughters
- 2024: Lisa Oppenheim: Spolia
- 2024: Deborah Turbeville: Photocollage
- 2024: Jeff Cowen: Provence Works
- 2024: Awoiska van der Molen: The Humanness of Our Lonely Selves
- 2025: Revoir Paris: Paris through the lens of the Séeberger brothers (1900–1907)
- 2025: Memento: Photography, interrupted
- 2025: Kusukazu Uraguchi: Shima no Ama
- 2025: Michella Bredahl: Rooms We Made Safe
- 2026: Designed World: Through the Eyes of Tata Ronkholz (1940–1997)
- 2026: Yumna Al-Arashi: Body as Resistance
- 2026: Martine Gutierrez: Wunderkind
