= Dan-el Padilla Peralta =

American classical scholar

Dan-el Padilla Peralta (also Dan-el Padilla) is a Dominican-born classicist. He is a professor at Arizona State University who researches and teaches the Roman Republic and early Empire, as well as classical reception in contemporary American and Latin American cultures.

== Early life ==
Padilla immigrated with his family to the United States in 1989, when he was four years old. Padilla's father returned to the Dominican Republic while his mother remained, raising Padilla and his infant brother in homeless shelters in New York City. Padilla's younger brother, Yando, is a United States citizen by virtue of his birth in the United States.

In 1994, Padilla, then living with his family in a shelter in Bushwick, Brooklyn, met photographer Jeff Cowen. With Cowen's help, Padilla received a scholarship to attend the Collegiate School in Manhattan. At Collegiate, Padilla learned Greek, Latin, and French, and participated in debate tournaments.

Padilla applied for early admission to Princeton University and was accepted in December 2001. He admitted on his application that he did not have legal status in the United States. Princeton awarded him a full scholarship out of its own funds because his immigration status made him ineligible for federal aid programs. At Princeton, Padilla earned a 3.9 grade point average and was named salutatorian of his class. He majored in classics, studying ancient Rome and Greece, and often took twice the normal course load. He was the 2006 Latin salutatorian of Princeton University, and at the commencement ceremony he delivered the traditional address in Latin.

In early 2006, Padilla received Princeton's Daniel M. Sachs Class of 1960 Graduating Scholarship, a two-year scholarship for a second bachelor's degree at Worcester College of the University of Oxford. Attending Oxford would require Padilla to leave the United States, upon which he would likely be unable to return legally due to having no visa. Due to his having been in the United States unlawfully, if discovered, he would have been unable to apply for ten years. Further, without a work visa he would be unable to find work in the United States as a scholar and professor, his intended occupation. Padilla raised $10,000 from his friends for legal support and, in early April 2006, applied for a visa under a United States program allowing visa grants to undocumented immigrants under "extraordinary circumstances". Despite personal appeals from Senator Hillary Clinton (whose husband, Bill Clinton called President George W. Bush on the subject), Charles Schumer, Charlie Rangel, Jane Harman, Mark Dayton, and other members of the United States House of Representatives and Senate, the deans of the Harvard Law School and the Woodrow Wilson School, asking Michael Chertoff and Emilio Gonzalez to personally review Padilla's file, Citizenship and Immigration Services (the agency now responsible for issuing visas) declined to consider his application. In April 2007 Padilla was issued a one-year H-1B Visa allowing him to work as a research assistant at Princeton while attending Oxford.

== Career ==
In June 2014, Padilla received a Ph.D. from Stanford University in classics, and, in Fall 2014, became a fellow of the Society of Fellows in the Humanities at Columbia University. As a Fellow he was a lecturer in classics at Columbia. Padilla Peralta was featured in the New York Times Magazine on February 2, 2021, in the article "He Wants to Save Classics From Whiteness. Can the Field Survive?".

After a two-year postdoctoral stint at Columbia's Society of Fellows, Padilla returned to become an assistant professor at Princeton. In August 2026, Padilla will leave Princeton University and begin teaching at Arizona State University's School of International Letters and Cultures.

== Immigration advocacy and memoir ==
Along with his academic and political supporters Padilla campaigned unsuccessfully in 2006 for passage of the DREAM Act, which would have allowed high school graduates who had been undocumented immigrants since childhood, to become legal residents if they agreed to attend college or served in the United States Armed Forces. The bill had been introduced several times since 2001, but never obtained enough support to overcome filibusters.

Padilla's story attracted the attention of Hollywood, leading to interest in movie rights and a book deal. Padilla's memoir, Undocumented: A Dominican Boy's Odyssey from a Homeless Shelter to the Ivy League, was published by Penguin Press on July 28, 2015.

== Writings ==
=== Books ===
- Classicism and Other Phobias. Princeton University Press. 2025.
- Divine Institutions: Religions and Community in the Middle Roman Republic. Princeton University Press. 2020.
- Undocumented: A Dominican Boy's Odyssey from a Homeless Shelter to the Ivy League. Penguin Books, 2015.

=== Edited volumes ===
- Rome, Empire of Plunder. The Dynamics of Cultural Appropriation, ed. by Matthew P. Loar, Carolyn MacDonald, and Dan-el Padilla Peralta. Cambridge University Press, 2017.

=== Articles and book chapters ===
- "Some thoughts on AIA-SCS 2019". Medium. January 7, 2019.
- Peralta, Dan-El Padilla (Fall 2018). "Ecology, Epistemology, and Divination in Cicero De Divinatione 1.90–94'". Arethusa. 51 (3): 237–67. doi:10.1353/are.2018.0011. S2CID 166722471.
- Loar, Matthew P.; MacDonald, Carolyn; Padilla Peralta, Dan-el, eds. (2017). "Circulation's Thousand Connectivities". Rome, Empire of Plunder. The Dynamics of Cultural Appropriation. Cambridge: Cambridge University Press. pp. 261–70.
- "From Damocles to Socrates: The Classics in/of Hip-Hop". Eidolon. 2015.
- "Barbarians Inside the Gate: Fears of immigration in ancient Rome and today". Eidolon. 2015.
- "The worst of US immigration policy is reflected in the Dominican Republic". The Guardian. July 24, 2015.
