= SigFig (company) =

Financial technology company

- Industry: Financial technology
- Founded: 2006 as Wikinvest
- Founders: Parker Conrad, Michael Sha
- Headquarters: San Francisco, United States
- Products: Customer engagement software

SigFig (formerly Wikinvest) is a financial technology company based in San Francisco that builds robo-advisory and customer engagement software. SigFig's robo advice platform is available directly to consumers via web and mobile app. SigFig also white-labels its platforms to financial institutions, including Wells Fargo and UBS.

== History ==
=== Wikinvest ===
Wikinvest was founded in 2006 by Parker Conrad and Michael Sha. As of November 2008, the site covered over 1800 companies and over 180 economic issues, and had around 1400 contributors. Wikinvest was a winner in the 2008 SXSW Interactive Web Awards.

Wikinvest also provided a syndication service for financial bloggers, the Wikinvest Wire. Additionally, the site's WikiCharts feature allowed financial charts to be annotated as well as embedded in other websites.

Contributions fell under two main categories, companies and concepts. The former offered financial and business analysis on individual corporations, whereas the latter examined trends in broader economic issues. In addition to being an information resource for the public, the site's financial analysis has also been cited in mainstream business publications such as the Wall Street Journal.

=== SigFig ===
In May 2012, Wikinvest announced that it would be a portfolio tracking and investment adviser referral service with a new name, SigFig.

As of 2 June 2012, Wikinvest had 400,000 users. Parker Conrad and Michael Sha said that Wikinvest would eventually be phased out.

As of November 2015, the Wikinvest website continued to work, but the mobile apps no longer functioned. Accounts are now mirrored to SigFig.com with the same username and password as the Wikinvest website, but with new, additional features available.

Beginning in 2019, SigFig began to expand into the retail banking space with the launch of SigFig Atlas, a customer needs data discovery, sales enablement, and conversational intelligence software platform.

SigFig was also named the top-performing robo-advisor for 2016-2020 investment returns by Condor Capital (formerly Backend Benchmarking) in The Robo Report.

=== Tandems ===
In September 2025, SigFig announced it would rebrand to Tandems, launching an AI-native wealth operating system called WealthOS for financial institutions.
