= Employer of Record =

Third-party employment service provider

Employer of Record (EOR) is a third-party organization that formally acts as the legal employer of workers on behalf of another company, while the company directs the workers' day-to-day activities. The EOR assumes responsibility for legal and administrative employment tasks, such as payroll, taxes, benefits, and compliance with local labor laws. The arrangement most often used to employ workers in countries where the client company has no registered legal entity. Its legal treatment varies by jurisdiction.

== Overview ==
An Employer of Record is responsible for handling various employment-related administrative functions. These responsibilities typically include processing payroll, withholding and remitting taxes, managing benefits, and ensuring compliance with local labor regulations. The EOR serves as the formal employer for legal purposes, while the client company retains control over the day-to-day management of the workers.

EOR services are frequently utilized by companies that seek to employ workers in countries where they do not have a local subsidiary. The EOR allows businesses to operate in foreign markets by ensuring that all employment practices comply with local laws. The arrangement also allows companies to avoid the complexities of setting up and maintaining a legal entity in each jurisdiction where they wish to hire employees.

== Applications ==
Employer of Record (EOR) services are commonly used by organizations that need to hire employees in foreign markets or in regions where they lack a legal presence. This arrangement enables businesses to hire workers in different countries without having to establish a legal entity in each jurisdiction. EORs are also used for managing remote workforces, especially in industries where remote work is common.

The EOR assumes responsibility for compliance with local labor laws, which vary between countries and can involve significant regulatory complexity. By managing these legal obligations, the EOR mitigates the risks that companies face when hiring employees across borders.

== Comparison with Professional Employer Organization ==
EOR services are sometimes compared to those provided by a Professional employer organization (PEO). While both models involve outsourcing certain employment responsibilities, there are key differences between PEO and EOR services. In a PEO arrangement, the PEO and the client company share employment responsibilities through a co-employment model. The PEO typically manages payroll, benefits, and other human resources functions, while the client company directs the employees' daily work activities.

In contrast, an EOR acts as the sole legal employer of the workers, taking full responsibility for compliance with labor laws, tax filings, and the provision of benefits. The client company continues to manage the day-to-day work of the employees, but the EOR handles all administrative and legal obligations.

== Legal and compliance responsibilities ==
EORs take on the responsibility for ensuring that all employment practices comply with local regulations. This includes adherence to labor laws, tax obligations, and statutory benefits such as health insurance or retirement plans. The EOR also manages employment contracts and ensures that all legal requirements related to employee protections and workplace regulations are met.

Labor laws in many countries can be complex, with non-compliance potentially resulting in legal or financial penalties. An Employer of Record (EOR) assumes responsibility for compliance with these regulations, helping companies that may lack expertise in local labor laws or resources for managing these obligations.

== Industry usage ==
EOR services are used across a variety of industries, particularly in sectors where remote work or international expansion is common. For example, technology companies often use EOR services to hire developers or engineers in multiple countries without needing to set up separate entities in each region. Similarly, healthcare providers may use EORs to manage employment in regions with regulatory environments they lack knowledge of, while maintaining focus on their core operations.

Employer of Record (EOR) services have become more common with the growth of remote work and global workforce expansion. These services enable companies to hire employees in various countries while managing the associated legal and administrative requirements.

== History ==
The Employer of Record (EOR) model was introduced to allow businesses to manage employment in international markets without the need to establish a legal entity in each location. While it's been around for decades, there has been an explosion in the use of EORs in the wake of COVID and with the rise of remote, distributed teams. The increase in remote work and globalization has been associated with greater use of EOR services. According to the IEC Group's Global EOR Study 2026, the market is projected to reach US$16.7 billion by 2030, with Asia-Pacific identified as the fastest growing region.

== See also ==
- Agency worker law
- Alternative Employer Organization
- Business process outsourcing
- Contingent workforce
- Globalization
- Labor law
- Outsourcing
- Professional employer organization
