= Wise (company) =

Financial services company

Wise PLC
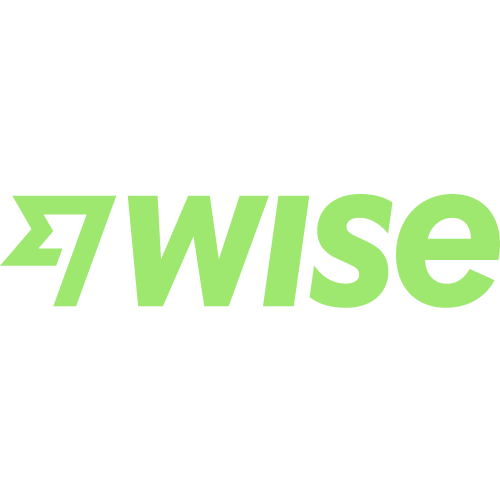
- Company type: Public company
- Traded as: Nasdaq: WSE; LSE: WISE
- Founded: January 2011; 15 years ago
- Headquarters: London, United Kingdom
- Country of origin: Estonia
- Area served: 160+ countries
- Founders: Taavet Hinrikus, Kristo Käärmann
- Chairperson: David Wells
- CEO: Kristo Käärmann
- Industry: Financial services
- Services: Foreign exchange, remittance
- Revenue: ▲£1.0 billion (2024)
- Operating income: ▲£262.3 million (2024)
- Net income: ▲£354.6 million (2024)
- Total assets: ▲£14.9 billion (2024)
- Total equity: ▲£979.9 million (2024)
- Employees: 5499 (2024)
- Website: wise.com

Wise, formerly known as TransferWise, is a British financial technology company focused on global money transfers and Business Finance. Headquartered in London, it was founded by Kristo Käärmann and Taavet Hinrikus in January 2011. As of 2023, it offers three main products: Wise Account, Wise Business, and Wise Platform.

== History ==
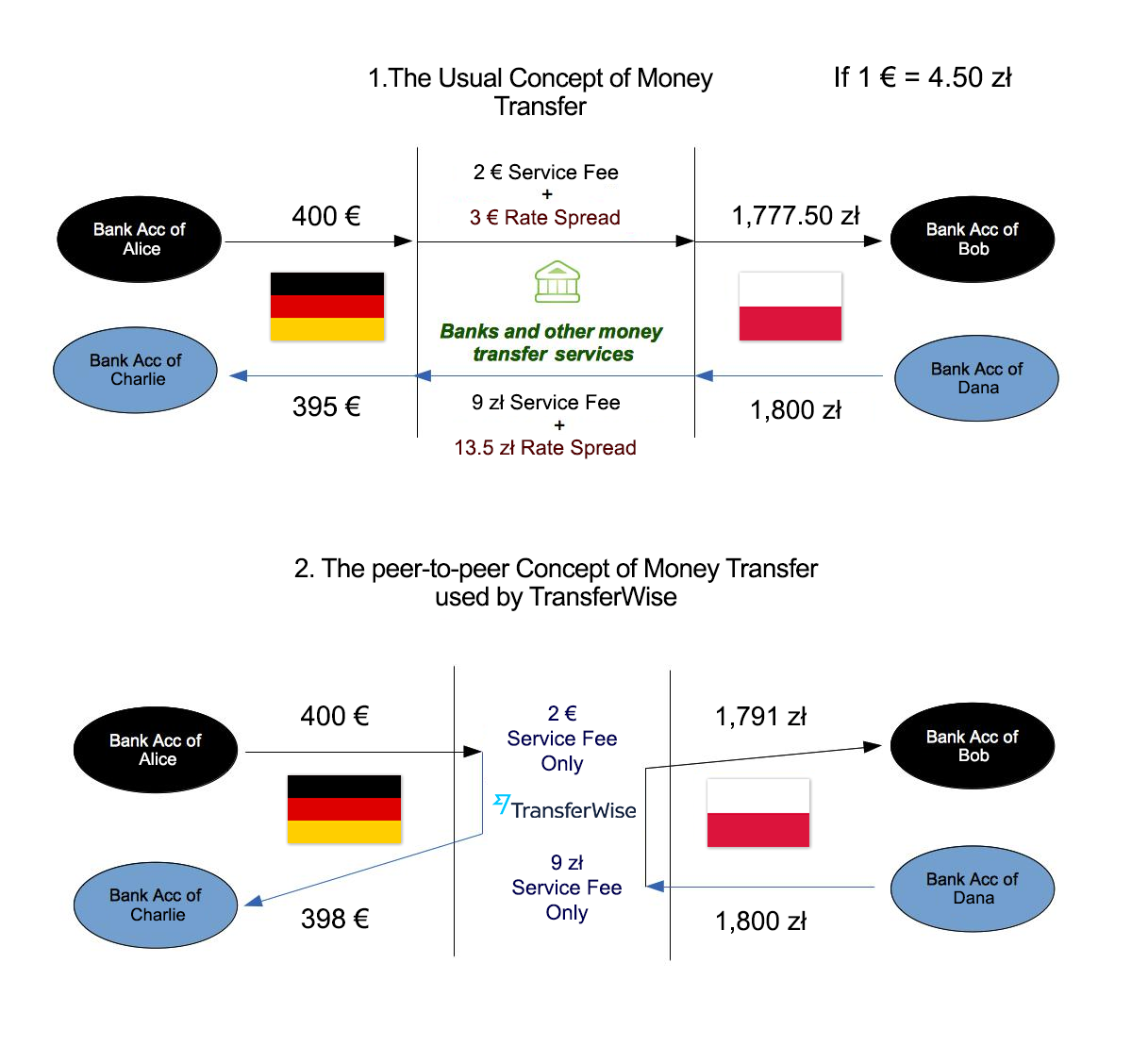
Regular money transfer versus peer-to-peer money transfer, as used by Wise

Wise was cofounded in London by Taavet Hinrikus, one of the first employees of Skype, and Kristo Käärmann, a Deloitte management consultant.

Hinrikus moved from Estonia to London around 2006, when he began experiencing the challenges of international money transfers. He became aware that when sending money between Estonia and the UK, banks would typically deduct at least a 5% fee, and also remarked that most of the charge is hidden in the exchange rate. According to him, banks try hard to make it extremely difficult to understand what the consumer is paying for, and there is no transparency in the market.

In its first year of operation, transactions through Wise amounted to €10 million. In 2012, Wise was named one of "East London's 20 hottest tech startups" by The Guardian, Start-Up of the Week by Wired UK, one of five "start-ups to watch" at Seedcamp's 2012 US Demo Day by TechCrunch, and appeared in Startups.co.uk's list of the top 100 UK start-ups of 2012.

In April 2013, Wise stopped letting users purchase Bitcoin, citing pressure from banking providers. Independent comparison site Monito reported that Wise was on average 83% cheaper than the big four UK banks on major currency "routes", but could be up to 90% cheaper in certain specific cases.

In May 2015, Wise was ranked No. 8 on CNBC's 2015 Disruptor 50 list, and in August 2015, the company was named a World Economic Forum Tech Pioneer.

On 8 April 2017, an internal memo from Santander UK claimed the bank would lose 84% of its revenue from its money transfer business if its charges were the same as Wise. Also in April 2017, the company announced the opening of its APAC hub in Singapore. In 2019, the company announced opening an office in Brussels. In May 2017, the company announced its customers were sending over £1 billion every month using the service, and that the company had turned profitable six years after being founded.

On 21 January 2021, Sky News reported that Wise had appointed Goldman Sachs and Morgan Stanley as joint global coordinators for its planned initial public offering. On 22 February 2021, the company rebranded from TransferWise to Wise. As part of this rebranding, the company also launched a new website domain. The company rebranded to reflect its expanded product offering beyond international money transfer.

On 2 July 2021, it was announced in a prospectus published by the company that co-founder Taavet Hinrikus would step down as chair within a year. It was also announced that David Wells would replace him in this position.

On 7 July 2021, Wise went public with a direct listing on the London Stock Exchange and was valued at $11 billion.

On 27 June 2022, the Financial Conduct Authority reported that the Wise CEO, Kristo Käärmann, was included on their list of individuals and businesses receiving penalties for a deliberate default regarding their tax affairs. He would remain on the list for 12 months, starting in September 2021. He reportedly failed to pay £720,000 for the 2017–2018 tax year.

In 2023, the founders, Käärmann and Hinrikus, have improved their positions in The Sunday Times Rich List 2023 of the wealthiest people in the UK. Käärmann, ranked as 156th, being worth £1.134 billion and Hinrikus ranked 197th with a net worth of £861 million.

In June 2024, the company announced that its customers may have been affected by a data breach at partner bank Evolve Bank & Trust.

In March 2025, Wise continued its expansion journey by opening new offices in London and Tallinn. A new office in Singapore opened in April 2025.

In June 2025, Wise announced that it planned to move its primary listing from London to the U.S. The transfer was completed in May 2026, when Wise began trading on Nasdaq while retaining a secondary listing on the London Stock Exchange.

In June 2026, The Bureau of Investigative Journalism reported that Wise platforms were suspected of being involved in around £432m worth of suspicious transactions spanning 30 European countries. Shortly after, Belgian prosecutors told French media that Wise was being investigated over suspicions that criminals were using its accounts for money laundering.

== Services ==
Old logo used until 2023

Wise offers three products: Wise Account, Wise Business, and Wise Platform. Wise is not a bank, as it states it does not lend out customer money to others.

- Wise Account allows customers to hold their money while sending, receiving, and spending. Customers may opt-in to earn interest on the account and gain FDIC insurance on up to $250,000 of their deposit, relying on Wise's partnership with banks.
- Wise Business allows businesses to perform cross-border money transfers.
- Wise Platform is a platform allowing "banks and businesses to offer their customers fast, cheap and transparent ways to manage their money across borders".

As of 2023, Wise partners with BlackRock for its interest bearing accounts.

== Funding ==
Wise received seed funding amounting to $1.3 million from a consortium including venture firms IA Ventures and Index Ventures, IJNR Ventures, NYPPE as well as individual investors such as PayPal co-founder Max Levchin, former Betfair CEO David Yu, and Wonga.com co-founder Errol Damelin. Wise also received investment after being named one of Seedcamp 2011's winners.

In May 2013, it was announced that Wise had secured a $6 million investment round led by Peter Thiel's Valar Ventures. Wise raised a further $25 million in June 2014, adding Richard Branson as an investor.

In January 2015, it was announced that Wise had raised a $58 million Series C round, led by investors Andreessen Horowitz. In May 2016, Wise secured a funding of $26 million. This raised the company's valuation to $1.1 billion. As of May 2016, Wise has raised a total of $117 million in funding.

In November 2017, the company raised a $280 million Series E led by Old Mutual Global Investors and Institutional Venture Partners, as well as Sapphire Ventures, Japanese Mitsui & Co., and World Innovation Lab.

In May 2019, the company had the secondary investment round of $292 million and reached the total valuation of $3.5 billion, more than double the valuation Wise achieved in late 2017 at the time of its $280 million Series E round.

In July 2020, the company disclosed a secondary investment round of $319 million and reached the total valuation of $5 billion, led by new investor D1 Capital Partners and existing shareholder Lone Pine Capital. Vulcan Capital also came on board as a new investor, with Baillie Gifford, Fidelity Investments and LocalGlobe adding to their existing holdings.

== Criticism ==
In May 2016, Wise's claim "you save up to 90% against banks" was called misleading by the UK Advertising Standards Authority (ASA). The ASA determined that the currency conversion calculator on Wise's website provided misleading calculations.

In June 2020, after experts raised ethical and privacy concerns around the digital COVID-19 immunity passports Wise was helping develop, the company conceded immunity passports were not a "perfect solution" and co-founder Hinrikus said they would not be launched publicly until there was scientific consensus on COVID-19 immunity.

In January 2023, Wise was accused of harming competition in an official letter to the UK Competition and Markets Authority by its competitor Atlantic Money. Wise is said to have removed the cheaper challenger from its international transfers price comparison table for economic reasons. Wise is also alleged to have denied Atlantic Money access to additional comparison sites the firm owns and controls.

In February 2025, Wise was ordered to pay nearly $2.5 million over alleged “illegal remittance practices,” including advertising inaccurate fees and failing to properly disclose exchange rates by the Consumer Financial Protection Bureau (CFPB) in the US.
