= Atlantic Money =

Fixed fee money transfer provider

Atlantic Money Inc.
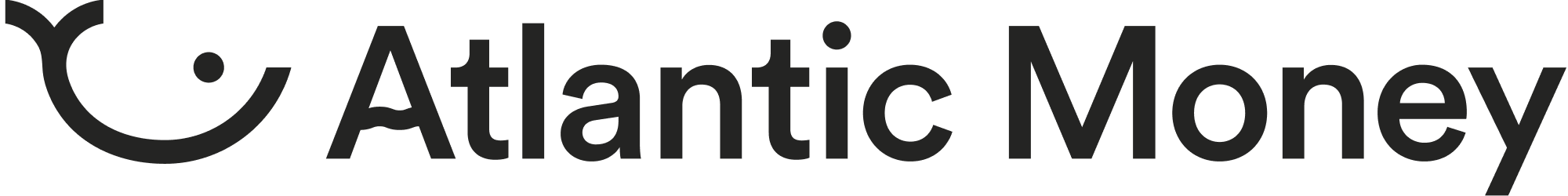
- Industry: Financial services
- Founded: December 2020; 5 years ago
- Founder: Neeraj Baid; Patrick Kavanagh
- Headquarters: London, England, UK
- Key people: Neeraj Baid (CEO)
- Services: Money transfers, Remittance
- Website: atlantic.money

Atlantic Money is a London-headquartered financial technology company that offers international money transfers for a fixed fee. The firm was founded in 2020 and officially launched in 2022 by two Americans, Neeraj Baid and Patrick Kavanagh, both early employees of the listed US financial services company Robinhood.

== Funding ==
Atlantic Money received seed funding of $7.5M over two phases in 2022 from venture capital firms including Kleiner Perkins, Wise-backer Index Ventures, Coinbase-backer Ribbit, Amplo, Harry Stebbings’ 20VC, Nordstar, Elefund, Susa Ventures, Webull founder Anquan Wang and Robinhood founders Vladimir Tenev and Baiju Bhatt.

== Business model ==
Atlantic Money operates on a fixed-fee model for international money transfers, which differs from the percentage-based fees often used by competitors. The company charges a flat fee of £3 or €3 for transfers up to £1 million or €1 million, respectively.

== Activities ==
=== Published applications ===
Atlantic Money has released mobile apps for both iOS and Android devices. The iOS app was launched first in the United Kingdom on 21 July 2022. On 9 February 2023, the Android app followed. Atlantic Money launched a web version of its app in May 2024 after hitting £400M+ in total volume. On 02 October 2024 the company launched a low-cost alternative to SWIFT called “Portals” allowing its users to send money from their personal bank on the Atlantic Money transfer network without needing its app. Atlantic Money can be used by residents of the United Kingdom and 30 European countries to send euros or pounds sterling into 10 different foreign currencies.

=== Complaints about Wise ===
In January 2023, Atlantic Money suspected its competitor Wise of harming competition in an official letter to the UK Competition and Markets Authority (CMA). Wise is said to have removed the cheaper challenger from its international money transfers price comparison table for economic reasons. Atlantic Money also charged Wise with denying access to other price comparison sites that the company owns and controls. In March 2023, Atlantic Money approached the European Commission with its concerns about Wise's conduct.
