= Rippling (company) =

Software company

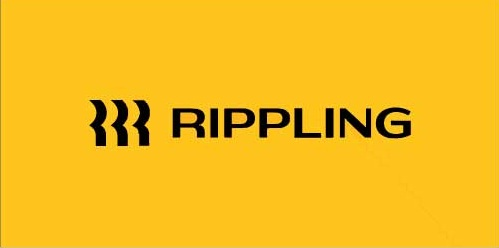
- Type: Private
- Industry: Human resource management
- Founded: 2017 in San Francisco
- Founder: Prasanna Sankar, Parker Conrad
- Headquarters: San Francisco, California, United States
- Area served: International
- Key people: Parker Conrad (CEO)
- Products: Human resources platform, payroll services
- Total equity: $16.8 billion (2025)
- Number of employees: 5,000 (2025)

Rippling is a privately owned international software company. Launched in 2017 in San Francisco, California, it operates a cloud-based software platform that allows businesses to manage their HR, finances, and IT matters, and also has AI features to automate administrative tasks and provide data and analysis.

== History ==
Parker Conrad and Prasanna Sankar co-founded Rippling in 2016 in San Francisco. The company creates software for companies to handle HR and onboarding, as well as payroll and other management matters. It charges customers a monthly fee for access to its software platform. Rippling released a function to help file for Paycheck Protection Program (PPP) loans in April 2020.

In 2023, as Rippling relied on Silicon Valley Bank to process its customers' employee paychecks, it was impacted when the bank suddenly collapsed and withdrawals were frozen. With a funding round facilitated by Greenoaks Capital, Rippling brought in almost $500 million to cover payments during that period. Afterwards, Rippling moved its banking from SVB to JPMorgan.

=== Recent developments (2024-2026) ===
In 2024, Rippling was valued at $13.5 billion. While it remained unprofitable, it had $1 billion in cash on hand for expansion and development. Rippling had 2,800 employees as of 2024, and offices in California, Ireland, the UK, India, and Australia. In March 2025, Rippling sued its competitor Deel in Ireland, alleging corporate espionage. Shortly afterwards, Deel counter-sued in Delaware with an anti-SLAPP motion. In April 2025, the alleged Deel spy admitted to espionage in what Fortune called "a major scandal rocking the HR world." A judge dismissed Deel's attempt to have Rippling's lawsuit thrown out in 2026, allowing the case to proceed.

In May 2025, Rippling raised $450 million in a Series G funding round, valuing the company at $16.8 billion, up from $13.5 billion the prior year. New investors included Sands Capital, GIC, Goldman Sachs Growth, and Baillie Gifford, bringing total funding raised to $1.85 billion.

Having already launched Rippling AI, which integrates AI features into its other software, in June 2026, Rippling launched Rippling Data Cloud, a business intelligence product. Rippling Data Cloud lets companies connect their own organizational data with imported third-party business data. In July 2026, Rippling's annual revenue was around $1 billion.
