= Alternate Employer Organization =

Type of human resources firm in the state of Ohio

An alternate employer organization (AEO) is any human resource service firm in the state of Ohio that targets small and medium-sized business (typically less than 250 employees). Offerings include payroll processing, payroll tax filing, workers’ compensation insurance, health benefits, employers’ practice and liability insurance, and workforce management technology, training and development.

== Background ==
Similar to employee leasing companies, PEOs emerged in the 1980s to provied HR services beyond staffing. PEOs proposed to perform an array of administrative tasks for businesses and to ensure regulatory compliance.

PEOs become the employer of record for tax purposes—filing paperwork (payroll, taxes, insurance, etc.) under its tax identification number(s). As the employer, the PEO is responsible for withholding taxes, paying unemployment insurance taxes and providing workers’ compensation coverage. The relationship allows the client-employer to focus on the business and its employees’ activities.

PEOs are regulated at the state level. The PEO model is utilized by many businesses, though some grapple with transparency-related obstacles with respect to federal payroll tax obligations. Because the PEO (through its own Employer Identification Number) serves as the responsible party for reporting to the Federal Internal Revenue Service, only the PEO receives notice regarding any tax payment discrepancies. Recognizing this dynamic, some client-employers have advocated for increased transparency and have voiced a preference to be included in any IRS-related communications.

== Ohio ==
Ohio lawmakers established the Alternate Employer Organization ("AEO") model, which is almost identical to a PEO, but allows client-employers to interface directly with the IRS by including their own tax identification number in relevant IRS filings (rather than the tax identification number of the PEO).

Developed by Cleveland-based company (and former PEO) Minute Men Select, an AEO entity operates much like a PEO, except that it files client-employer payroll taxes under the tax identification number (EIN) of the client-employer business, rather than the PEO. Entities choosing this option are licensed by the Ohio Bureau of Workers’ Compensation, but are identified as Alternate Employer Organizations under state law. Like PEOs, the AEO entity remains liable for payment of taxes and wages and may self-insure for purposes. The difference from PEO is that the AEO must file payroll taxes under the client-employer’s Federal EIN (thereby allowing the client-employer to receive IRS tax-related communications).
