= Dana Lixenberg =

Dutch photographer and filmmaker (born 1964)

Dana Lixenberg (born 1964) is a Dutch photographer and filmmaker. She lives and works in New York and Amsterdam. Lixenberg pursues long-term projects on individuals and communities on the margins of society. Her books include Jeffersonville, Indiana (2005), The Last Days of Shishmaref (2008), Set Amsterdam (2011), De Burgemeester/The Mayor (2011), and Imperial Courts (2015).

In 2017 Lixenberg won the Deutsche Börse Photography Prize for her publication Imperial Courts (Roma, 2015). In 2021 she was awarded an Honorary Fellowship of the Royal Photographic Society.

== Life and work ==
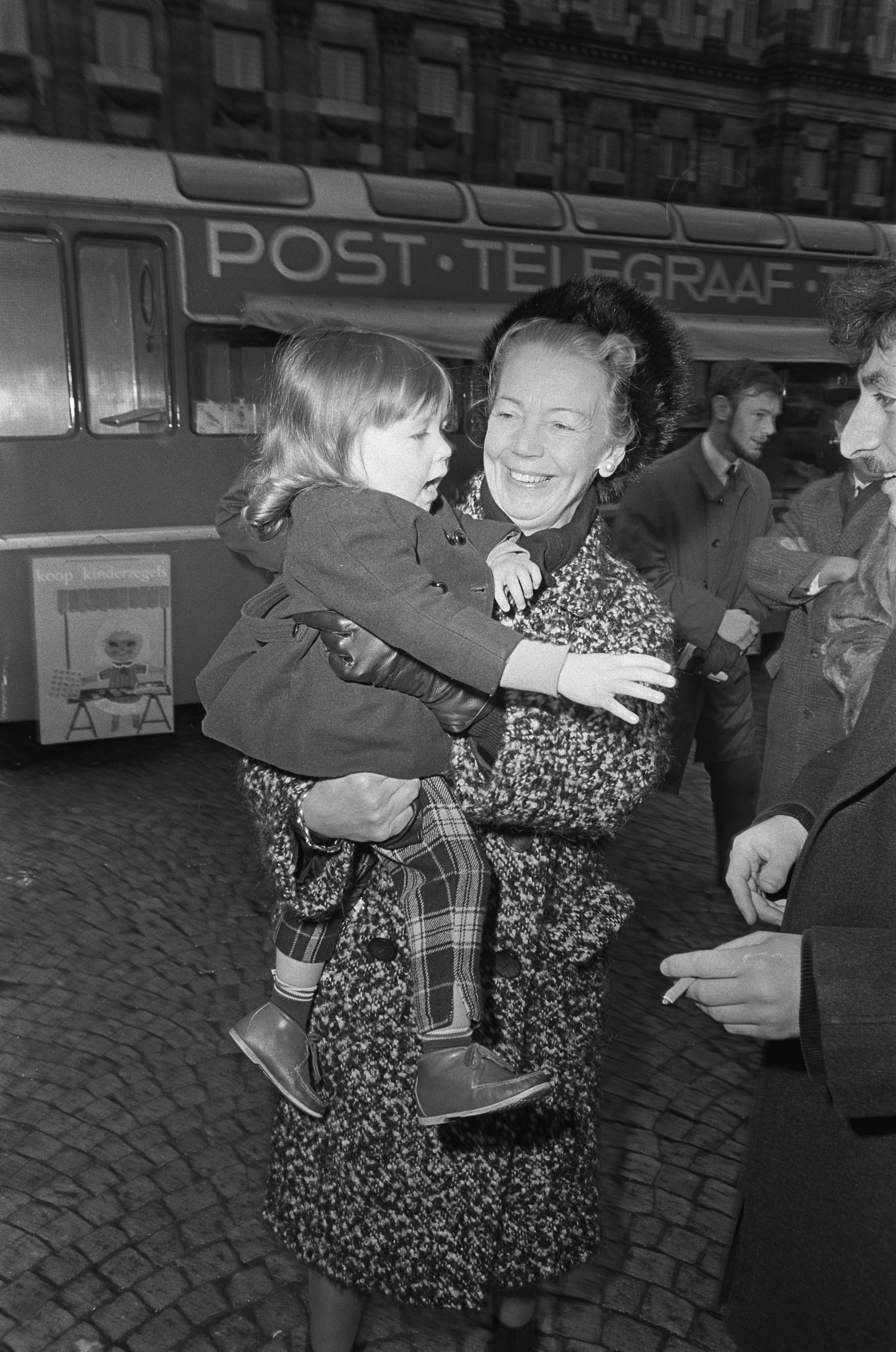
Dana Lixenberg (3 years old) and Emma Nijhoff during the presentation of Dutch children's stamps in 1966

Lixenberg studied photography at the London College of Printing (1984–1986) and at the Gerrit Rietveld Academy in Amsterdam (1987–1989). She has had work published in Newsweek, Vibe, New York Times Magazine, The New Yorker and Rolling Stone.

Lixenberg pursues long-term projects with a primary focus on individuals and communities on the margins of society, such as Jeffersonville, Indiana, a collection of landscapes and portraits of the small town's homeless population photographed over a seven-year period, and The Last Days of Shishmaref, which portrays an Inupiaq community on an eroding island of the coast of Alaska.

She photographed Prince and Whitney Houston. All her work is made with a large format camera.

Decisive in her career was the first series of photos she made in 1993 of Imperial Courts, a public housing project in Watts, Los Angeles. Lixenberg portrayed residents as distinctive and charismatic personalities, without direct references to their gang. The exhibition Imperial Courts, 1993-2015 at Huis Marseille in Amsterdam (2015) was the first comprehensive presentation of the Imperial Courts series, spanning a period of twenty-two years. As well as her photographs, the exhibition included a three channel video projection, an audio installation, and her book of the same name.

== Publications ==
- Imperial Courts, 1993-2015. Amsterdam: Roma, 2015. ISBN 9789491843426. With texts by Kenneth Cox, Lixenberg, and Carla Williams.

== Awards ==
- 2017: Deutsche Börse Photography Prize for Imperial Courts (2015)
- 2021: Honorary Fellowship of the Royal Photographic Society, Bristol
