= Jeeran =

Jeeran جيران
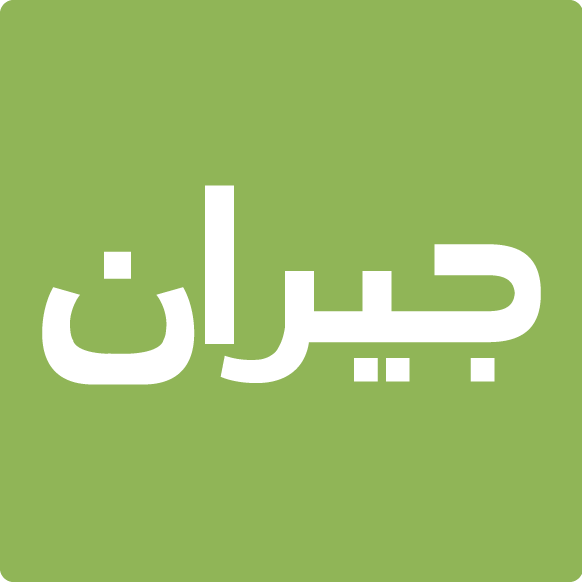
- Company type: Privately held company
- Available in: Arabic, English
- Founded: 2000; 26 years ago
- Headquarters: Amman, Jordan
- Area served: Arab World
- Key people: Omar Koudsi, Co-founder, Laith Zraikat, Co-founder
- Industry: Internet services
- Products: Website; Mobile App
- Employees: 15
- Website: jo.jeeran.com/ar/amman
- Registration: Not required
- Users: 2,000,000
- Launched: 2000; 26 years ago
- Current status: Active

Jeeran (Arabic: جيران,, lit. 'Neighbours') is a review site to help locals and visitors find the best restaurants, closest ATM, or a mechanic. Jeeran offers reviews, photos, phone numbers, and maps for over 350,000 places in Jordan, KSA, Egypt, and Kuwait.

== History ==
Jeeran was founded in 2000 as a free hosting platform, in 2005 it evolved to offer blogging services aimed at bringing more Arabic content online. 2010 witnessed Jeeran's biggest transformation to a reviews' platform for the Arab world.

Following this big transformation, Jeeran released an iPhone app late 2011 and an Android app early 2012. In 2014 Jeeran apps went under major revamp with the launch of Jeeran on Windows phones.

== Logo history ==
Starting as a free hosting platform in 2000, three houses were used, representing the individuals as neighbours (Jeeran in Arabic). A refined version of this logo was used in 2006 when Jeeran switched to a blogging platform, as the houses remained a valid representation of users.

In 2010, Jeeran has transformed to become “Places in your City” and the ultimate guide for locals and visitors alike. The three houses were reduced to one, and the logo had the slogan added to it to emphasize this transformation.

Jeeran has expanded to exist on every mobile platform and in more than 38 Cities in 4 countries.

It launched a redesigned logo to symbolize the spirit of Jeeran as a company and the team's passion for growth and progress.

== Main features ==
Jeeran site and mobile apps cover the following features:

1. Listing of all places in cities it covers.
2. Details including phone numbers, photos, maps, user generated reviews and ratings about those places
3. The ability to bookmark places, write reviews or add photos
4. Questions and Answers section: where people can ask questions about specific services or products in the city

== Reception and usage ==
The Jeeran app hit 375,000 downloads in February 2015 and is rated 4.5 on iTunes, and 4.3 on Google Play Store.
