= Jeff Cowen =

American art photographer

- Born: January 9, 1966 (age 60); New York City, New York, U.S.
- Education: New York University
- Occupation: Art photographer

Jeff Cowen (January 9, 1966 in New York City, New York) is an American art photographer. He is known for painterly silver gelatin photo murals and photo collages. Various chemical procedures, mark-making, brushwork, and post darkroom mixed media finishing techniques are often contained in his artworks.

== Early life and education ==
Jeff Cowen was a New York University Honours Scholar in East Asian Studies. He also studied at Waseda University in Tokyo. His senior year he took a photography class with Elaine Mayes at the Tisch School of the Arts at NYU. During this class he made photographs of prostitution in the Meatpacking District in New York City. This work was acquired by the New-York Historical Society for their permanent collection.

== Career ==
After graduating he worked as an assistant for master American photographers Larry Clark from 1988 to 1990, and Ralph Gibson from 1990 to 1992. Clark was the assistant of W. Eugene Smith and Gibson was the assistant of Dorothea Lange.

At age 23, Cowen's images of the Romanian Revolution appeared in: The Guardian, Tel Aviv Post, Yomiuri Shimbun, Asahi Shimbun.

Cowen studied drawing and anatomy (1994–1996) at the Art Students League of New York and the New York Studio School.

In 2001, he moved to Paris, France. In 2005, his first monograph was published by Paris Musées. That monograph contains his early New York work and his painterly Mural collages of nudes. In 2007, Cowen collaborated with filmmaker and writer Andre Labarthe founder of the Cahiers du cinéma for his exhibition called The Lotus Eaters.

In 2007, Cowen located his studio in the Kreuzberg district of Berlin for 16 years, before he returned to New York City in 2023. From 2025, Jeff Cowen lives and works in France.

He was awarded the Thomas Cooke Award for Photography. In 2021, Jeff Cowen was nominated and awarded the Pollock Krasner Grant for Fine Art Still Photography.

Jeff Cowen's works are included in numerous private and public collections, including Huis Marseille, Museum for Photography, Amsterdam, Netherlands; Los Angeles County Museum of Art (LACMA), United States; DZ Bank Art Collection Frankfurt, Germany, among others. In 2024, his project "Provence Works" is presented in a joint exhibition by the Huis Marseille Museum for Photography and the Van Gogh Museum in Amsterdam. His works have been shown in Fotografiska Museum, Stockholm, Sweden; Kunsthalle Bremerhaven, Germany; Ludwig Museum, Koblenz, Germany; Huis Marseille, Museum voor Fotografie, Amsterdam, Netherland; Moscow Museum of Modern Art, Russia; among others.

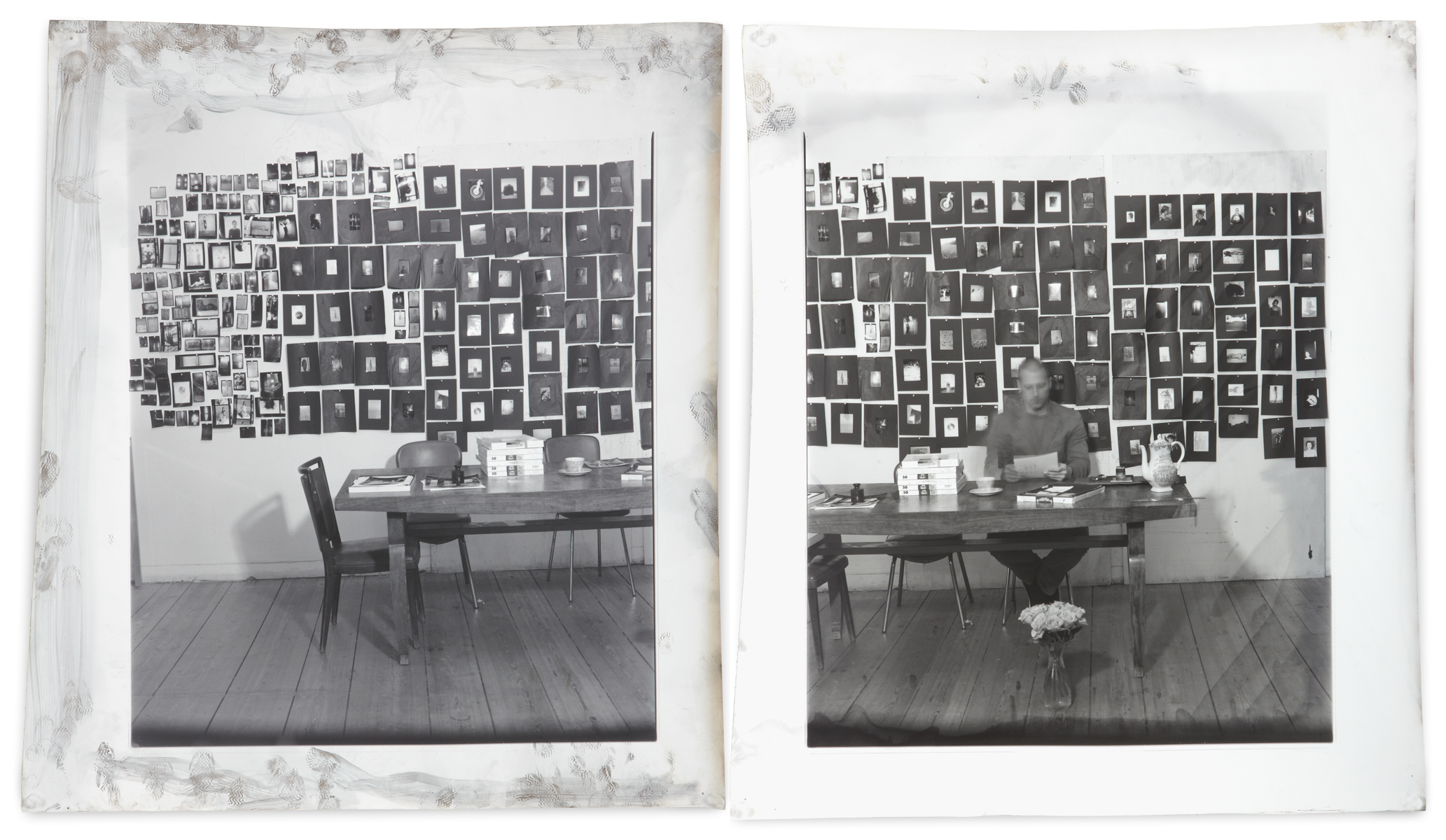
Self-portrait by Jeff Cowen and Csilla Szabo (diptych), 55 x 98 cm, 2011, Edition of 6

== Personal life ==
Cowen taught photography to underprivileged, inner-city kids at LEAP between 1990 and 1994. Cowen discovered and mentored the young and brilliant illegal immigrant Dan-el Padilla and helped him earn a scholarship to Collegiate School in New York City. Padilla later earned a scholarship at Princeton University where he graduated with the highest distinction and was offered full scholarship at Oxford University. Due to Padilla's illegal immigrant status, Padilla and Cowen were both featured in an article in the Wall Street Journal that highlighted some of the absurdity and rigidity of U.S. immigration laws. Dan-el Padilla is currently an associate professor of classics at Princeton University.

== Selected exhibitions ==
- 2026:En plein air, CASSIUS&Co. in partnership with Sotheran’s, London, UK (solo exhibition)
- 2025:Jeff Cowen: Provence Works, Paris Photo, Grand Palais, Paris, France (solo exhibition)
- 2024: Provence Works, Huis Marseille – Museum voor Fotografie, and Van Gogh Museum, Amsterdam (solo exhibition)
- 2024: Berlin Works, Fotografiska Stockholm (solo exhibition)
- 2024: Seance: Jeff Cowen’s Work in Dialogue with Hans Bellmer, Joseph Beuys, Claude Cahun, Sigmar Polke, and others. HOUSE, Berlin
- 2024: Jeff Cowen, Werner Knaupp, fotodiskurs, Augsburg
- 2023: Women’s Work, New York Historical Society Museum, New York (group exhibition)
- 2021: Jeff Cowen. Moscow Museum of Modern Art, Moscow (solo exhibition)
- 2020: The Lives and Loves of Images. Wilhelm-Hack Museum, Ludwigshafen (group exhibition)
- 2019: 64 Art Works. Art Collection of The New School, New York (group exhibition)
- 2019: Jeff Cowen. Galerie Wilma Tolksdorf, Frankfurt (solo exhibition)
- 2019: Jeff Cowen 30 Works. curated by Eric Schlosser, Museum of Modern Art, Tbilisi (solo exhibition)
- 2018: Recent Work. Michael Werner Kunsthandel, Köln (solo exhibition)
- 2018: Picture Believer. The Glen Bjørnholt Collection, Oslo (group exhibition)
- 2018: Elèctric i llunyà. Collection olorVisual, Barcelona (group exhibition)
- 2017: Jeff Cowen Photoworks 2002 – 2015. Huis Marseille, Museum voor Fotografie, Amsterdam (solo exhibition)
- 2016: Jeff Cowen Photoworks 2002 – 2015. Ludwig Museum, Koblenz (solo exhibition)
- 2016: Jeff Cowen Sculpture Photographs. Michael Werner Kunsthandel, Köln (solo exhibition)
- 2016: Jeff Cowen Capturing Eclipse. Galerie Wilma Tolksdorf, Frankfurt (solo exhibition)
- 2016: Back To The Future Of Photography. DZ Art Collection, Frankfurt (group exhibition)
- 2016: Fotografies I Dibuixos. Gallery A34, Barcelona (group exhibition)
- 2015: Jeff Cowen Capturing Eclipse. Kunsthalle Bremerhaven, Bremerhaven (solo exhibition)
- 2015: Jeff Cowen. Willas Contemporary, Oslo (solo exhibition)
- 2015: Marguerite. Galerie Seine 51, Paris (group exhibition)
- 2014: Jeff Cowen, Yamamoto Masao, Arno Rafael Minkkinen. Blomqvist Kunsthandel, Oslo (group exhibition)
- 2014: Hängengeblieben – 25 Jahre Kunstverein Recklinghausen. Kunsthalle Recklinghausen (group exhibition)
- 2014: The Marseillaise / fifteen years of collecting. Huis Marseille – Museum voor Fotografie, Amsterdam (group exhibition)
- 2014: Landscapes. Kunstverein Recklinghausen, Recklinghausen (solo exhibition)
- 2014: Jeff Cowen. VeneKlasen/Werner, Berlin (solo exhibition)
- 2014: PHOTOGRAPHY. Michael Werner Kunsthandel, Köln (solo exhibition)
- 2014: Jeff Cowen. Paris Photo 2013, Michael Werner Kunsthandel, Grand Palais, Paris (solo exhibition)
- 2014: Jeff Cowen and Yamamoto Masao. Pug Gallery, Norwegen (group exhibition)
- 2012: The Cross. Nuova Galleria Morone, Mailand (group exhibition)
- 2012: Jeff Cowen. Photographic works. Michael Werner Kunsthandel, Köln (solo exhibition)
- 2011: Jeff Cowen. Gallery Seine 51, Paris (solo exhibition)
- 2011: Insight. Art Moscow special project, Moskau (solo exhibition)
- 2011: Jeff Cowen. Urs Albrecht, Basel (solo exhibition)
- 2010: Scarab. Bernd Klüser, München (solo exhibition)
- 2009: Jeff Cowen. Galerie Seine 51 Paris et Galerie Seine 51 Miami (solo exhibition)
- 2008: Jeff Cowen. Galerie A34, Barcelona (solo exhibition)
- 2008: White. Galerie Seine 51, Paris (group exhibition)
- 2008: Photo murals. Galerie Bernd Klüser, München (solo exhibition)
- 2006: The Lotus-Eaters. Galerie Seine 51, Paris (solo exhibition)
- 2006: Fotografies. A/34 Gallery, Barcelona (group exhibition)
- 2006: Premières rencontres photographiques. Galerie d’Art de Créteil, Créteil (solo exhibition)
- 2005: L’art et la guerre. La Filature, Mulhouse (solo exhibition)
- 2004: 1987-2004 work. Galerie Seine 51, Paris (solo exhibition)
- 2003: Shoot and Die. Galerie Seine 51, Paris (solo exhibition)
- 2001: The Scroll Paintings. The Point Gallery, New York (solo exhibition)
- 2001: Ming Murals. Chaos Night Club, New York (solo exhibition)
- 2000: China Studies, Luise Gallery, New York (solo exhibition)
- 1999: Shoot and Die. Vitrinen Calvin Klein, Bergdorf Goodman, New York (solo exhibition)
- 1994: South Bronx, Collegiate School, New York
- 1993: Jeff Cowen. West 14th Street at The Space, New York, curated by Chris D’Amelio (solo exhibition)
