= Professional employer organization =

Type of outsourcing company

A professional employer organisation (PEO) is an outsourcing firm that provides services to small and medium-sized businesses. Typically, the PEO offering may include human resource consulting, safety and risk mitigation services, payroll processing, employer payroll tax filing, workers' compensation insurance, health benefits, employers' practice and liability insurance, retirement vehicles (401(k)), regulatory compliance assistance, workforce management technology, and training and development. The PEO enters into a contractual co-employment agreement with its clientele. Through co-employment, the PEO becomes the employer of record for tax purposes, filing payroll taxes under its own tax identification numbers. As the legal employer, the PEO is responsible for withholding proper taxes, paying unemployment insurance taxes and providing workers' compensation coverage.

As of 2017, industry gross revenues in the United States were estimated to be over US$174 billion annually. In 2017, there were 907 PEOs operating in the United States alone, servicing 3.7 million workers, which were spread across approximately 175,000 clients.

== Business model ==
In co-employment, the PEO becomes the employer of record for tax purposes, filing paperwork under its own tax identification numbers. The client company continues to direct the employees' day-to-day activities. PEOs charge a service fee for taking over the human resources and payroll functions of the client company: typically, this is from 3 to 15% of total gross payroll. This fee is in addition to the normal employee overhead costs, such as the employer's share of FICA, Medicare, and unemployment insurance withholding. This service fee is most commonly referred to as an "administration fee."

One service provided by a PEO is to secure workers' compensation insurance coverage at a lower cost than client companies can obtain on an individual basis. Essentially, a PEO obtains workers' compensation coverage for its clients by negotiating insurance coverage that covers not just the PEO, but also the client companies. This is allowed because, legally, the PEO is the employer of the workers at the client companies. PEOs can also offer basic levels of background & drug screening.

A PEO is not a staffing agency or human resources outsourcing company. A PEO works on behalf of small and mid-sized businesses to manage HR management, employee benefits, compliance, payroll, retirement planning, and more. The client company may also be able to offer a better overall package of benefits, and thus attract more skilled employees. The PEO model is attractive to small and mid-sized businesses and associations, and PEO marketing is typically directed toward this segment.

Several variations on the PEO model exist, differing in the nature of the relationship formed between PEO and client company.

- Administrative services organizations (ASO) are similar to PEOs, but do not create a co-employment relationship. Employees remain solely under the control of the client company. Tax and insurance filings are done by the ASO, but under the client company's Employer Identification Number.
- Umbrella companies, found primarily in the UK, act as employer of record for independent contractors instead of permanent employees. The contractors become employees of the umbrella company, but do not also become employees of the client. The growth in umbrella companies in the UK is attributed to legislation targeting "disguised income" by contractors performing the same duties as employees but hired via intermediaries. The press release announcing the legislation, IR35, is often used to refer to the legislation itself.
- Pass-through agencies are staffing firms that act as the employer of record for independent contractors, but do not obtain work for them. Like umbrella companies in the UK, the contractors do not become employees of the client.
- Global and international PEO services are now being offered by third-party HR intermediaries acting as an employer of record to assist companies that hire globally in navigating rules and regulations in various countries where they want to hire. Companies that provide such services are able to do so in over 185 countries.
- Financial intermediaries, also called fiscal intermediaries, act as an employer of record for home healthcare workers who serve disabled persons. This streamlines the process of hiring such workers, because neither the household hiring them nor government units that provide funding need to take on the duties of an employer. They are part of the self-determination movement in disability care.

== Early history ==
Employee leasing in the United States began in the late 1960s by three businessmen, Eugene Boffa, Louis Calmare, and Joseph Martinez. The concept was popularized by Marvin R. Selter, who leased the employees of a doctor's office in Southern California. The Employee Retirement Income Security Act of 1974 (ERISA) contained an exemption for multiple employer welfare arrangements (MEWA), which provided a loophole for employers with leased employees to claim they were exempt from the ERISA requirements. Passage of the Tax Equity and Fiscal Responsibility Act of 1982 (TEFRA) further encouraged employee leasing by providing a tax shelter for employers who contributed a minimum amount to employee plans. More stringent guidelines in the Tax Reform Act of 1986 later eliminated most of the TEFRA incentive, however.

By 1985, there were approximately 275 staff leasing companies in the United States.

== Abuses ==
State Unemployment Tax (SUTA) arbitrage, commonly referred to as "SUTA dumping," occurs when an employer with a high unemployment insurance rate transfers or "dumps" employees to purchased subsidiaries with lower unemployment insurance rates. In a PEO relationship, the client company takes the PEO's SUTA rate, which often lowers their SUTA through SUTA Arbitrage. The only time this would not apply is in client reporting states.

Like any employer, PEOs are in a position to commit fraud by keeping the funds deducted from employee paychecks instead of paying the insurance and government entities for whom the deductions were made. In a case in San Antonio, Texas four executives were convicted of siphoning $133 million from the three PEOs they owned and operated.

== Certified professional employer organizations ==
In 2014, the United States Congress enacted sections 3511 and 7705 of the Internal Revenue Code, provisions that include special definitions and rules related to the Federal tax treatment of a "certified professional employer organization."

== Regulation ==
Each state in the U.S. has differing regulations for workers' compensation insurance and state unemployment insurance, so PEOs are typically regulated at the state level.

In 2004, President George W. Bush signed into law the SUTA Dumping Prevention Act of 2004, which requires that all 50 states enact anti-SUTA-dumping legislation by 2007. Most states have now done so; however, federal law does not prohibit companies from using a PEO to obtain more favorable SUTA rates.

The staff leasing industry itself has also taken steps to address abuses. It formed its first trade association, the National Staff Leasing Association, in 1985. The association changed its name to the National Association of Professional Employer Organizations in 1994 to reflect the term in current usage.

As part of the industry's self-regulation efforts, an independent accreditation body, the Employer Services Assurance Corporation (ESAC), was formed in 1995. ESAC verifies accredited PEOs' compliance with important ethical, financial, and operational standards and provides financial assurance of the performance of key employer obligations by these PEOs. This financial assurance is backed by over $15 million in surety bonds and assures PEO clients, employees, insurers and government authorities that accredited PEOs are meeting their contractual and fiduciary responsibilities.

== Updated changes ==
In 1985, there were approximately 275 staff leasing companies in operation. In 2012, according to National Association of Professional Employer Organizations (NAPEO), there are now approximately 700 PEOs operating in all 50 states. They were responsible for approximately $81 billion in gross revenue in 2010.

== NCCI impact on PEOs ==
A change in 2013 regarding the way companies Experience Modifier is calculated has caused companies with previously good modifiers to get better, while companies whose modifiers had struggled previously have gotten worse. The Experience Rating Plan, as the National Council on Compensation Insurance (NCCI) refers to it, will be undergoing a change that NCCI believes will more accurately reflect individual employers’ claims experience. NCCI, the National Council on Compensation Insurance, sees this as a "Mod Neutral" action since the median average does not change. While some companies get better, some get worse. Overall, however, the "center" stays in essentially the same spot. While this will assist the good companies to improve their position, this will cause the companies in dire straits to get worse. Many of these companies may be forced out of the "standard" market and into secondary markets such as PEOs and other "options of last resort" such as state pools. This may lead to a further increase in the number of PEOs, or it may lead to an increase in state pools, or possibly both.

NCCI views this action as having two primary benefits. The first is that it "tailors the cost prediction and final net premium cost to the individual insured" making the calculation more accurate. The second benefit is that "it provides added incentives for loss reduction."

== See also ==
- Agency worker law
- Business Process Outsourcing
- Contingent workforce
- Manpower Inc.
- Alternative Employer Organization
