= Jainism in Uttar Pradesh =

Overview of Jainism in the Indian state of Uttar Pradesh

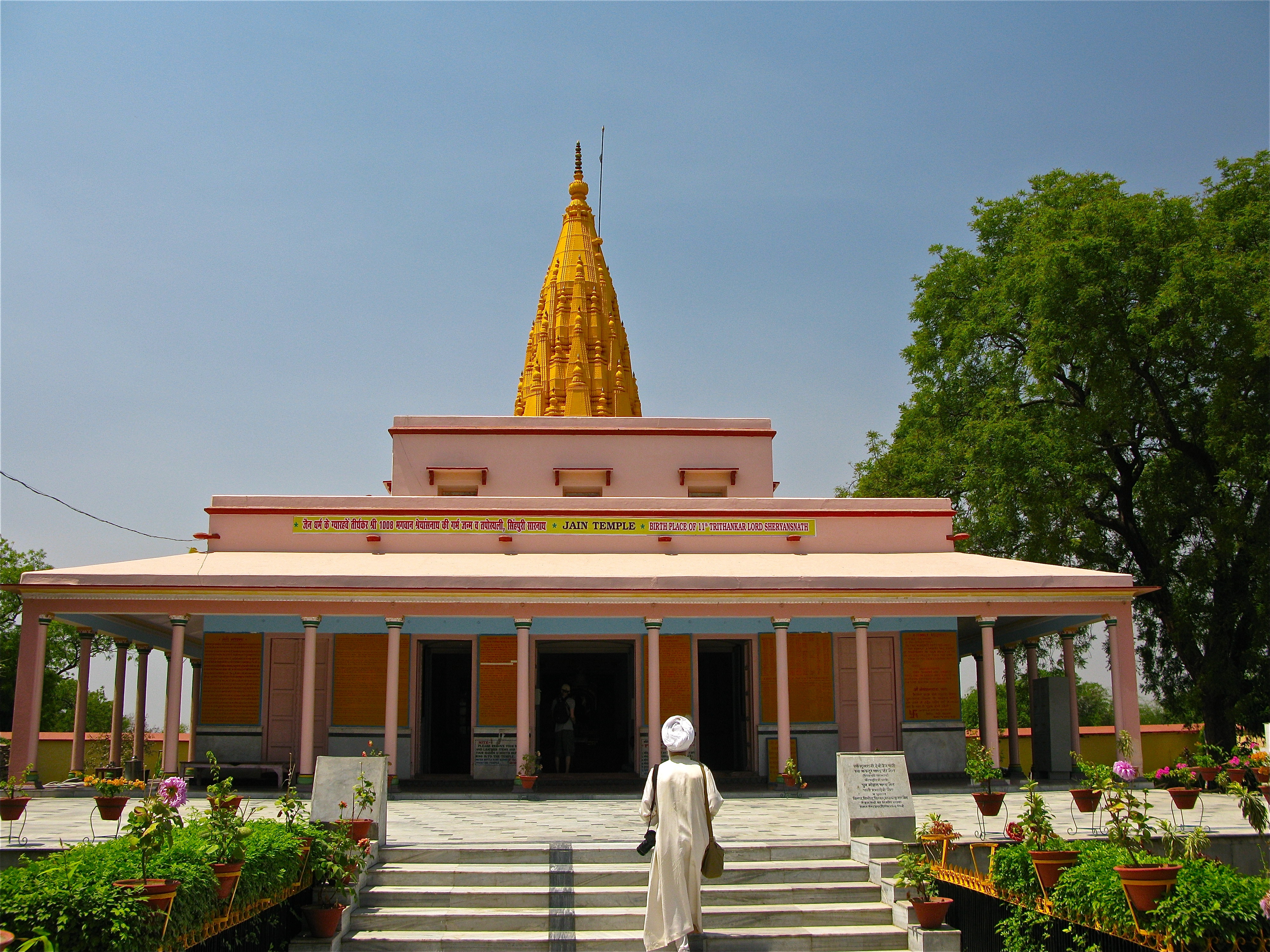
Sarnath Jain Tirth, the birthplace of Shreyanasanatha.

Uttar Pradesh, a state in north India has a long association with Jainism. Today the state is home to a number of Jain monuments, such as Jain Temples and Jain Tirths. There are around 213,267 Jains in Uttar Pradesh according to the 2011 Census of India.

== History ==
Parshvanatha, the twenty-third tirthankara, was born in Benaras (now Varanasi) in 872 BCE. According to Jain tradition, Kashi (now Varanasi) is the birthplace of three more tithankaras, namely Suparshvanatha, Chandraprabha and Shreyansanatha.

According to Jain tradition, five tirthankaras were born at Ayodhya, including Rishabhanatha, Ajitanatha, Abhinandananatha, Sumatinatha and Anantanatha.

The famous naked male torso found at Lohanipur, whether Mauryan or, more likely Kushana, is generally taken as indicative evidence of ascetic tradition in north India. Inscriptions from the many ayagapatas of the Mathura region make clear that puja to the tirthankaras with lay and ascetic involvement was an important dimension to this.

The earliest archeological evidence is in the form of a naked headless torso discovered in 1937 near Patna (Bihar), which is called the Lohanipur Torso. This has been dated by modern scholarship to about the 2nd-century BCE. It is a highly polished stone artwork of precise human form, but it is unclear if it belongs to Jainism, Ajivikas or some other Indian religious ascetic tradition. While it is not Buddhist, and is naked like the Jinas, it may also not be a Jain statue because it lacks the Jain iconography, and because similar high quality Jain artworks are missing for many centuries and Jain artworks that have been found from the same period in north India show quite different forms and symbols. It may belong to Ajivikas or another ancient Indian naked ascetic tradition. Ancient naked terracotta statues discovered in 1970s near Ayodhya are similar to the Lohanipur Torso, but terracotta arts are also missing in Jaina tradition and the Ayodhya terracotta statues too lack Jain iconography.

== Shravasti ==
Shravasti is often mentioned in Jaina sources. It is also called Chandrapuri or Chandrikapuri or Ārya Kṣetra, because Jaina texts state that two of their Tirthankaras were born here millions of years ago, in prehistoric times – Sambhavanatha (3rd of 24) and Chandraprabha (8th of 24). Sravasti is also known as the capital city of Kunala's kingdom.

Sambhavanatha is said to have had taken initiation, donated all his belongings, and broken his first fast in Sravasti after begging for alms from King Surendradatta. Munisuvrataswami, the 20th Tirthankara, visited Sravasti and initiated several members of the royal family. As per the Jaina text Jnatadharmakathah, Parshvanatha, the 23rd Tirthankara, also visited Sravasti and inspired several lay-followers to accept initiation.

Further, Shravasti is the place of the bitter arguments and meeting between Mahavira – the 24th Tirthankara, and Gosala Mankhaliputta – the founder of Ajivikas and a rival. According to the Jain texts, the Mahavira visited Shravasti many times and spent his tenth varsha monsoon season here before attaining omniscience. He was hosted by a wealthy merchant named Nandinipriya. Ancient Jain scholars such as Kapila, Maghavan and Keshi studied in Shravasti. At Sravasti, Jamāli, Mahavira's son-in-law, created the first of the eight heretical sects by opposing tenets of Jainism as taught by Mahavira himself. The eighth heretical sect, Digambara sect, was created by Sivabhuti at Rathavirapur. As described in the Jaina text Uttaradhyayana Sutra, the discussion between Keśiśramanācharya and Mahavira's first disciple, Gautama Swami, is said to have had taken place at Sravasti. This was the place where Upkeśa Gaccha was established by Keśiśramanācharya after he accepted Mahavira's conduct and became a white-clad monk along with all his disciples who were initially following Parshvanatha's conduct. Moreover, the Pattavali described in the Kalpa Sūtra, states the existence of "Śrāvastikā Śākhā", one of the four branches of the "Veṣavāṭikgaṇa" of the Jaina sangha. It had originated from Ācārya Kāmardhi, a disciple of Ācārya Suhastisuri, belonging to the beginning of the 3rd century BCE. Ācārya Jinaprabhasuri, in his Vividha Tirtha Kalpa confirms that a Jaina temple with an image of Sambhavanatha was renovated multiple times until it was finally completely desecrated during the reign of Alauddin Khilji.

== Bundelkhand ==
It is one of the few regions in India where Jainism has a strong presence and influence. There are many ancient tirthas in Bundelkhand. Many of the modern scholars of Jainism are from this region.

== Deogarh ==
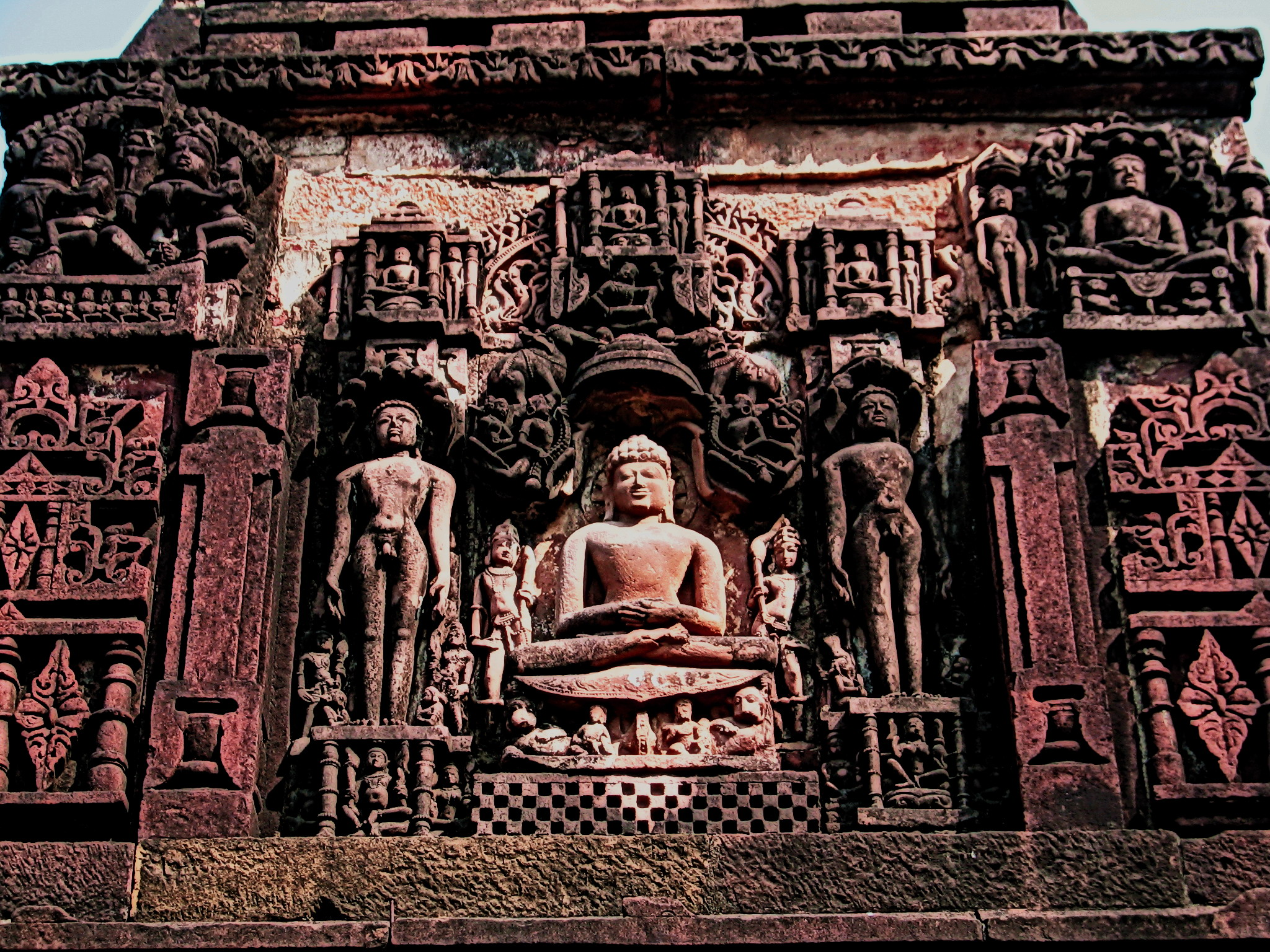
Images of tirthankaras in Deogarh fort temple

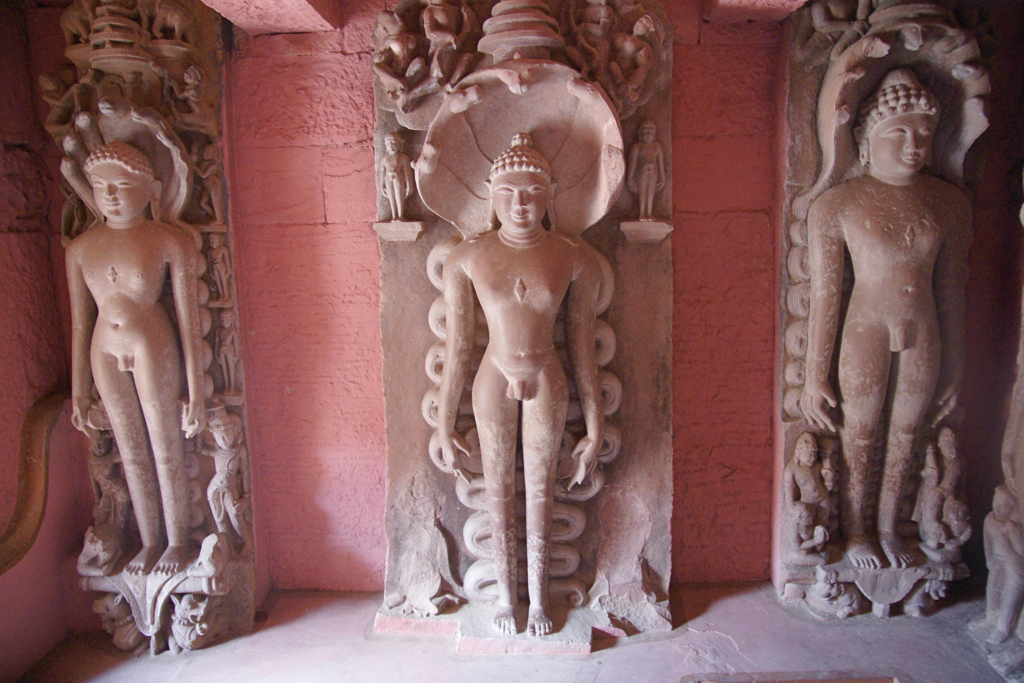
Pārśva & Supārśva

The fort temples are dominated by the Jain temples in the eastern part of the hill fort; the images here are mostly of the "iconographic and the stylistic variety". The Jain complex was built during 8th to the 17th century and consist of 31 Jain temples housing around 2,000 sculptures which is the largest such collection in the world. The Jain temples have a large number of panels depicting scenes from Jain philosophy, tirthankara images and votive tablets. The pillars are carved with a thousand figures. Worship at some of the Jain temples are still held regularly. The most famous of the Jain temples in the fort is the Shantinath temple, which was built before 862 AD. It is testament that a prosperous Jain community lived in this region. Jain temple complex in Deogarh is protected by the Department of Archaeology of the Archaeological Survey of India (ASI). ASI maintain an archaeological museum at the Deogarh site, which is noted for its treasured archaeological sculptures.

== Hastinapur ==
Hastinapur is an important Jain pilgrimage centre in Meerut district. According to Jain tradition, it is associated with three Tirthankaras—Shantinatha, Kunthunatha and Aranatha—as their birthplace. Jain tradition also associates Hastinapur with several significant events, including the Samavasarana of Mallinatha, the celebration of Raksha Bandhan associated with the liberation of Vishnukumar Muni's fellow ascetics, and the first āhāra (food offering) accepted by Rishabhanatha (Adinath) after his period of fasting. These traditions contribute to the town's religious significance in Jainism. Hastinapur is home to numerous Jain temples and pilgrimage sites associated with the Digambara traditions.

== Kankali Tila ==
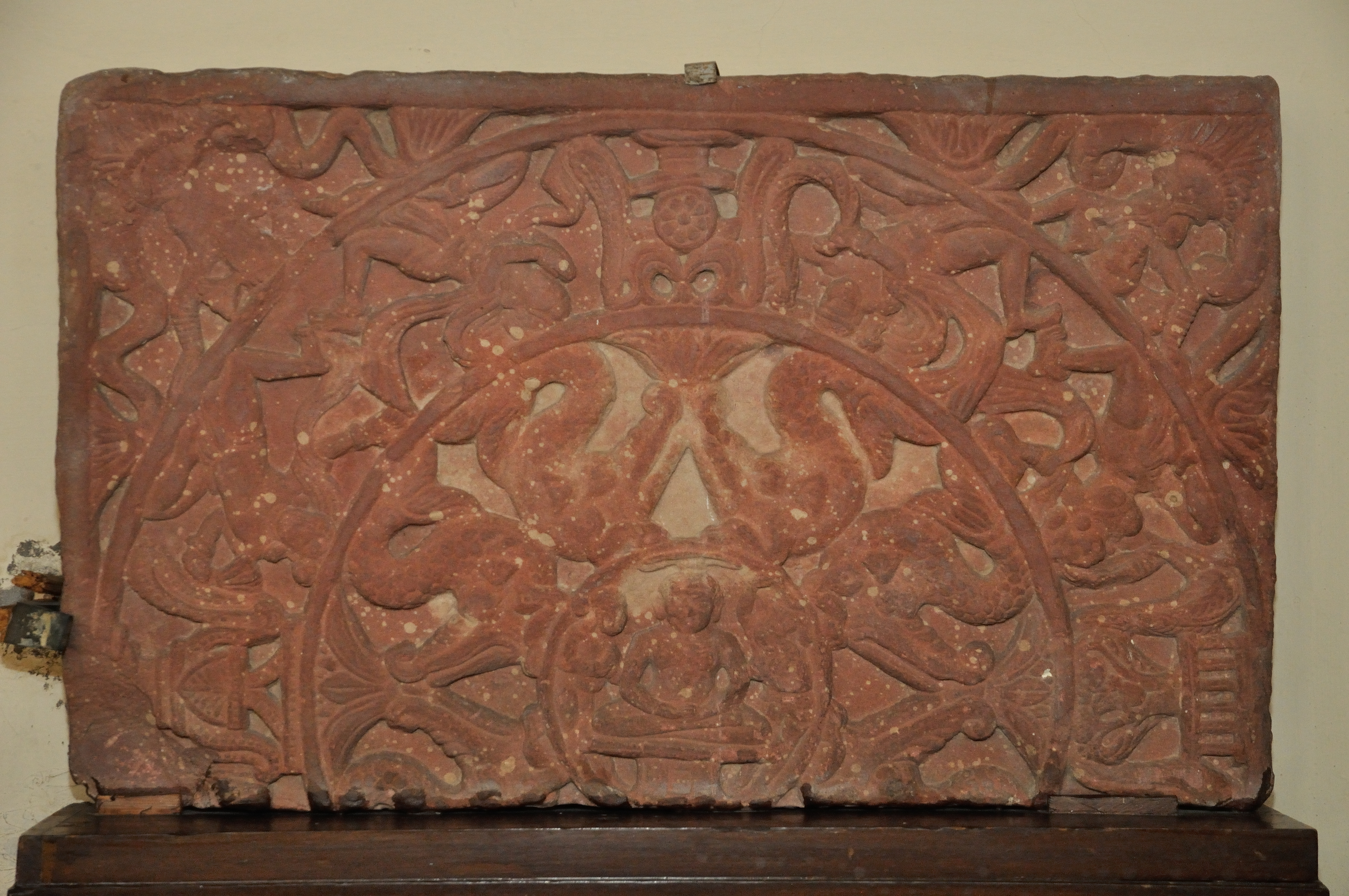
Ayagapatta, excavated from Kankali Tila, Mathura Museum, 1st century CE

Kankali Tila is a mound located at Mathura. The name of the mound is derived from a modern temple of Hindu goddess Kankali. The famous Jain stupa was excavated here in 1890-91 by Alois Anton Führer (Dr. Führer). The archaeological findings testifies the existence of two Jain temples and stupas. Numerous Jain sculptures, Ayagapattas (tablet of homage).

Most sculptures could be dated from the 2nd century BC to the 12th century CE, thus representing a continuous period of about 14 centuries during which Jainism flourished at Mathura. These sculptures are now housed in the Lucknow State Museum and in the Mathura Museum. The excavations of Kankali Tila are regarded as a testimony great antiquity of Jainism.

== Prominent Tirthas ==
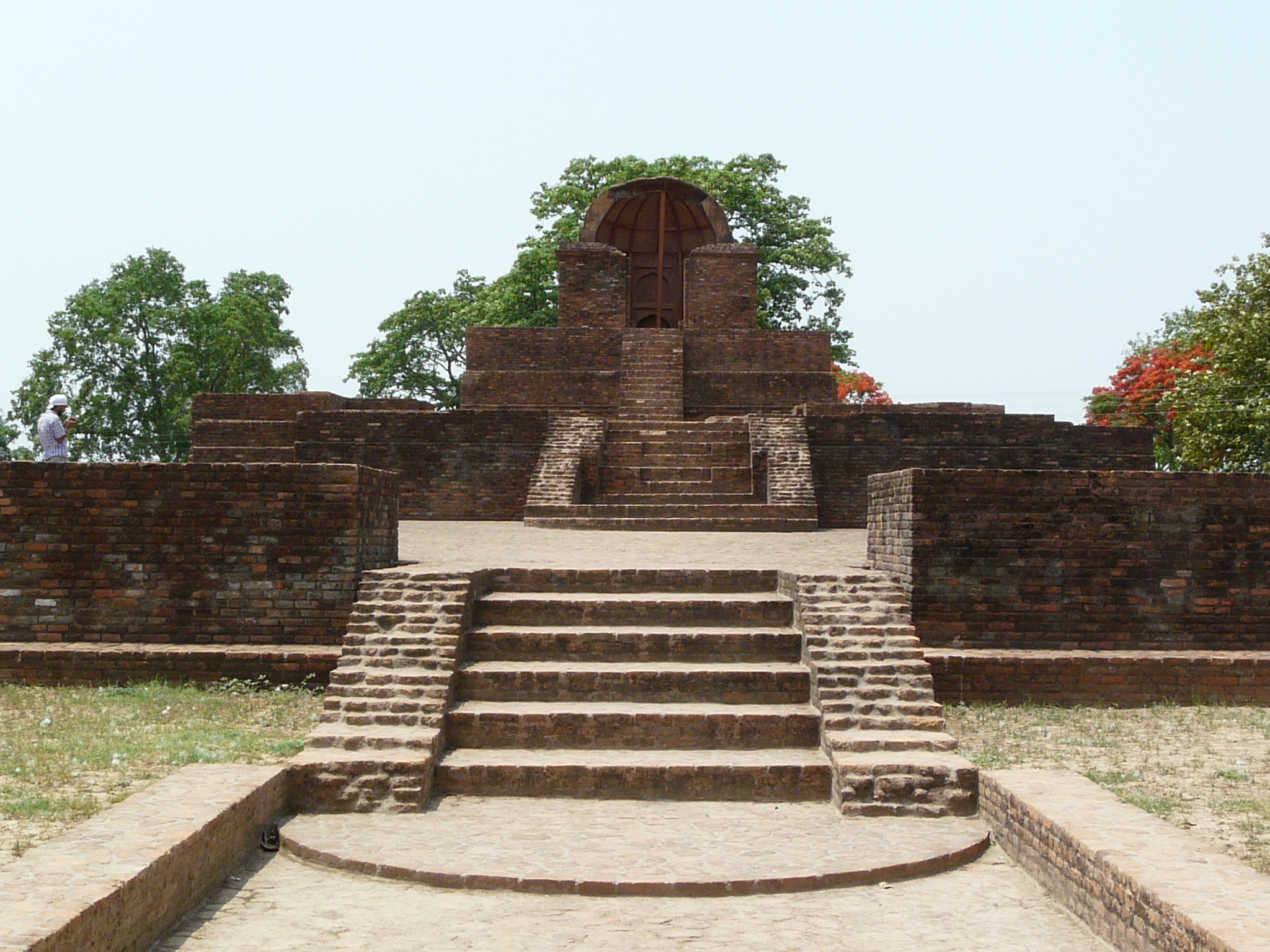
Shobhnath temple, Shravasti

- Shantinath Temple in Deogarh
- Digamber Jain Bada Mandir Hastinapur, Meerut
- Navagarh Tirth
- Kailash Parvat Rachna, Hastinapur, Meerut
- Ashtapad temple, Hastinapur, Meerut
- Jambu Dweep Rachana, Hastinapur, Meerut
- Ahi Kshetra
- Vahelna Jain temple
- Trilok Teerth Dham, Bada Gaon in Baghpat
- Parshvanath Jain temple in Varanasi
- Sarnath Jain Tirth at Sarnath, Varanasi
- Chandrawati Jain temple near Varanasi
- Shobhnath temple, Shravasti
- Shri Shouripur Digambar Jain Siddha Kshetra, Bateshwar
- Shri Vimalnath Digambar Jain Atishay Kshetra in Kampil, Farrukhabad district
- Shree Parsvnath Atishey Kshetra Digamber Jain mandir, Bada Gaon in Baghpat
- Shri Chintamani Parshwnath Jain Shwetambar Mandir, Haridwar
- Khukhundoo

== Photo gallery ==
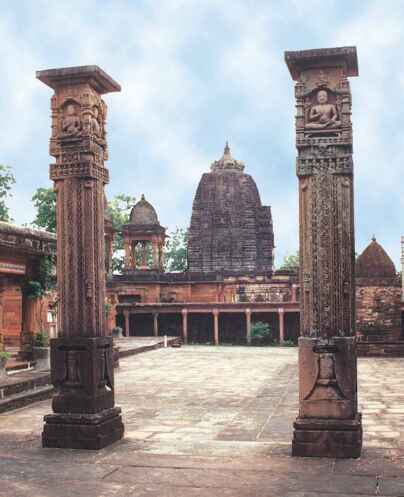
Shantinath Temple, Deogarh, Uttar Pradesh

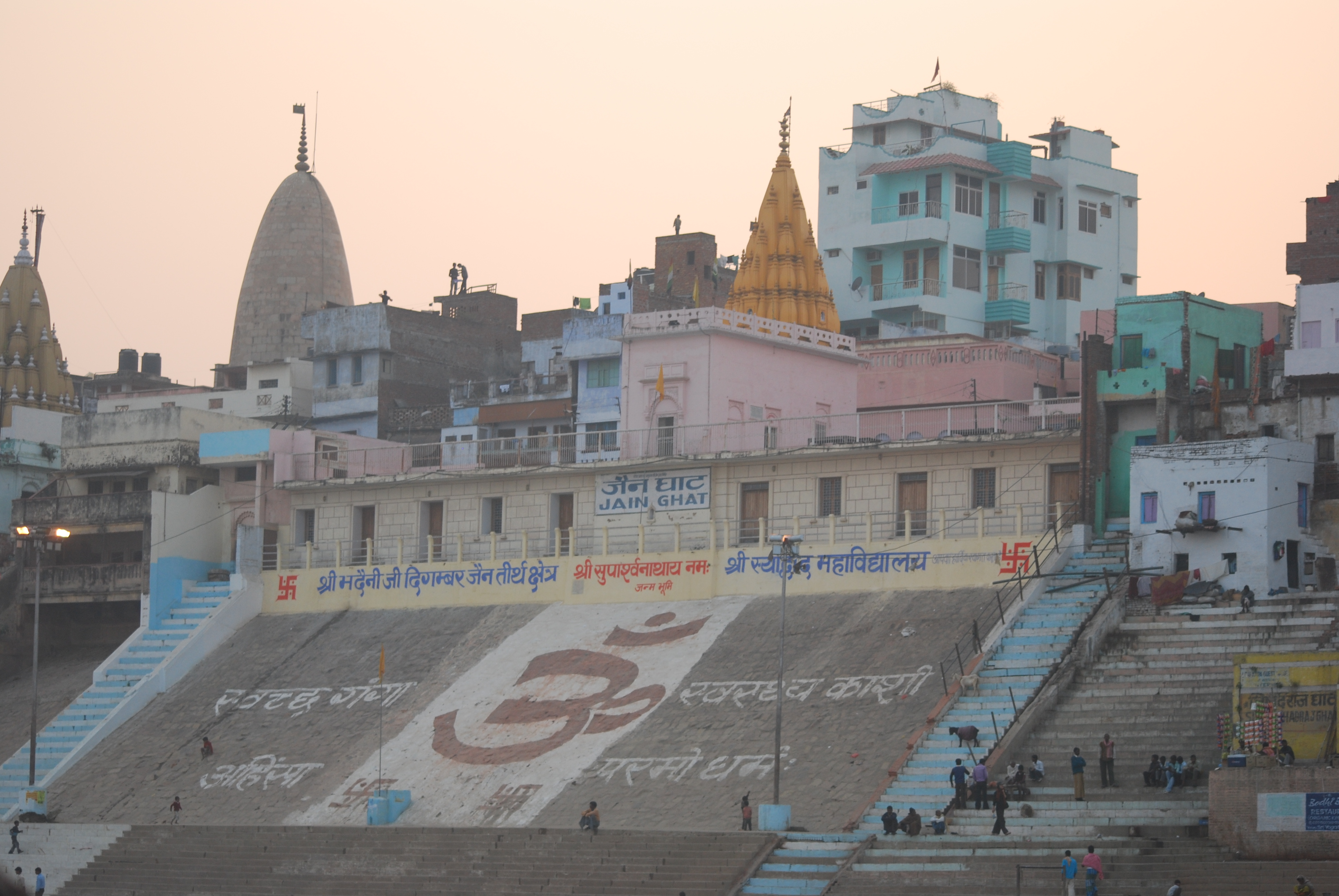
Jain Ghat, Varanasi, UP, India

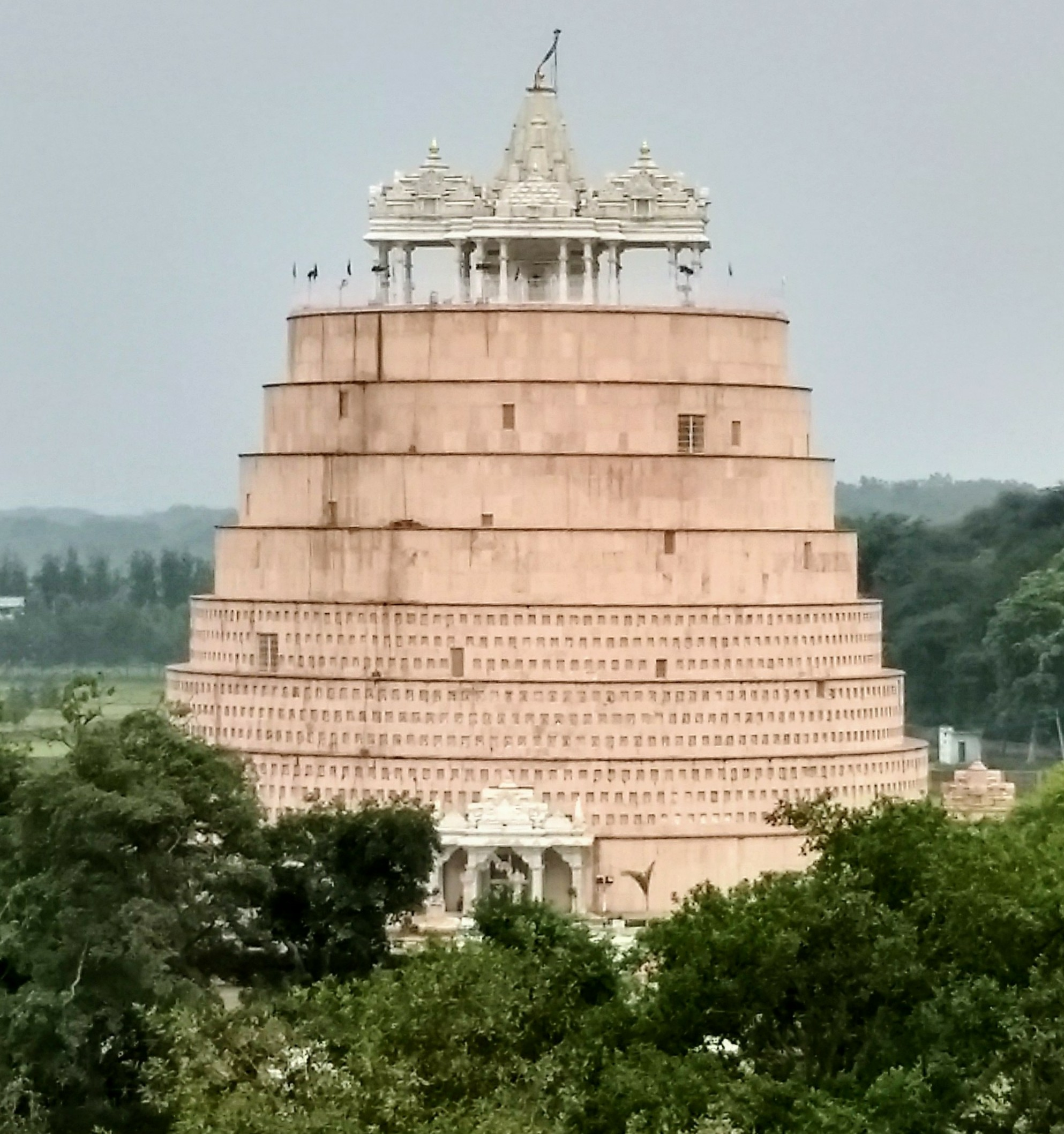
Ashtapad

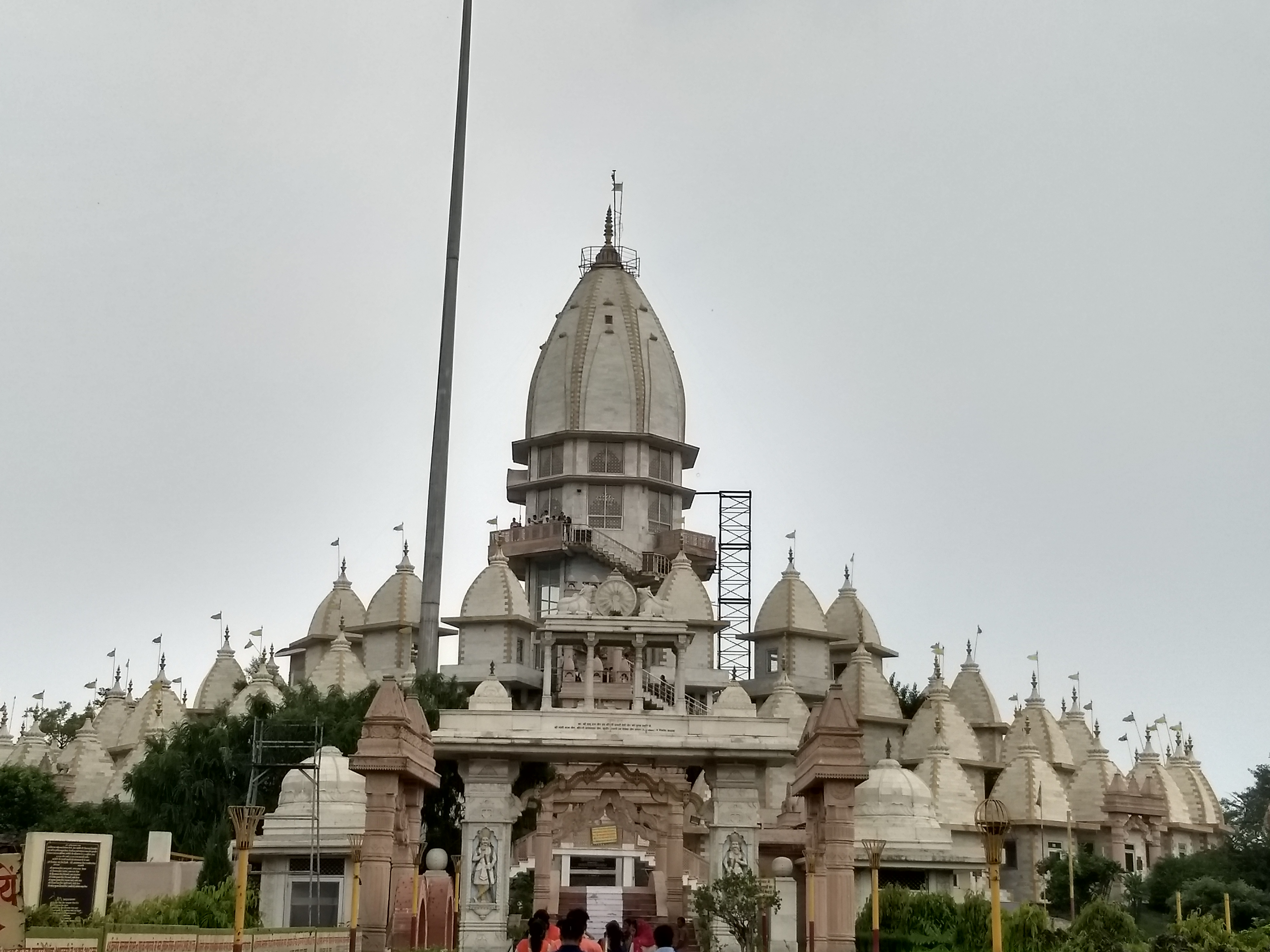
Kailash Parvat Rachna

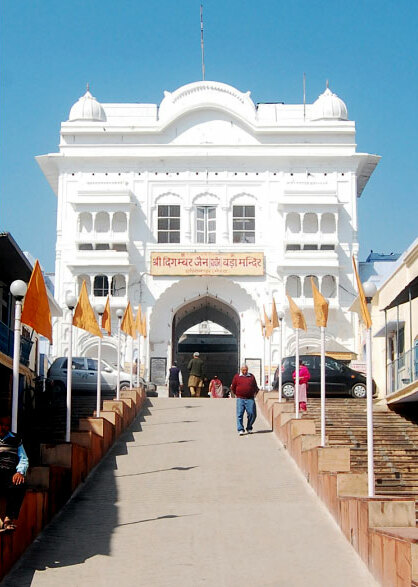
Prachin Bada Mandir

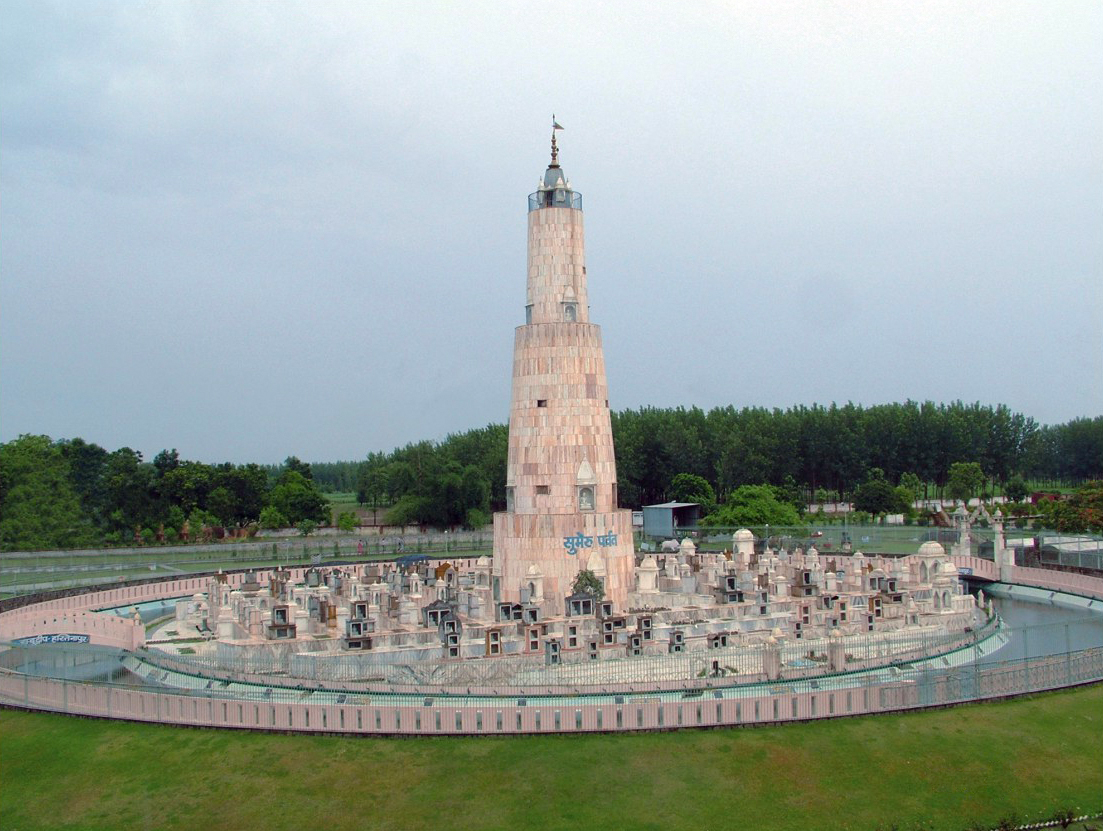
Jambudweep Rachna

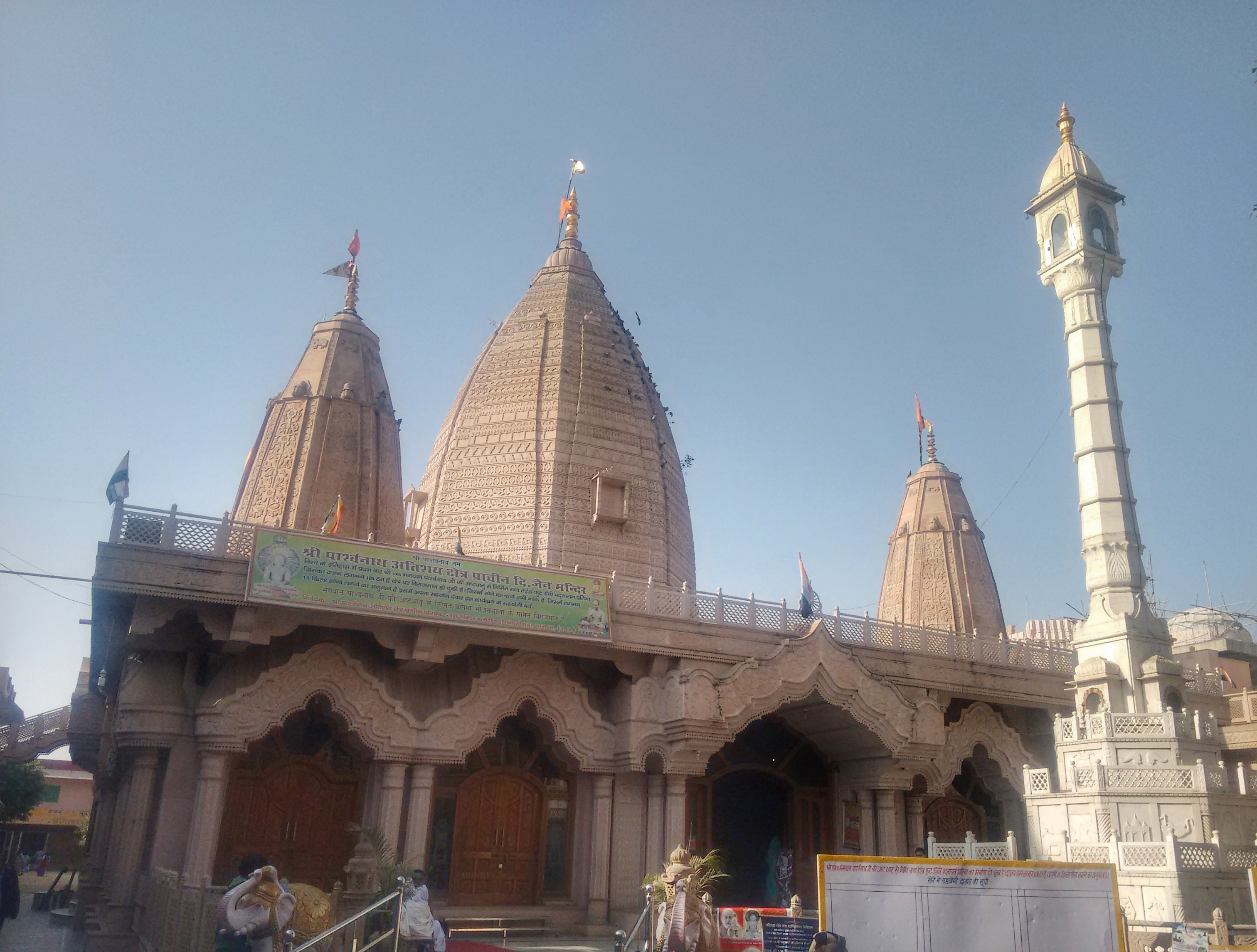
Bada Gaon temple

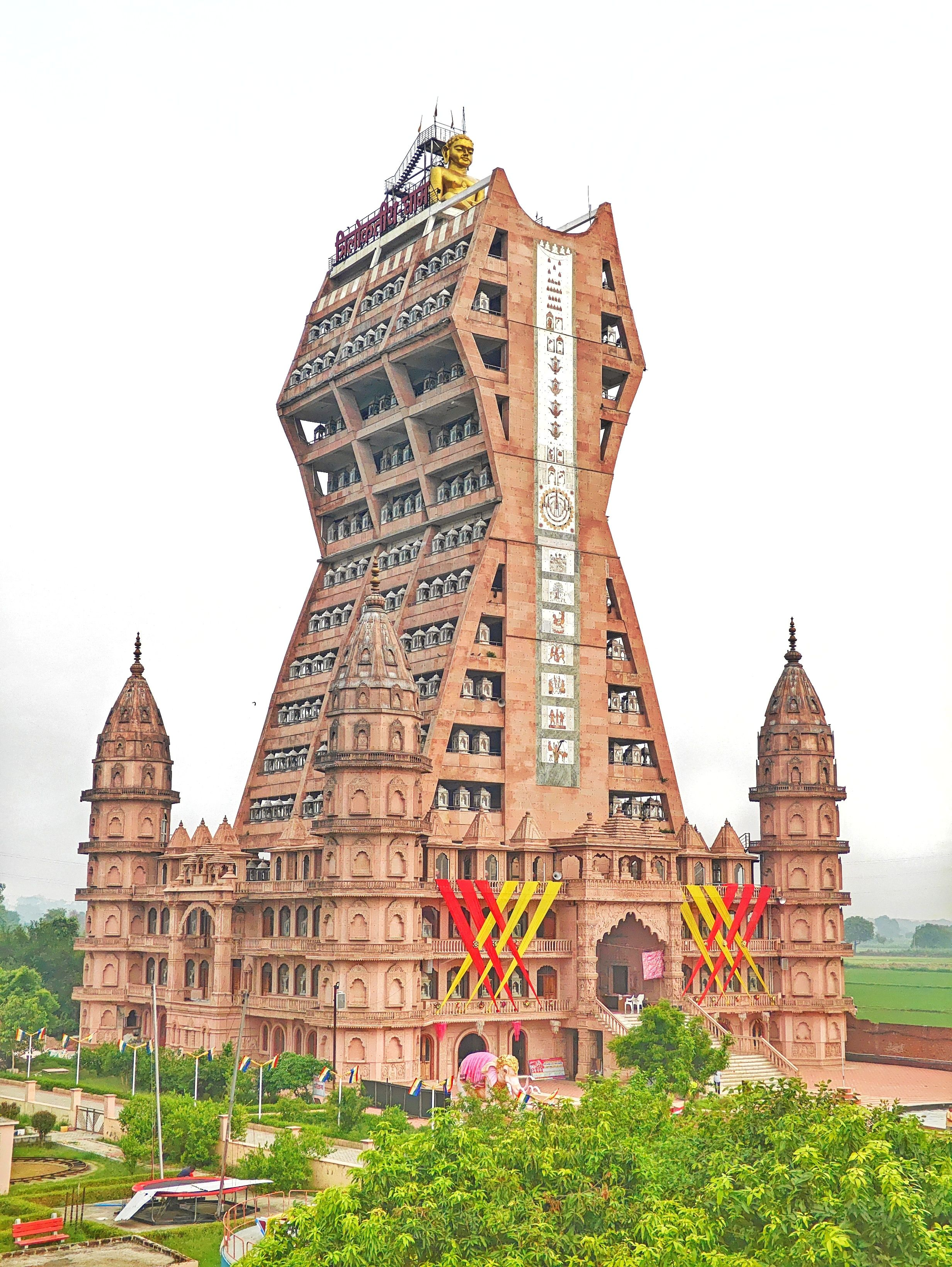
Trilok Teerth Dham

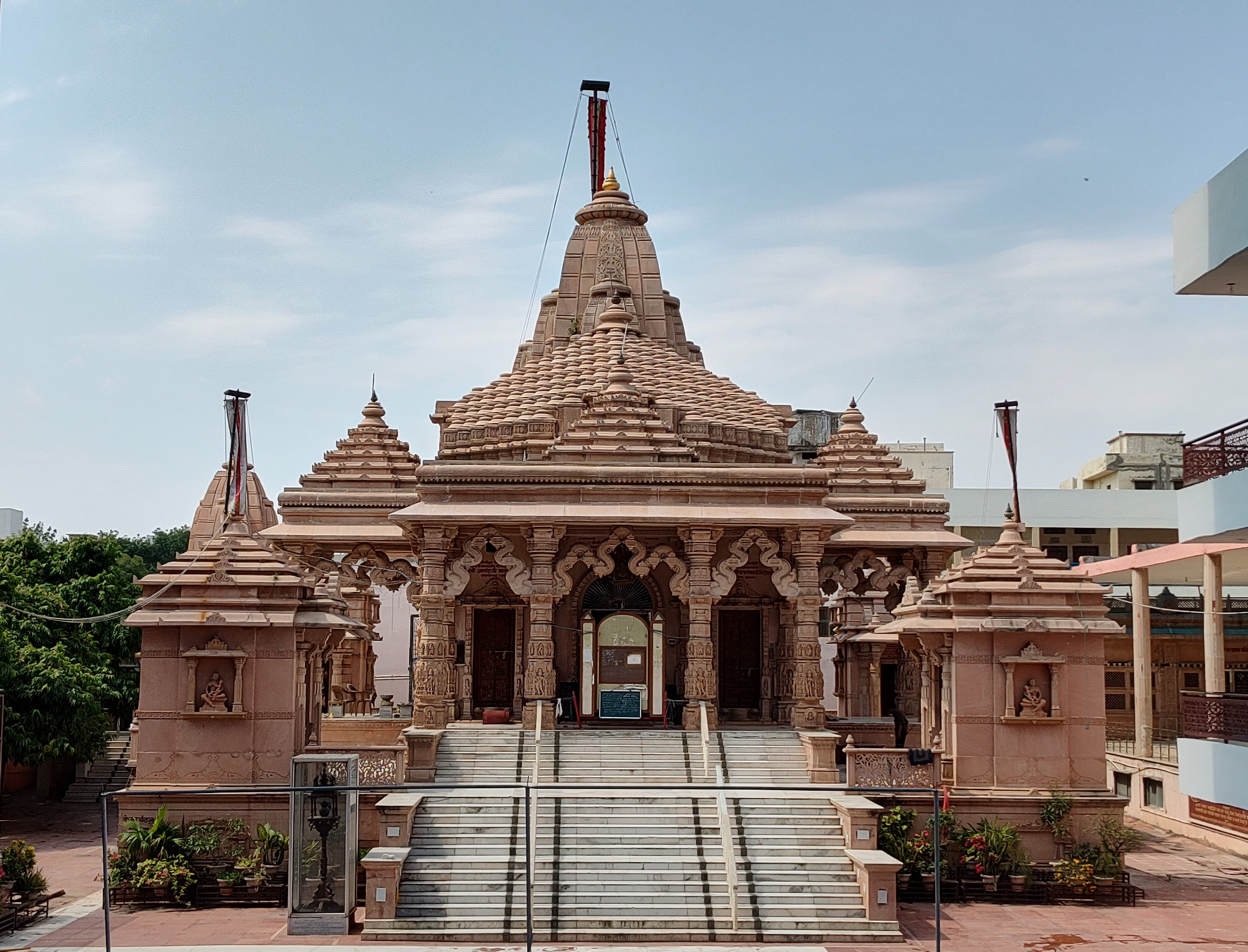
Parshvanath Jain temple, Varanasi

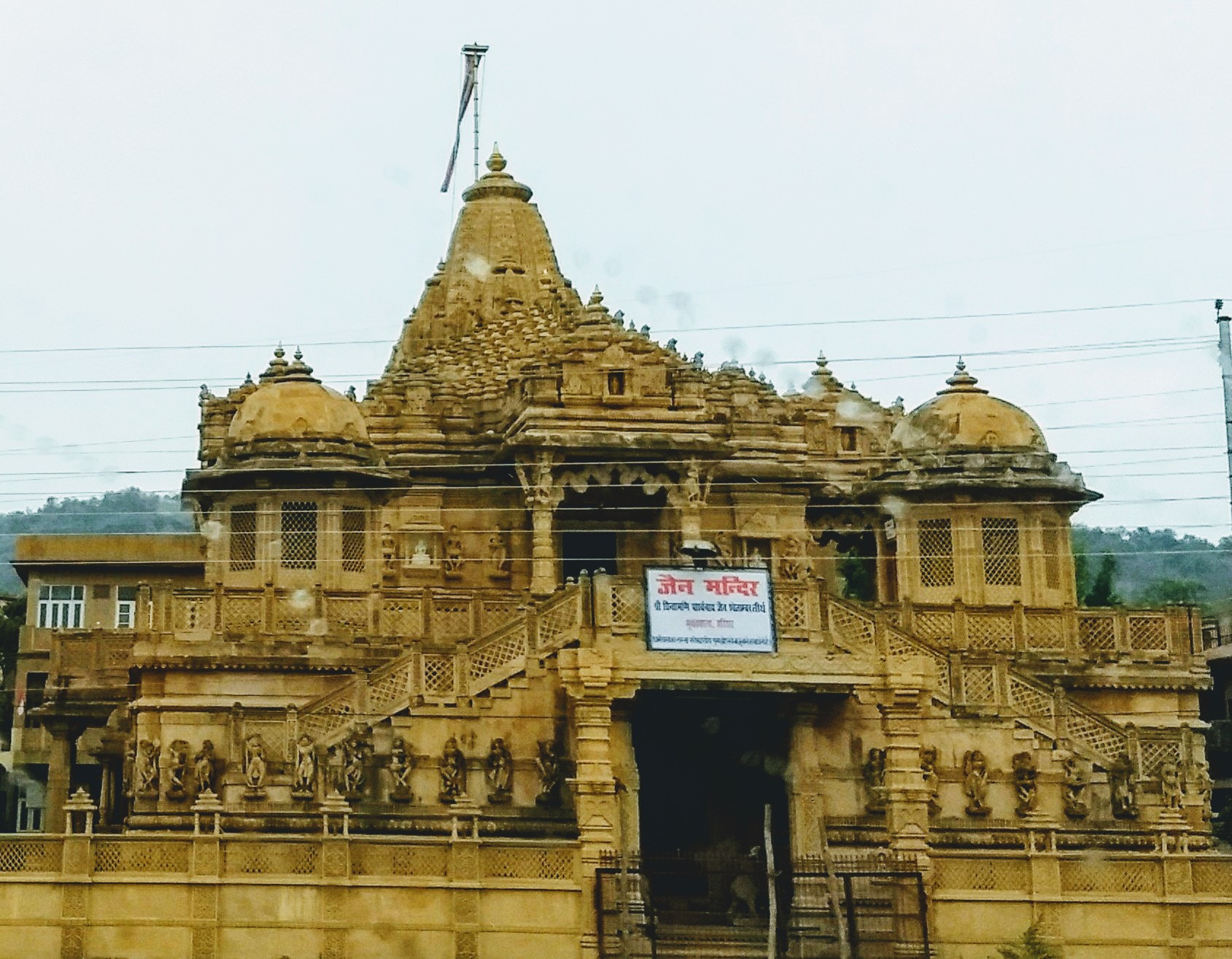
Shri Chintamani Parshwnath temple, Haridwar

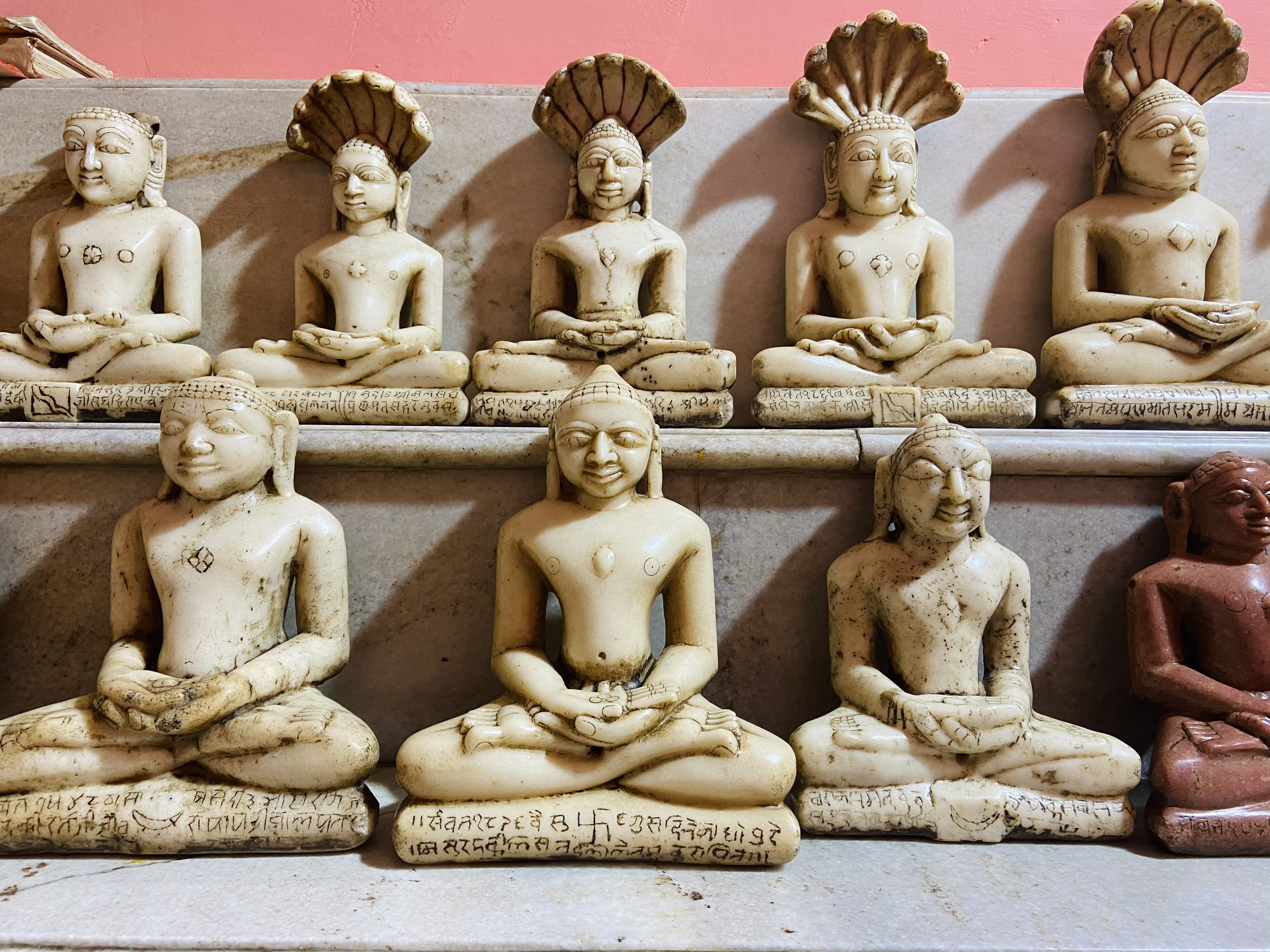
Agra Jain temple
