= Murali Manohar Mandir =

Lord Krishna temple in Mithila

Coordinates: 26°21′31″N 86°04′25″E

- मुरली मनोहर मंदिर
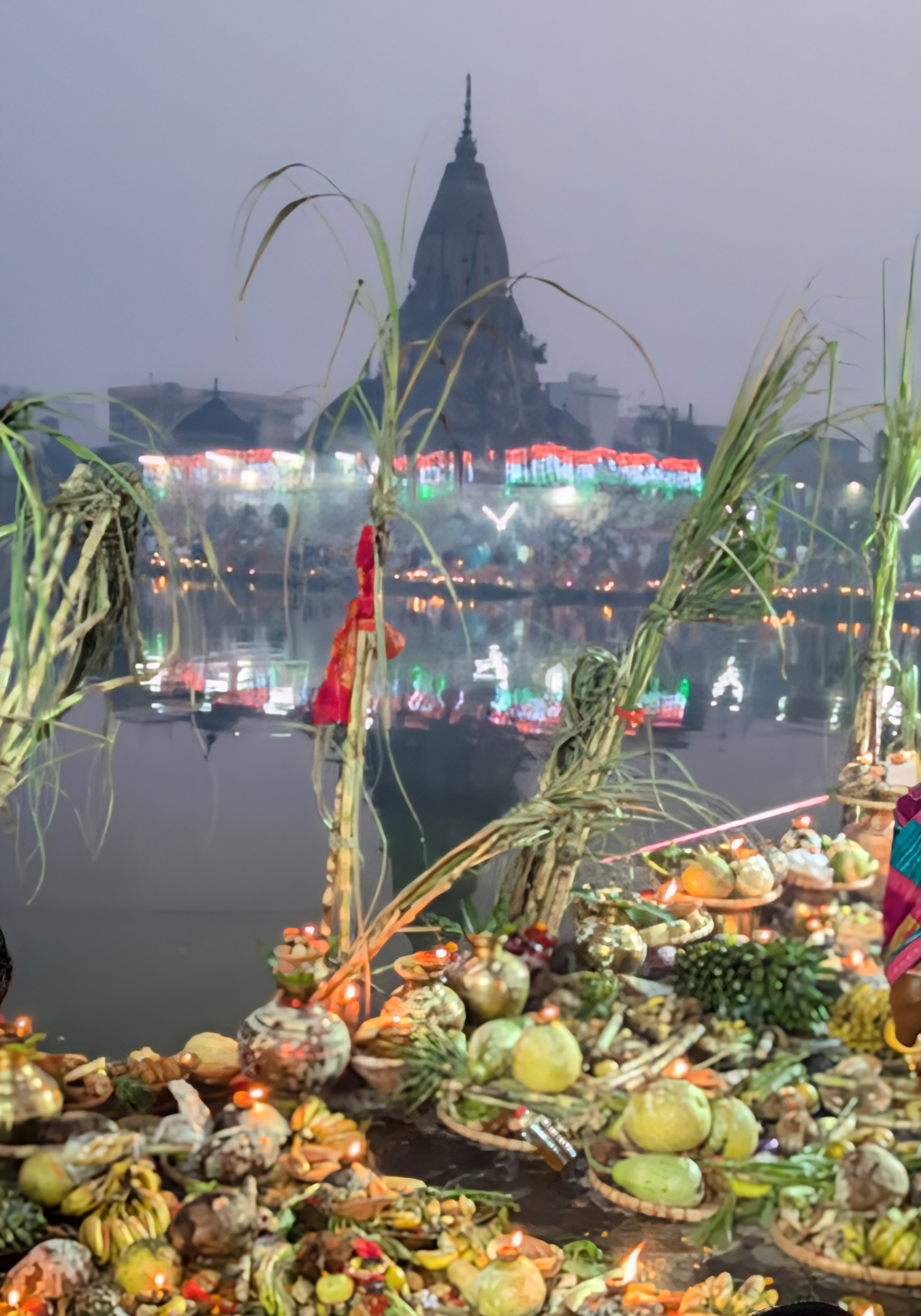
- View of the Murali Manohar Mandir during the festival of Chhath Puja

Religion
- Affiliation: Hinduism
- District: Madhubani district
- Deity: Lord Krishna

Location
- Location: Babu Saheb Chowk, Mithila region
- State: Bihar
- Country: India

Architecture
- Established: 18th-19th century CE
- An iconic temple of Lord Krishna in Mithila

Murali Manohar Mandir (Maithili: मुरली मनोहर मंदिर) is an iconic temple of Lord Krishna in the Mithila region of the Indian subcontinent. It is located at the Babu Saheb Chowk in the city of Madhubani in Bihar. It is a temple of the period 18th-19th century. The temple was built by the Maharaja of Raj Darbhanga.

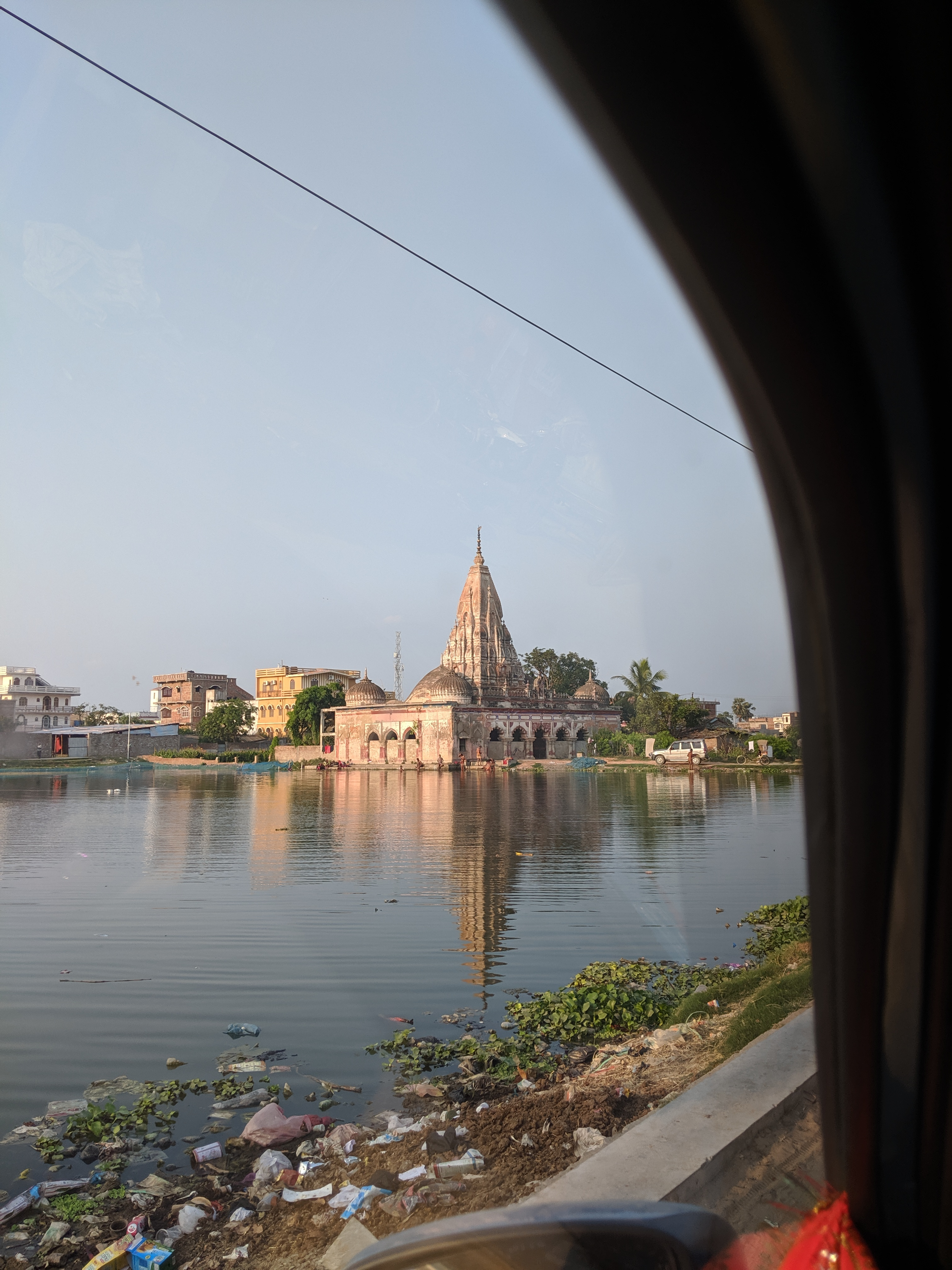
Murali Manohar Mandir in Madhubani

== History ==
The iconic temple Murali Manohar Mandir was built by the prince Kirti Singh of the Raj Darbhanga. It was built during the period of 1850–1860 AD.

== Description ==
In the temple, two idols of Lord Krishna made from ashtadhatu were installed. In the year 2015, the two idols of Lord Krishna were stolen. The height of the bigger idol was 2.5 feet, and its weight was 50 kg; the height of the second idol was 1/2 foot, and its weight was 5 kg. According to the descendants of the founder family of the temple, the cost of the stolen idols might be 20 to 25 crore rupees.
