= Bada Gaon temple =

Jain temple in Baghpat, Uttar Pradesh, India

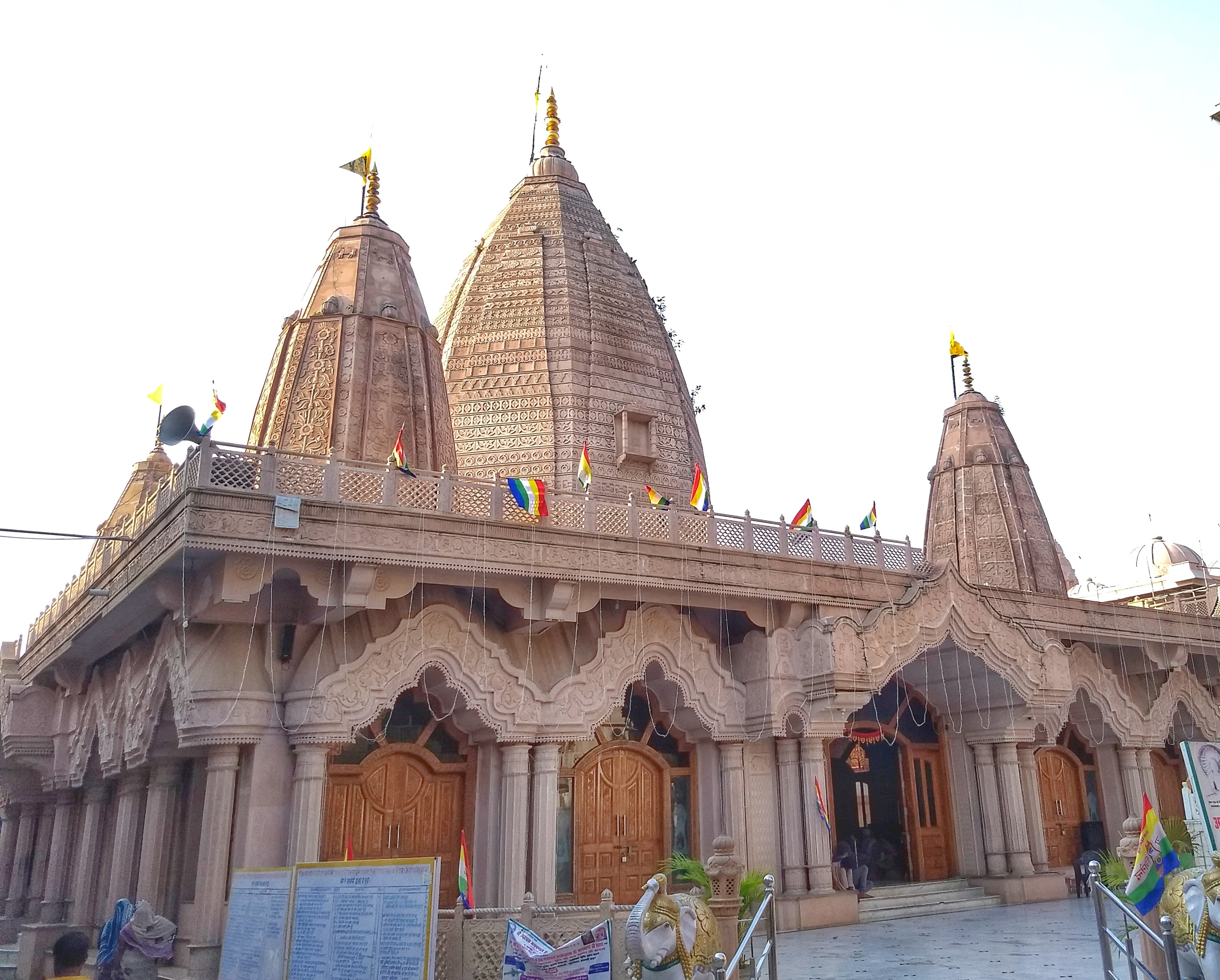
- Bada Gaon old temple

- Location within Uttar Pradesh

Religion
- Affiliation: Jainism
- Sect: Digambar
- Deity: Parshvanatha
- Festivals: Mahavir Jayanti, Parshvanatha Nirvana Kalnayak
- Governing body: Shri Parshwanath Atishaya Kshetra Prachin Digambar Jain Mandir Committee

Location
- Location: Bada Gaon, Baghpat
- Interactive map of Bada Gaon temple
- Coordinates: 28°52′30.6″N 77°20′4.8″E

Architecture
- Established: 1922

Website
- https://jaintemplebadagaon.com/

Bada Gaon Jain temple is a Jain temple in Bada Gaon, Baghpat, Uttar Pradesh.

== Location ==
Bada Gaon Jain temple is situated in Khekra in "Parshvanatha Atishaya Kshetra", Bada Gaon, Uttar Pradesh.

== Shri Parshwanath Atishaya Kshetra Prachin Digambar Jain Mandir ==
This centuries old temple is dedicated to Parshvanatha, the 23rd tirthankar. Moolnayak of this temple is a white marble idol of Parshvanatha which was recovered from a well inside the temple. The idol is considered miraculous as well as water of the well is believed to have curative powers. Apart from the main idol, several other idols were also discovered during excavation which have also been installed in separate altars.

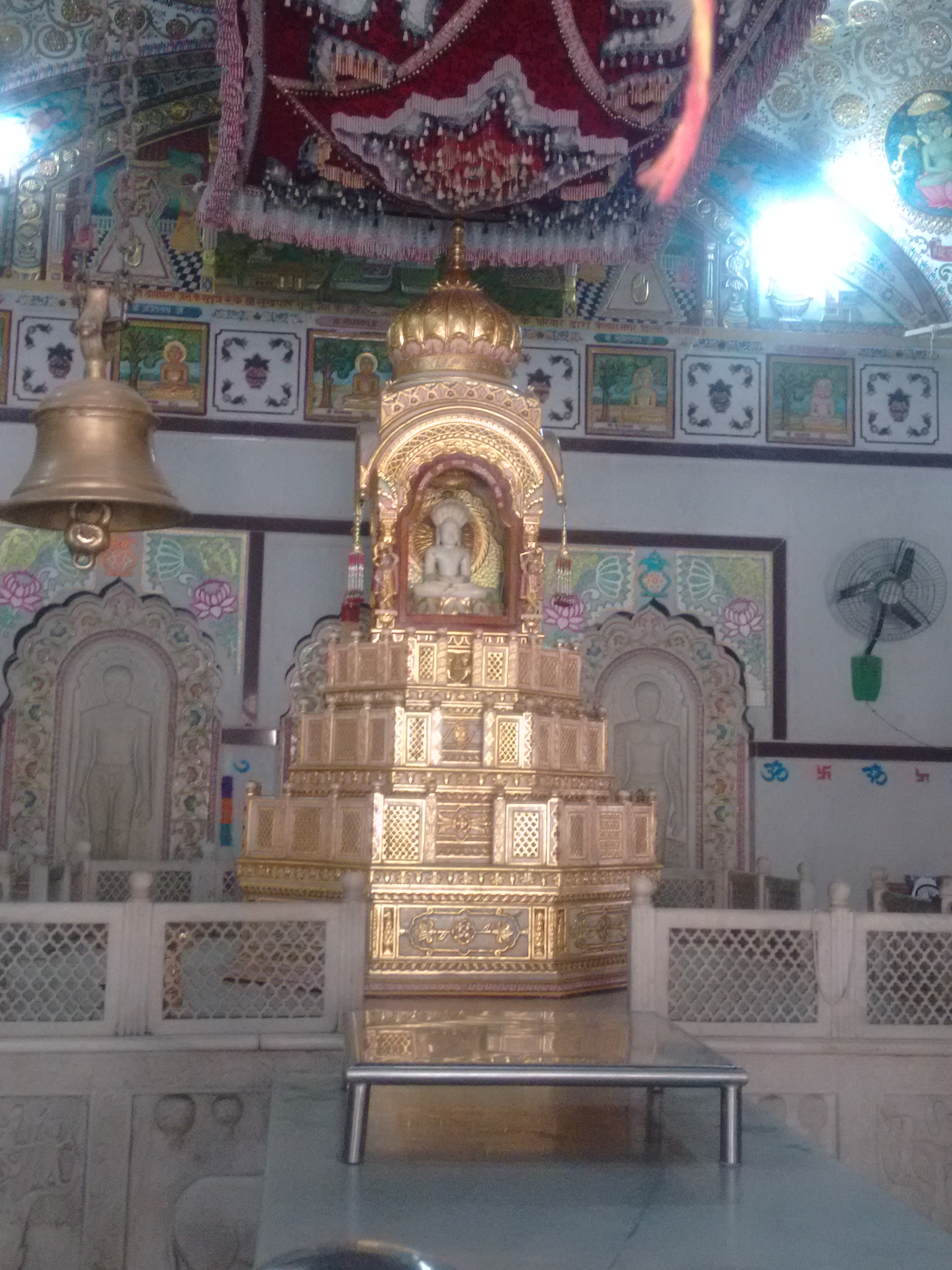
Main idol of Parshvantha

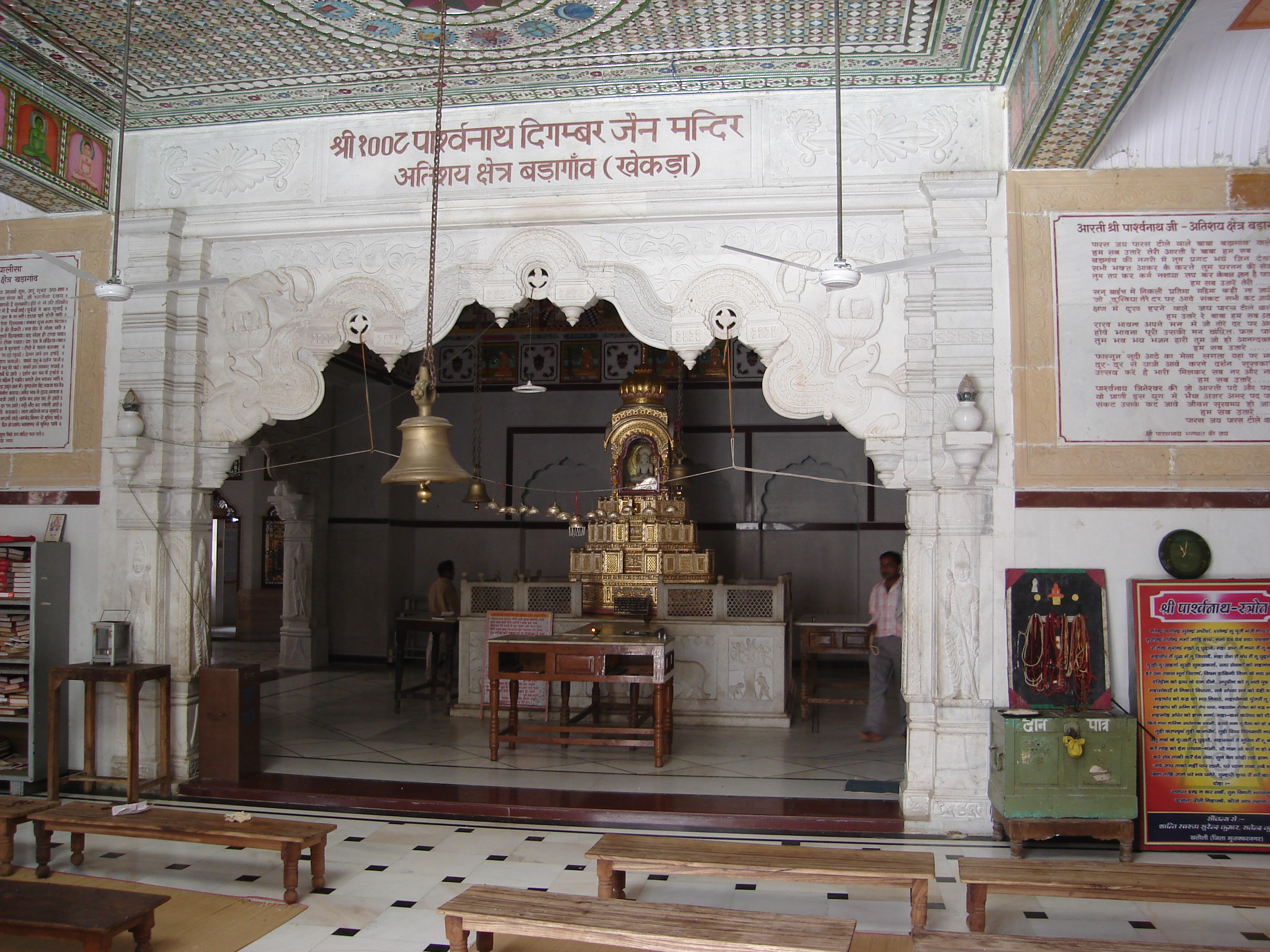
Main vedi at Bada Gaon, Khekada, Baghpat, Uttar Pradesh, India

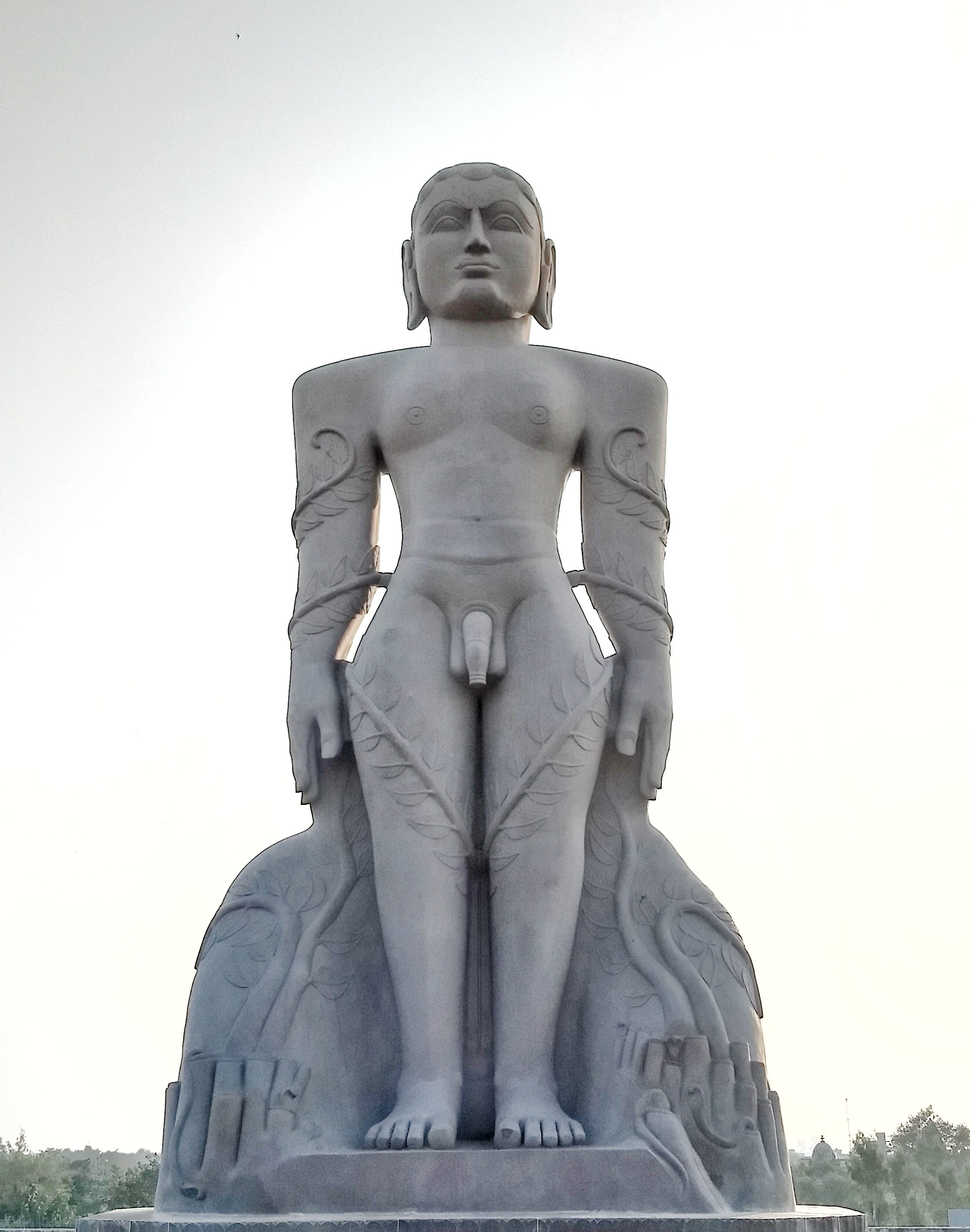
31 feet statue of Bahubali

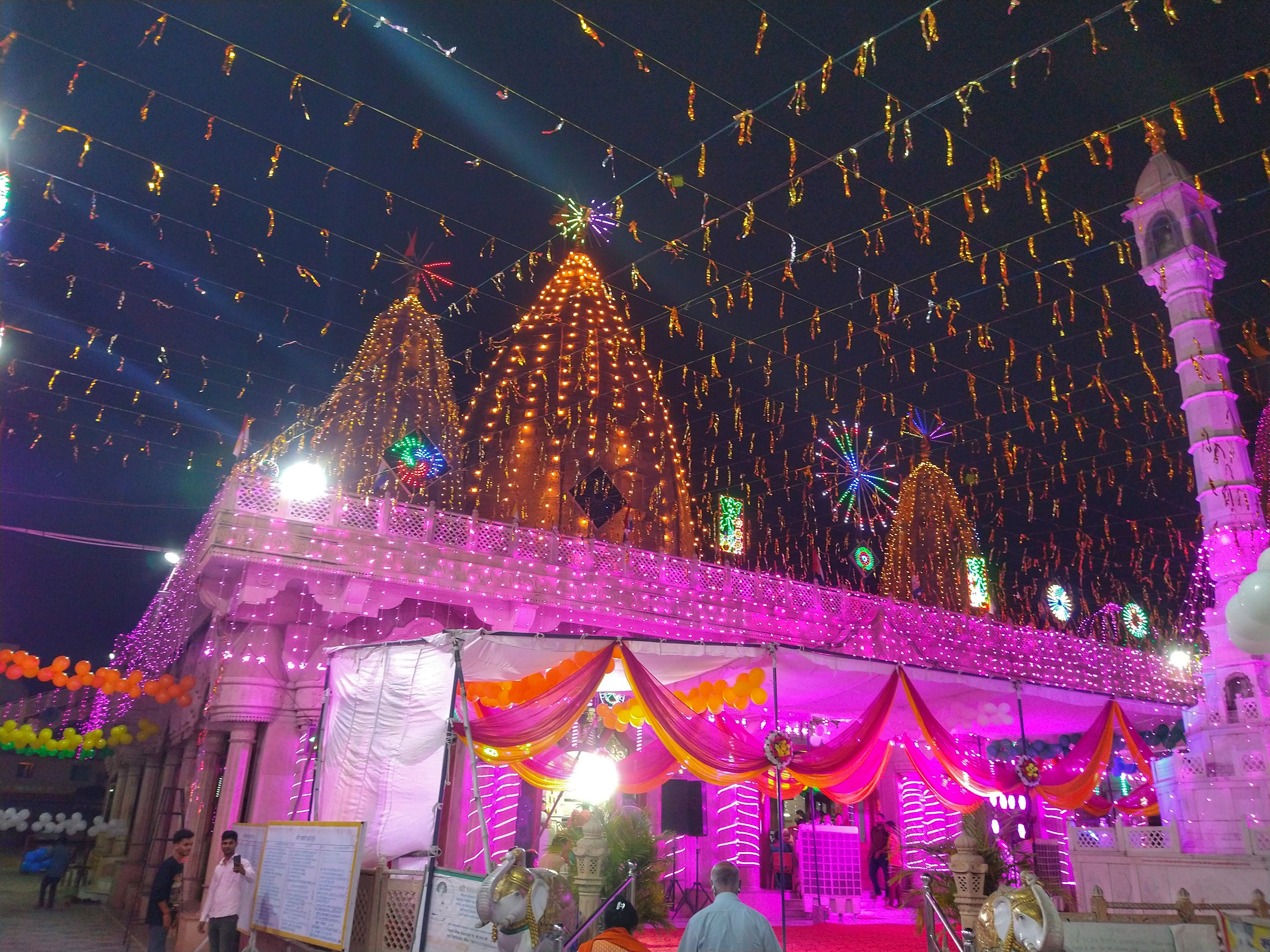
Temple during Parshvanatha Nirvana Kalnayak celebration

== See also ==
- Prachin Digambar Jain Mandir
- Trilok Teerth Dham
- Bada Gaon
