= Trilok Teerth Dham =

Jain temple in Bada Gaon, India

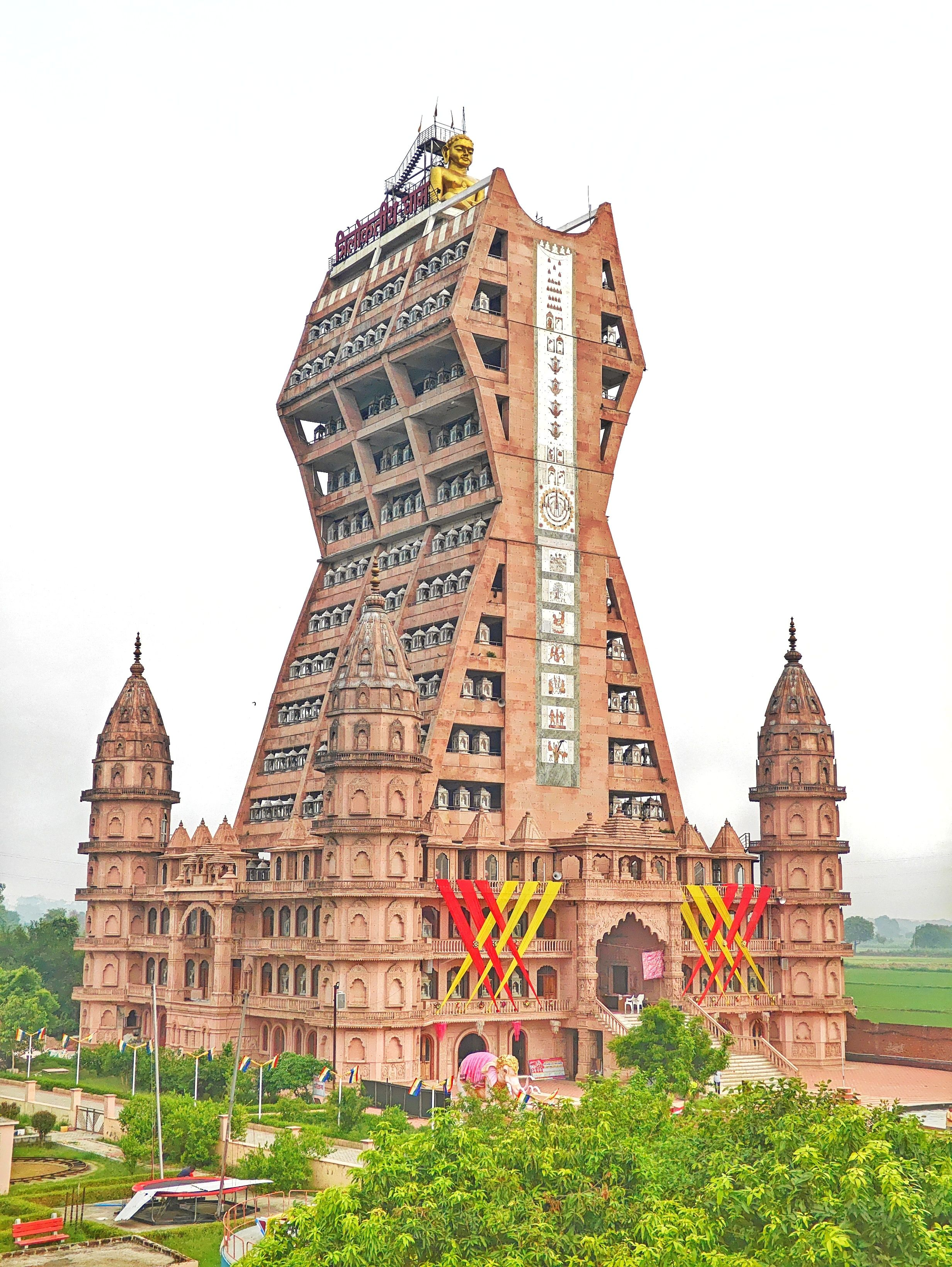
- Trilok Teerth Dham

- Location within Uttar Pradesh

Religion
- Affiliation: Jainism
- Sect: Digambar
- Deity: Parshvanatha
- Festivals: Mahavir Jayanti, Parshvanatha Nirvana Kalnayak
- Governing body: Shri Parsvanath Digamber Jain Syadwad Trust

Location
- Location: Bada Gaon, Baghpat
- Coordinates: 28°52′38.8″N 77°20′1.4″E

Architecture
- Creator: Acharya Sanmati Sagar
- Established: 1998
- Temple: 3

Website
- www.trilokteerthdham.com

Trilok Teerth Dham is a Jain temple in Bada Gaon, Baghpat, Uttar Pradesh, India.

== History ==
Trilok Teerth Dham was initiated by Jain Aacharya Sanmati Sagar near the Parshvanatha temple, Badagaon. The temple construction was completed in 2015.

== Location ==
Trilok Teerth Dham is situated in Khekra in "Parshvanatha Atishaya Kshetra", Bada Gaon, Uttar Pradesh.

== Architecture ==
Trilok Teerth Dham is built in the shape of Jain emblem. The temple structure is the representation of trilok (three lokas) of the Jain cosmology i.e. Adholok, Madhyalok and Urdhvalok. The temple architecture reflect features of Sultanate and Mughal architecture, such as, structure and symmetric arrangement of the four towers in the corner. However, instead of dome or a tower, these four corner tower are built around geometrical shape of the cosmos.

This temple also has a 108 feet Manasthamb (tower of pride).

== About the Temple ==
This temple, built in shape of Jain emblem, is 317 feet (97 m) tall structure with 100 feet (30 m) below the ground-level and 217 feet (66 m) above the ground-level. The temple enshrines a 31 feet (9.4 m) ashtadhatu (8 metals) idol of Rishabhanatha seated in lotus position. This temple is dedicated to Parshvantha. This temple also has a 108 feet Manasthamb (tower of pride).

As the name suggests trilok teerth depicts the three lokas of Jain cosmology i.e. Adholok, Madhyalok and Urdhvalok. Light and sound show is organised in this temple.

This temple includes a meditation center, Samavasarana, Nandishwar Dweep, Trikaal Chaubisi, Meru Temple, Lotus Temple, Parshvanath temple, Jambudweep. The temple also has a dharamshala equipped with all modern facilities. The Trilok Teerth was constructed by Aacharya Shri Vidyabhushan Sanmati Sagar Ji Maharaj.

== Gallery ==
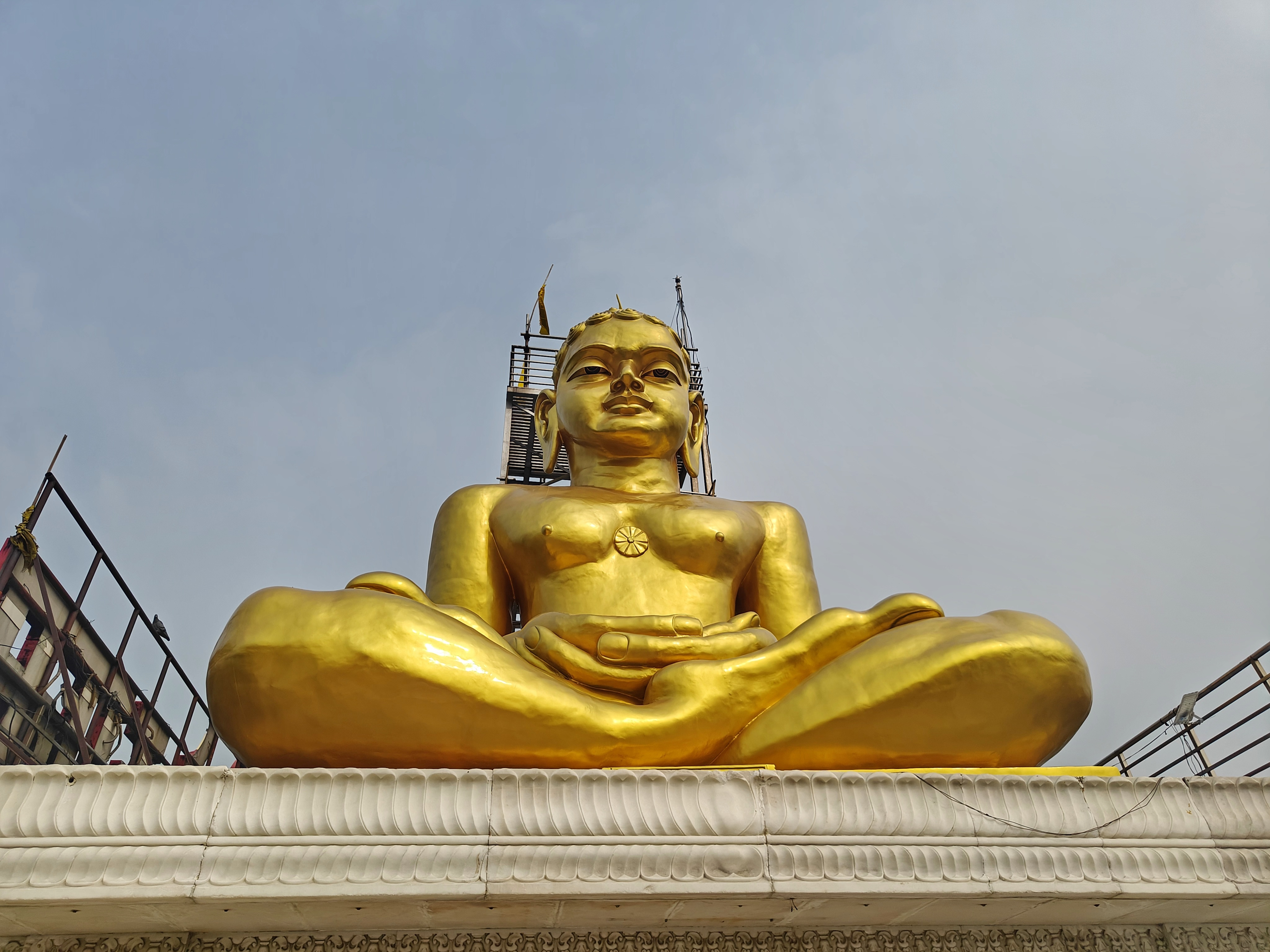
31 feet tall statue of Rishabhdev made up of Ashtadhatu

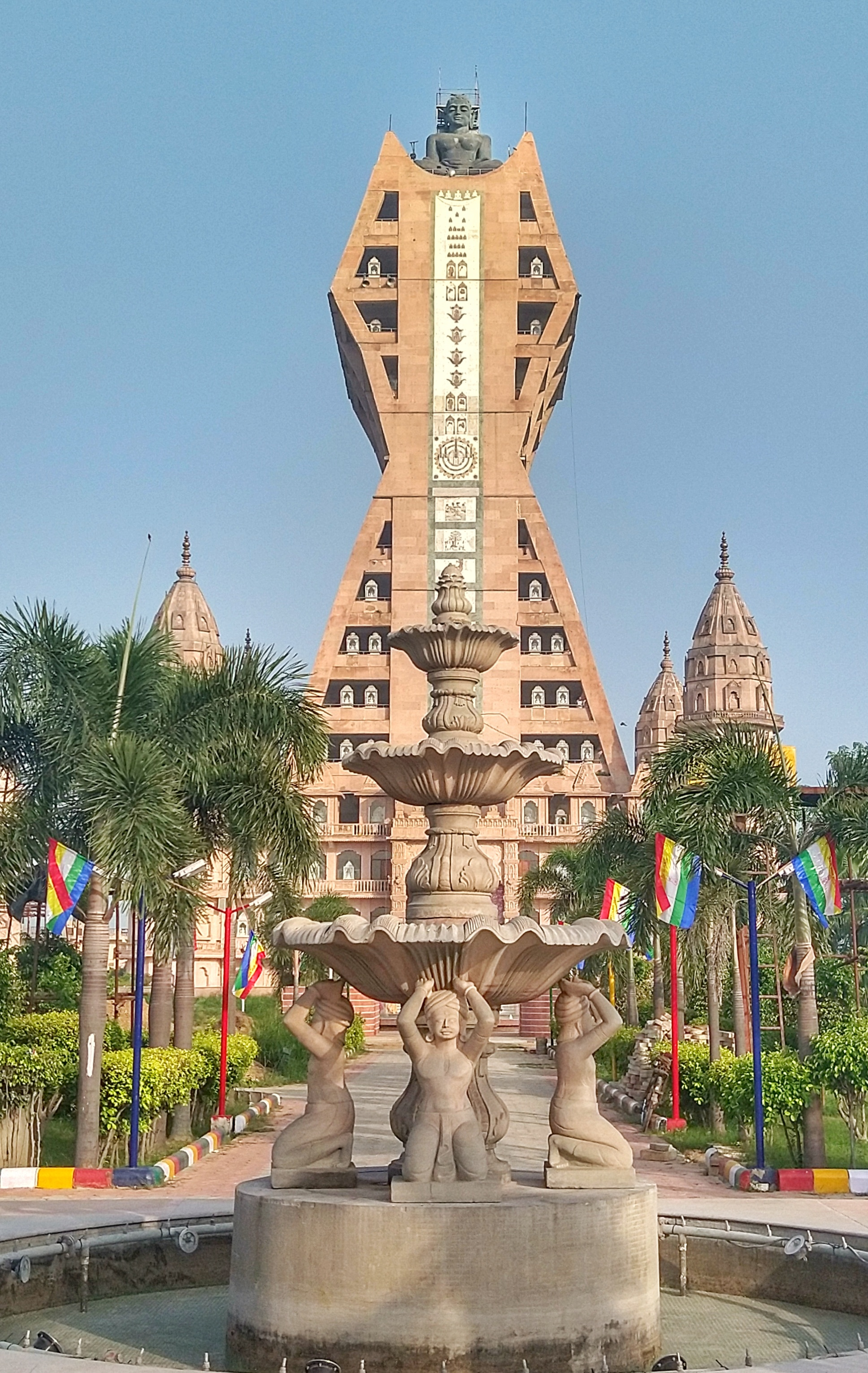
Trilok Teerth Dham front view

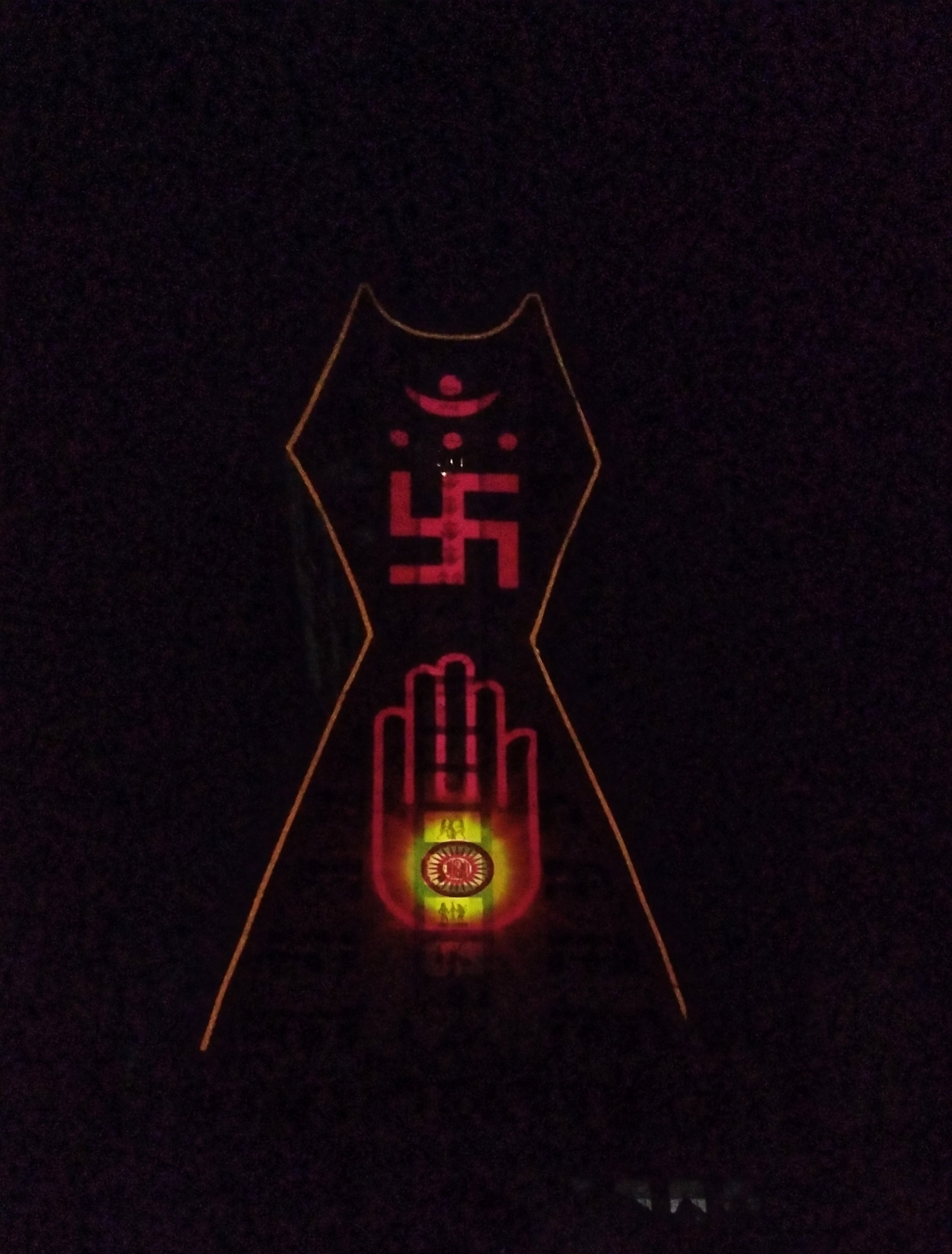
Light & music show

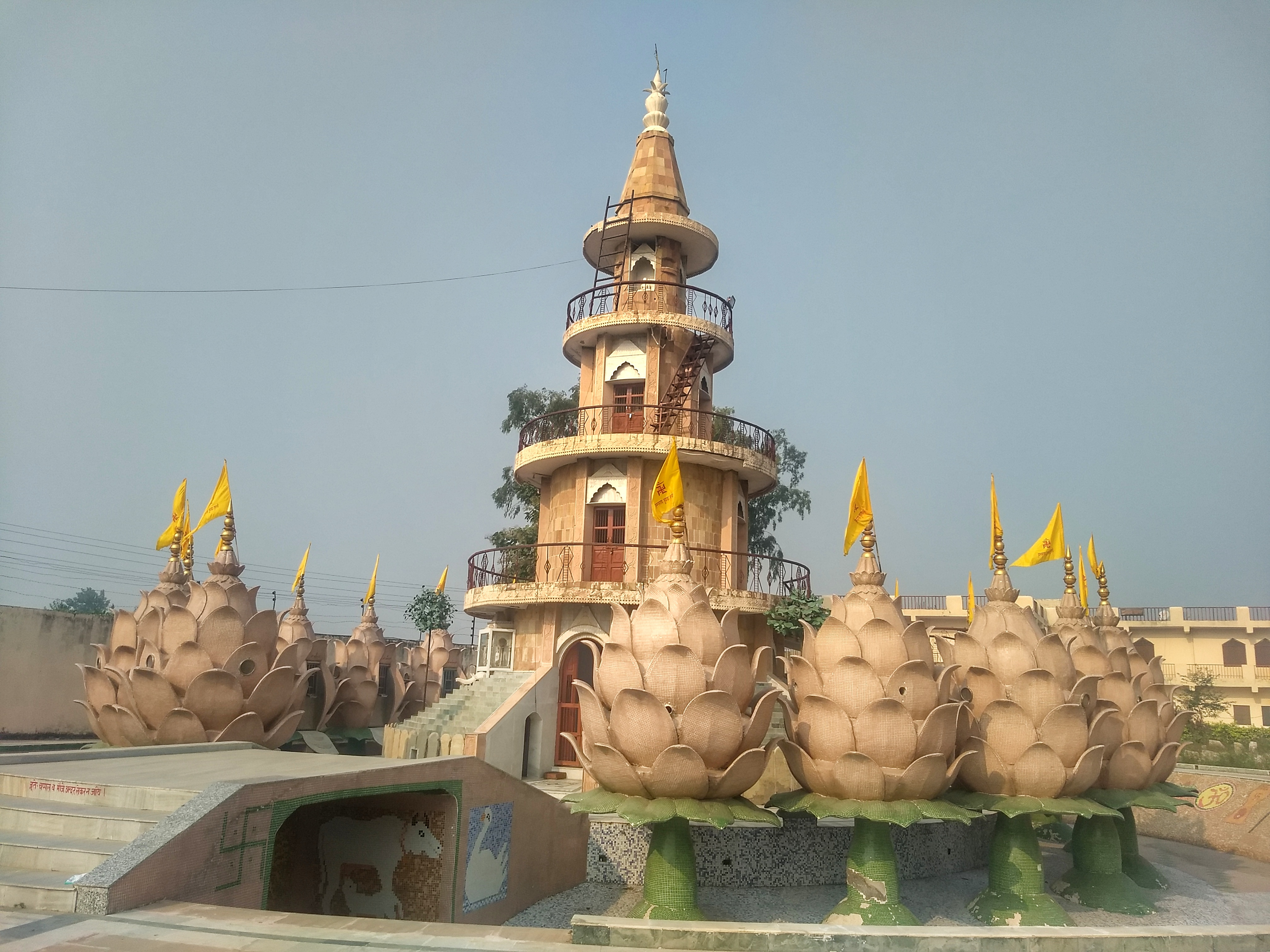
Meru temple

== See also ==
- Jambudweep
- Shri Parshwanath Atishaya Kshetra Prachin Digambar Jain Mandir
- Bada Gaon
