= Bada Gaon =

- village
- Location in Uttar Pradesh, India Bada Gaon (India)
- Coordinates: 28°52′20″N 77°20′00″E
- Country: India
- State: Uttar Pradesh
- District: Bagpat

Languages
  - Official: Hindi
- Time zone: UTC+5:30 (IST)
- PIN: 250101
- Nearest city: Khekra

Rawan Urf Bada Gaon is a village near Khekra, a town in the district of Bagpat, Uttar Pradesh. It is the location of several religious Hindu and Jain shrines, including the Maa Mansa Devi Temple, the Digambar Jain Mandir, the Shri Parshwanath Atishaya Kshetra Prachin Digambar Jain Mandir, and the Trilok Teerth Dham Mandir. Its proximity to Delhi has made it a prominent religious site. It is roughly about 29 km from Dilshad Garden (East Delhi) and one can go from either State Highway 57 or Loni-Bhopura Road.

== Jain temples ==
=== Shri Parshwanath Atishaya Kshetra Prachin Digambar Jain Mandir ===
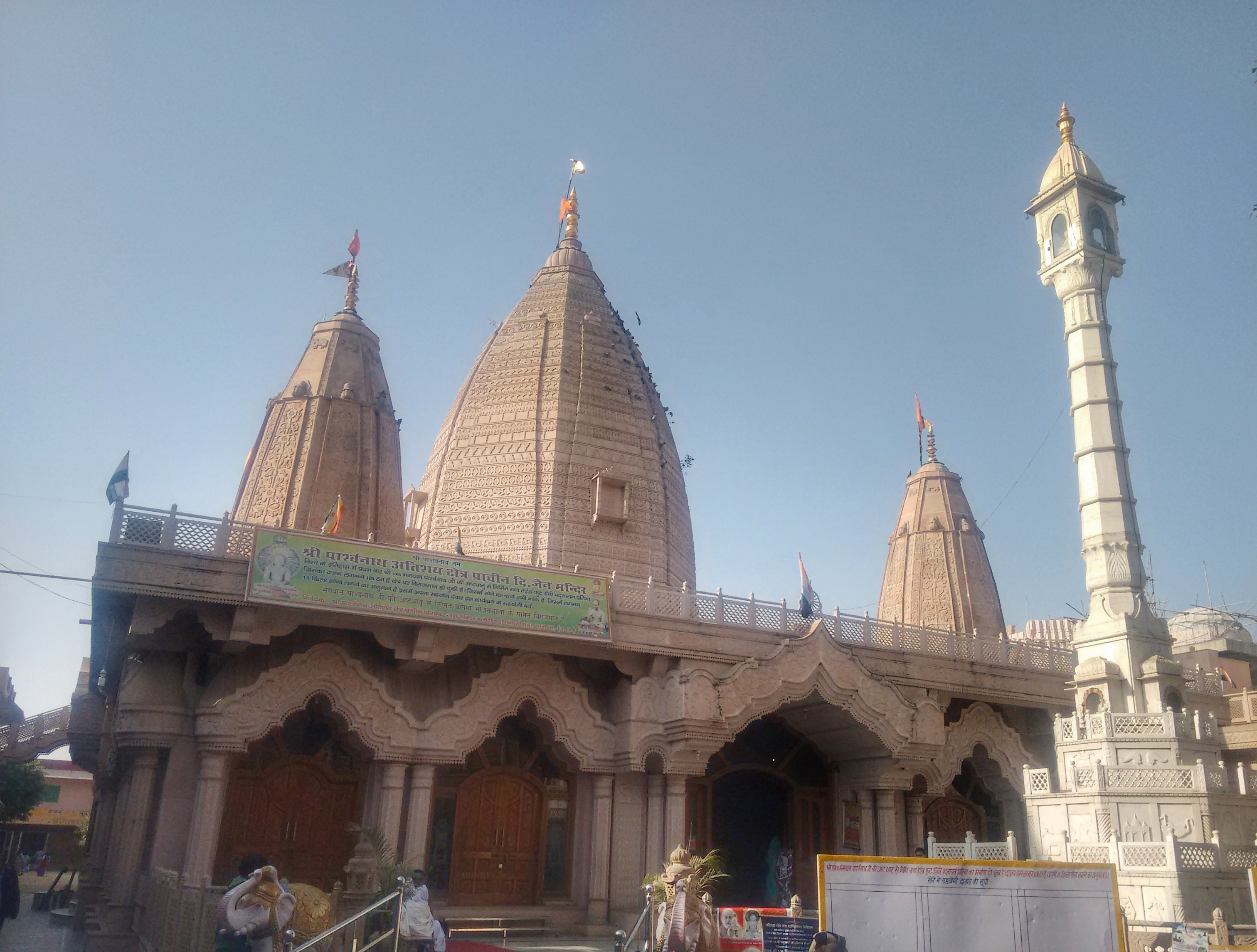
Shri Parshwanath temple

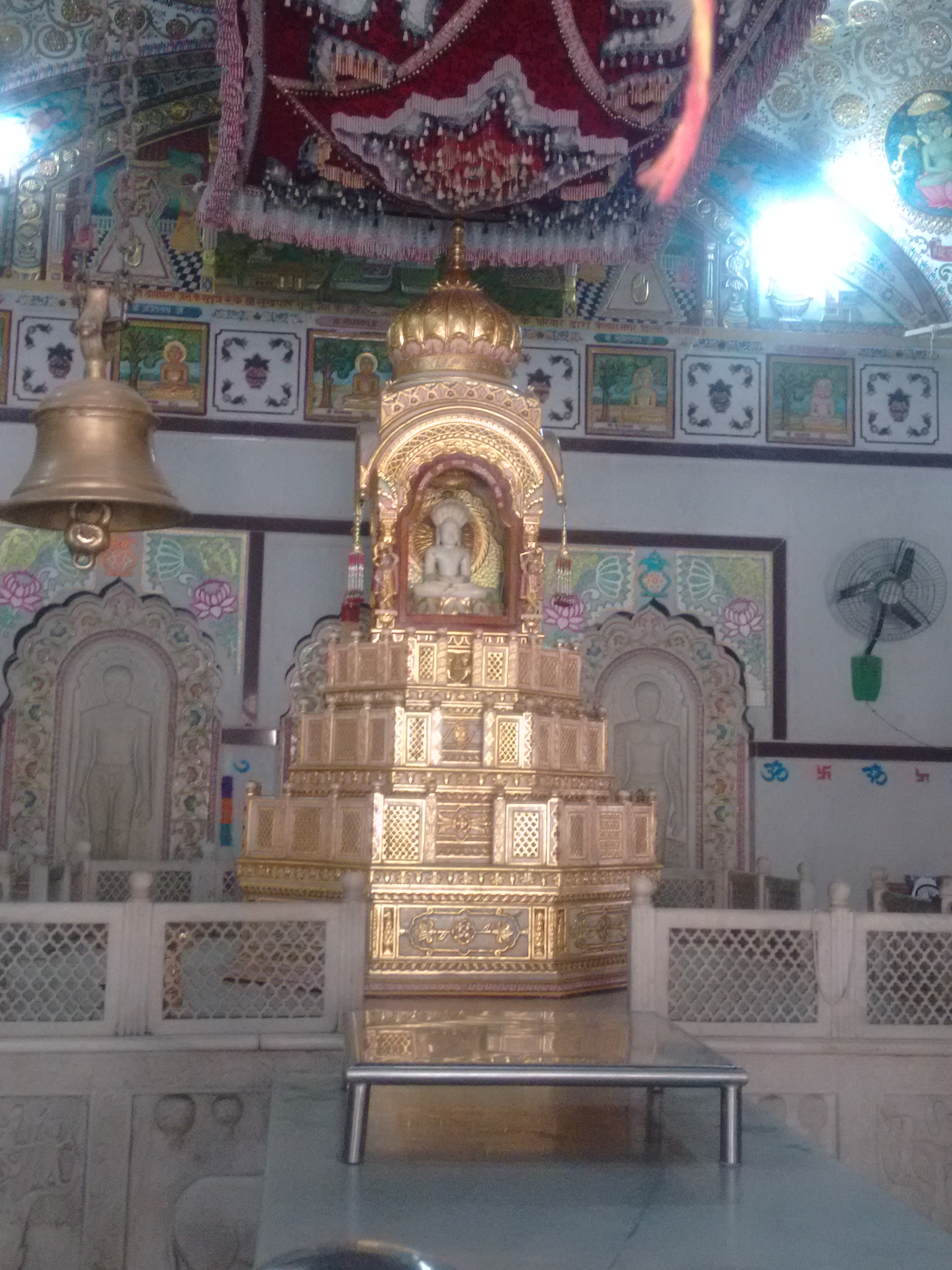
Idol of Lord Parshvanath at Bada Gaon, Khekada, Baghpat, Uttar Pradesh, India

This centuries old temple is dedicated to Parshvanatha, the 23rd tirthankar. Moolnayak of this temple is a white marble idol of Parshvanatha which was recovered from a well inside the temple. The idol is considered miraculous as well as water of the well is believed to have curative powers. Apart from the main idol, several other idols were also discovered during excavation which have also been installed in separate altars.

=== Trilok Teerth Dham ===
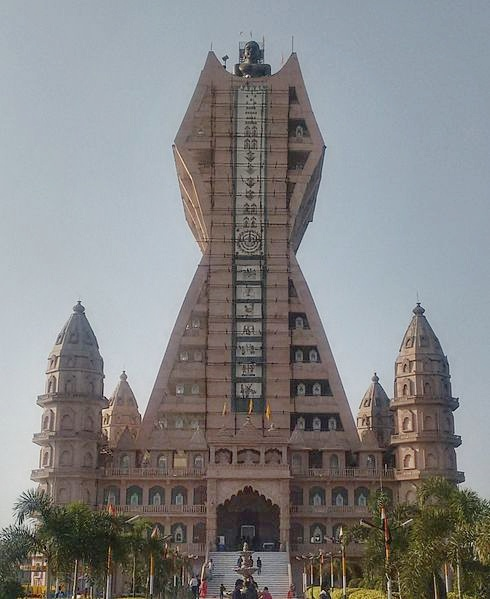
Trilok Teerth Dham

Trilok Teerth Dham is built in shape of Jain Emblem. This temple is 317 feet in height out of which 100 feet is below the ground and 217 feet above the ground. On top of the temple there is a 31 feet tall statue of Rishabhdev made up of Ashtadhatu (8 metals) in padmasan posture. This temple is dedicated to Parshvantha. This temple also has a 108 feet Manasthamb (tower of pride). The main idol was found in 1922 when Jain saint anant kirti maharaj predicted that the idol was in the hill. As the name is pronounced trilok teerth will have full depiction of three lokas i.e. Adharvlok Madhyalok & Urdhavlok. This temple includes a meditation center, Samavasarana, Nandishwar Dweep, Trikaal Chaubisi, Meru Temple, Lotus Temple, Parshvanath temple, Jambudweep. Temple also has a dharamshala equipped with all modern facilities. The Trilok teerth was constructed by Aacharya Shri Vidyabhushan Sanmati Sagar Ji Maharaja.
