= Ashtadhatu =

Alloy of eight metals in Hindu and Jain iconography

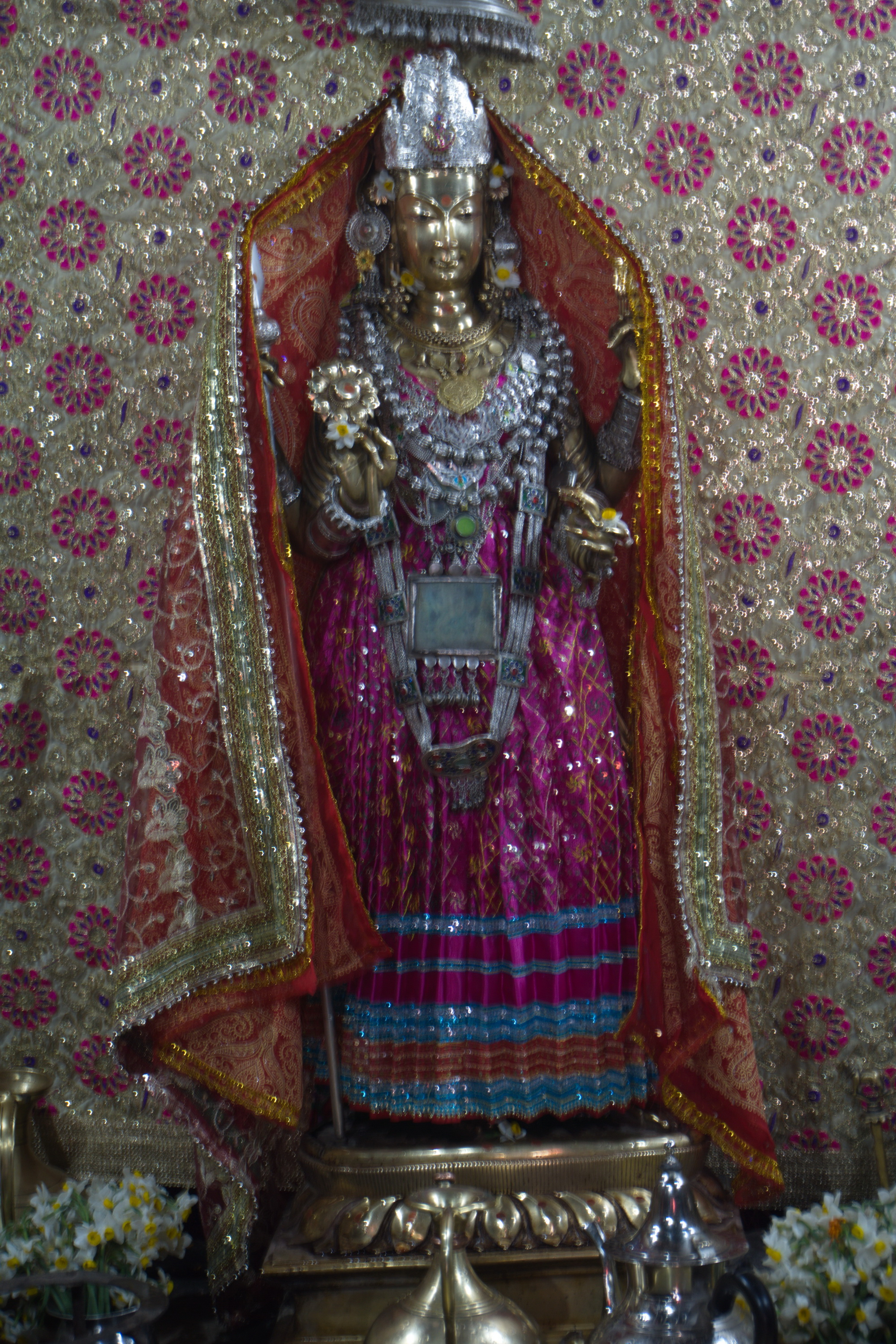
An ashtadhatu image of Parvati of the 8th century, Himachal Pradesh

Ashtadhatu (Sanskrit: अष्टधातु, romanized: Aṣṭadhātu, lit. 'eight metals'), also called octo-alloy, is an alloy comprising the eight metals of gold, silver, copper, lead, zinc, tin, iron, and mercury, often used for casting metallic idols for Jain and Hindu temples in India.

The composition is laid down in the Shilpa Shastras, a collection of ancient texts that describe arts, crafts, and their design rules, principles and standards. Ashtadhatu is used because it is considered sattivik (virtuous or pure) in Hinduism, and does not decay, and it is also restricted to the production of images for the deities Kubera, Vishnu, Krishna, Rama, Kartikeya, and the goddesses Durga and Lakshmi.

In its traditional composition, all eight metals are in equal proportion (12.5% each).

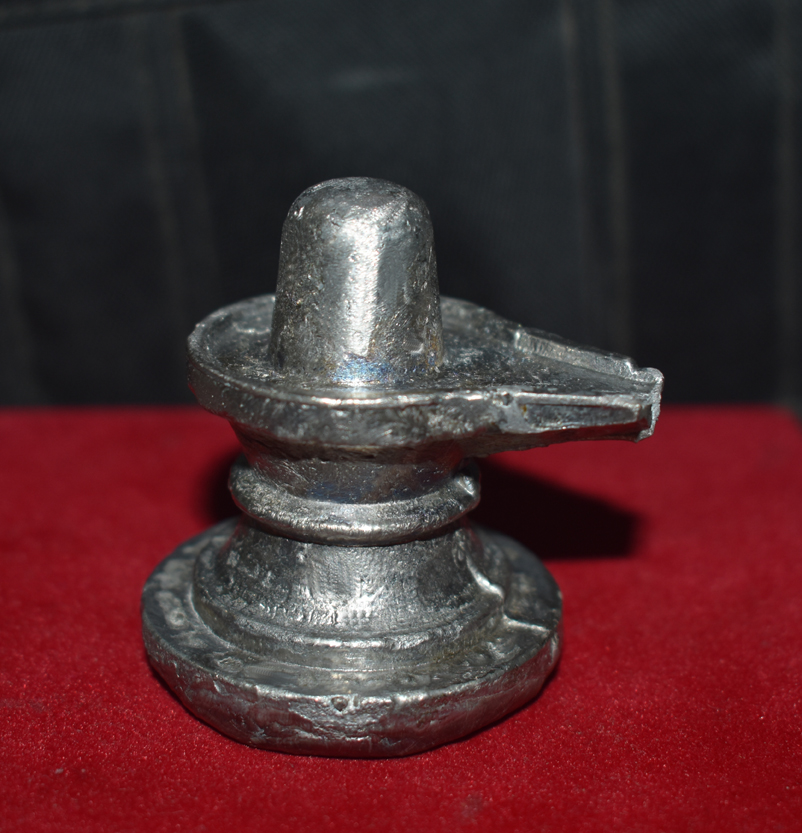
An ashtadhatu Shivalinga made by the Dhumra Gems company. It consists of all eight metals in equal proportion: gold, silver, copper, mercury, iron, lead, zinc, and tin.

== See also ==
- Panchaloha – Term for traditional five-metal alloys used for Hindu artifacts
- High-entropy alloys – Alloys with high proportions of several metals
