= Ghaziabad Lok Sabha constituency =

Constituency of the Indian parliament in Uttar Pradesh

Coordinates: 28.66°N 77.45°E

Ghaziabad UP-12
- Lok Sabha constituency
- Interactive Map Outlining Ghaziabad Lok Sabha constituency

Constituency details
- Country: India
- Region: North India
- State: Uttar Pradesh
- Assembly constituencies: Loni; Muradnagar; Sahibabad; Ghaziabad; Dholana
- Established: 2008
- Total electors: 29,45,573
- Reservation: None

Member of Parliament
- 18th Lok Sabha
- Incumbent Atul Garg
- Party: BJP
- Alliance: NDA
- Elected year: 2024

Ghaziabad Lok Sabha constituency (Hindustani: [ɣaːziːaːbaːd̪]) is one of the 80 Lok Sabha constituencies in Uttar Pradesh state in northern India. This constituency came into existence in 2008 as a part of the implementation of delimitation of parliamentary constituencies based on the recommendations of the Delimitation Commission of India constituted in 2002.

== Assembly segments ==
Presently, Ghaziabad Lok Sabha constituency comprises five Vidhan Sabha (legislative assembly) segments. Loni, Muradnagar, Sahibabad & Ghaziabad fall under Ghaziabad district, whereas Dholana falls under Hapur district.

No	Name	District	Member	Party	2024 Lead
53	Loni	Ghaziabad	Nand Kishor Gurjar	BJP	BJP
54	Muradnagar	Ghaziabad	Ajit Pal Tyagi	BJP	BJP
55	Sahibabad	Ghaziabad	Sunil Kumar Sharma	BJP	BJP
56	Ghaziabad	Ghaziabad	Sanjeev Sharma	BJP	BJP
58	Dholana	Hapur	Dharmesh Singh Tomar	BJP	INC

== Members of Parliament ==
Year	Member	Party
Till 2008 :See Hapur Lok Sabha constituency
2009	Rajnath Singh	Bharatiya Janata Party
2014	Vijay Kumar Singh	Bharatiya Janata Party
2019	Vijay Kumar Singh	Bharatiya Janata Party
2024	Atul Garg	Bharatiya Janata Party

== Election results ==
=== General Election 2024 ===
2024 Indian general elections: Ghaziabad
Party	Candidate	Votes	%	±%
BJP	Atul Garg	854,170	58.09	▼3.84
INC	Dolly Sharma	517,205	35.17	▲27.83
BSP	Nand Kishor Pundir	79,525	5.41	▼7.48
NOTA	None of the Above	8,211	0.56	▲0.07
Majority		336,965	22.91	▼9.99
Turnout		1,470,430	49.92	▼5.97
BJP hold		Swing		

=== 2019 ===
2019 Indian general elections: Ghaziabad
Party	Candidate	Votes	%	±%
BJP	General Vijay Kumar Singh	944,503	61.93	+5.45
SP	Suresh Bansal	4,43,003	29.06	+21.09
INC	Dolly Sharma	1,11,944	7.34	−6.91
NOTA	None of the Above	7,495	0.49	+0.03
Majority		5,01,500	32.90	−9.36
Turnout		15,25,097	55.89	−1.05
BJP hold		Swing	-7.82	

=== 2014 ===
2014 Indian general elections: Ghaziabad
Party	Candidate	Votes	%	±%
BJP	General Vijay Kumar Singh	758,482	56.51	+13.17
INC	Raj Babbar	1,91,222	14.25	−18.16
BSP	Mukul Upadhyay	1,73,085	12.89	−8.84
SP	Sudhan Kumar	1,06,984	7.97	N/A
AAP	Shazia Ilmi Malik	89,147	6.64	N/A
NOTA	None of the Above	6,205	0.46	N/A
Majority		5,67,260	42.26	+31.33
Turnout		13,42,471	56.94	+11.64
BJP hold		Swing	+15.67	

=== 2009 ===
2009 Indian general elections: Ghaziabad
Party	Candidate	Votes	%	±%
BJP	Rajnath Singh	359,637	43.34	
INC	Surendra Prakash Goel	268,956	32.41	
BSP	Pt. Amar Pal Sharma	180,285	21.73	
Majority		90,681	10.93	
Turnout		829,823	45.30	
BJP win (new seat)				

== See also ==
- Hapur Lok Sabha constituency
- Ghaziabad district
- List of constituencies of the Lok Sabha
