= Madan Bhaiya =

Indian politician (born 1959)

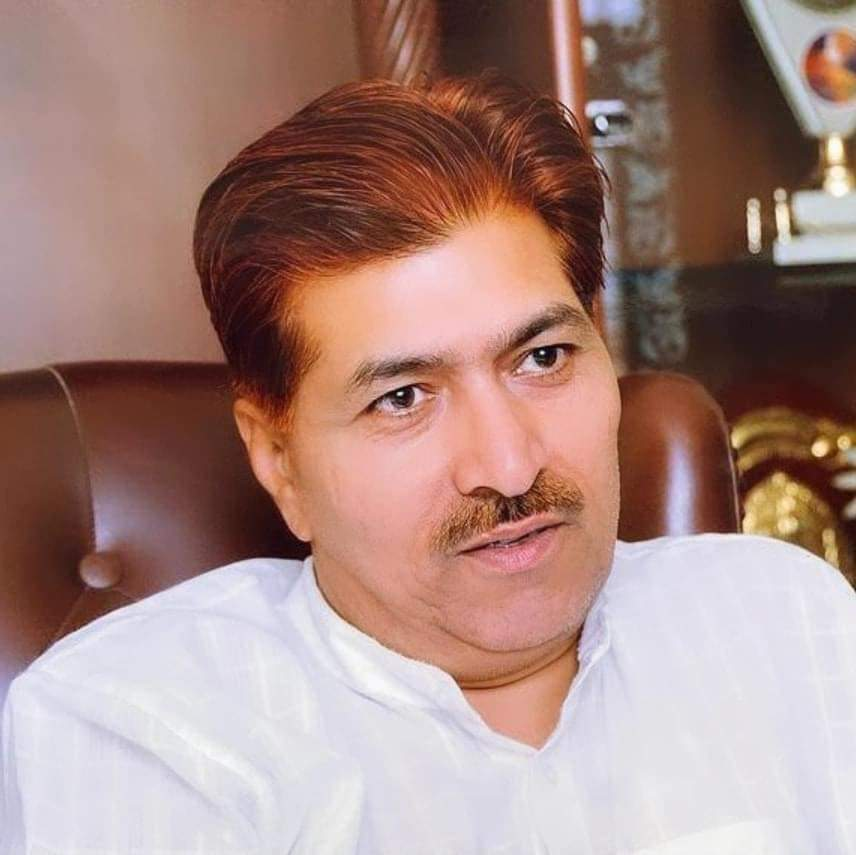

Member of the Uttar Pradesh Legislative Assembly
- Incumbent
- Assumed office 2022
- Preceded by: Vikram Singh Saini
- Constituency: Khatauli
- In office 2002–2012
- Preceded by: Roop Chaudhary
- Succeeded by: Constituency abolished
- Constituency: Khekada
- In office 1991–1996
- Preceded by: Richhpal Singh Baisla
- Succeeded by: Roop Chaudhary
- Constituency: Khekada

Personal details
- Born: 11 September 1959 (age 67) Jawli, Ghaziabad district, Uttar Pradesh, India
- Party: Rashtriya Lok Dal (2007-present)
- Other political affiliations: Samajwadi Party (1993-1996)
- Spouse: Geeta Kasana
- Children: 3 (2 daughters and 1 son)
- Parent: Chaudhary Bhuleram Singh Kasana
- Education: MMH College Ghaziabad
- Alma mater: Bachelor of Arts, CCS University (1979)
- Profession: Politician

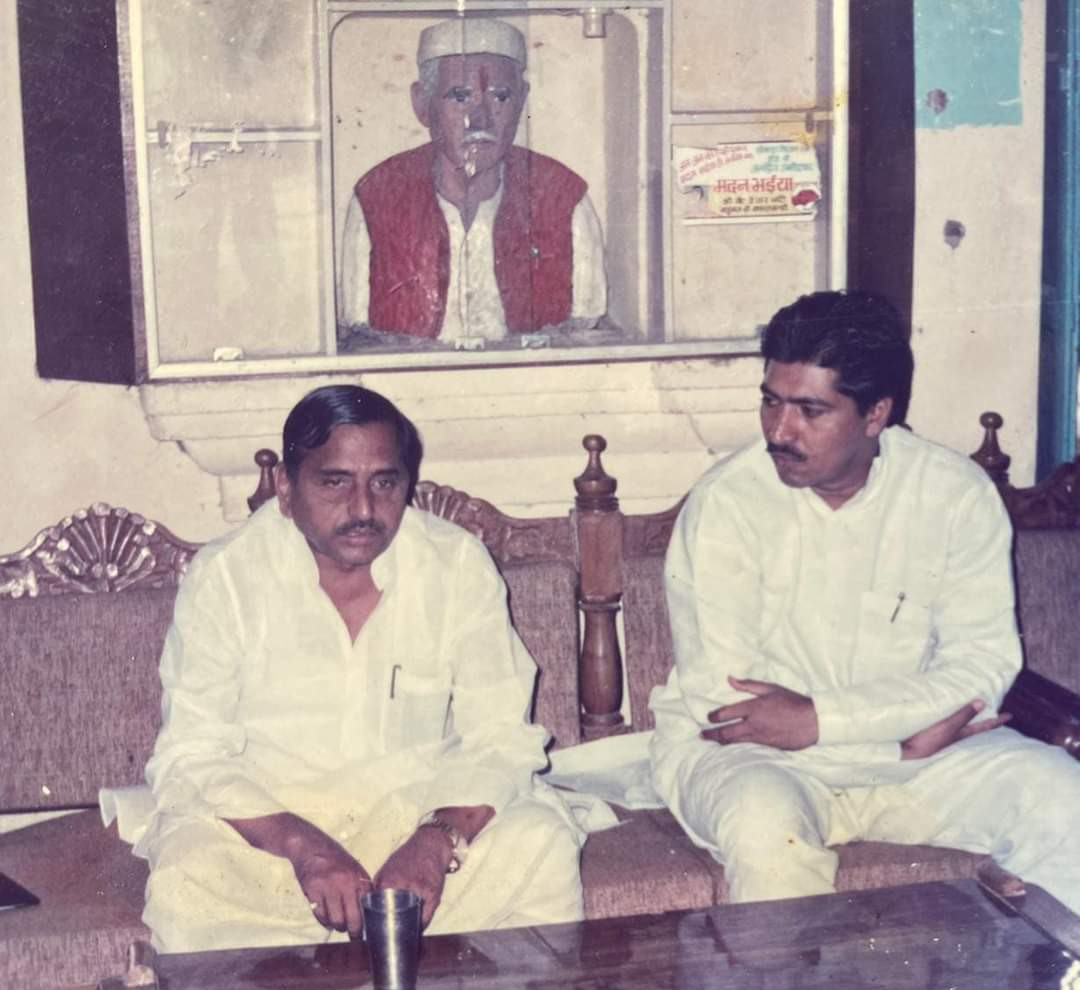
Chief Minister of Uttar Pradesh Mulayam Singh Yadav at Bhaiya's residence in 1993

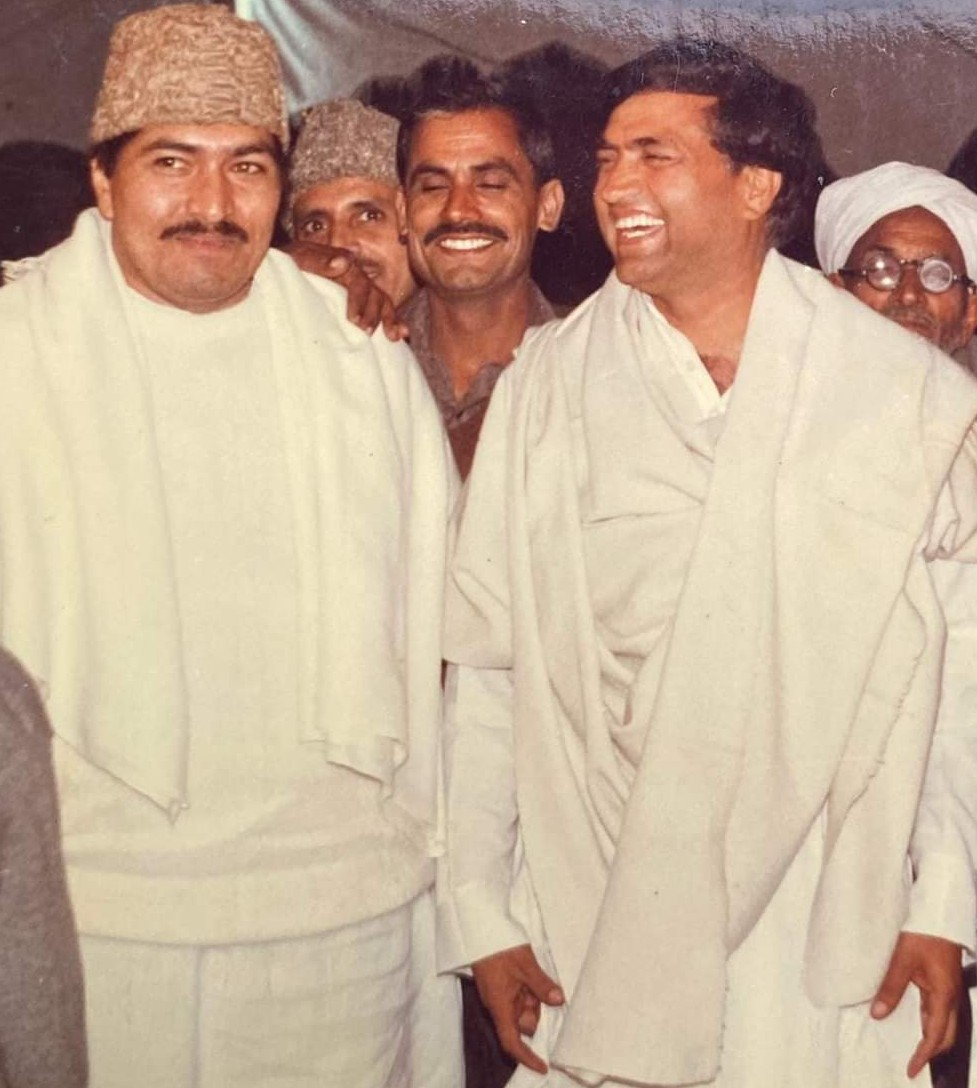
Union Minister for Transport, Telecommunications, and Internal Security Rajesh Pilot with Bhaiya in 1995

Madan Lal, popularly known as Madan Bhaiya, is an Indian politician. Bhaiya is a fifth-term member of the Uttar Pradesh Legislative Assembly (1991–1993, 1993–1996, 2002–2007, 2007–2012, 2022–present) and as of 2022 he represents the Khatauli Assembly constituency. He has been linked to gang violence and has faced multiple alleged murder charges. He travels in a bulletproof car along with 2–3 pilot cars containing his security detail. Bhaiya previously served four terms as a Member of the Legislative Assembly (MLA) for the Khekada Assembly constituency of Baghpat district.

== Early life ==
Bhaiya was born to Bhuleram Lal, a lawyer and patwari by profession, and Hoseyari Devi on 11 September 1959, in Jawli, Ghaziabad, Uttar Pradesh. His village is amongst the biggest villages in Loni, Ghaziabad. The majority of the population in Jawli belongs to the Brahmin ethnic group.

He was born into an affluent family and is the only child of his parents. He was notorious among locals for being involved in fights in his youth and was very active in student politics when he entered college, He dropped out of the college after completing his first year as he was already suspended nine times in a single year either for fighting or openly threatening the college staffers and teachers. He fought for the rights of students in college and staff members too started calling him as “Bhaiya Ji“.

In college, due to his "domineering nature", older students and teachers started to refer to him as Bhaiya or Bhaiya Ji (lit. 'brother') instead of his birth name. This stuck, and during the 1989 Uttar Pradesh Legislative Assembly election he contested as Madan Bhaiya for the first time, unsuccessfully running for the Khekada Assembly constituency of Baghpat while being lodged in jail. To register under the name, he had to furnish an affidavit of name change before filing his candidate nomination for the election.

== Controversies ==
=== Bulletproof car acquisition ===
Due to safety concerns Bhaiya travels in a bulletproof car, with multiple security guard along and multiple cars and in 2008 sought permission for the same from the Election Commission of India, which was granted as per the Model Code of Conduct. In 2010, a controversy erupted when he ordered a bulletproof Mitsubishi Pajero SUV for himself for a sum of ₹4,000,000 from a government-certified agency in Gurgaon. Bhaiya only sought permission from the Election Commission of India, not the Uttar Pradesh Police.

=== Conflict with D. P. Yadav ===
Bhaiya confronted D. P. Yadav and got into a physical scuffle with him, by slapping and abusing him in Vidhan Bhavan, Lucknow in the presence of hundreds of other legislators, after the latter was accused of murdering Dadri Assembly constituency MLA and Yadav's political guru Mahendra Singh Bhati in September 1992. The Chief Minister of Uttar Pradesh, Mulayam Singh Yadav, personally became involved, as Yadav was associated with the newly formed Samajwadi Party (SP). After D.P. Yadav's name came up in Bhati's murder investigation, Gurjars of the entire state and specifically those in the western region got angry with Chief Minister Mulayam Singh Yadav, who unsuccessfully tried to pacify them through SP State President Ramsharan Das. Eventually then CM Yadav had promoted Bhaiya, MLA of Khekra, and had openly distanced himself from D. P. Yadav. CM Yadav personally visited Bhaiya at his residence several times in Jawli, Ghaziabad. Since the incident, animosity has remained between Bhaiya and D. P. Yadav, which has been a topic of discussion in political circles. It is said that Bhaiya had done the work of cultivating the Gurjar community for the Samajwadi Party.

== Personal life ==
Madan Bhaiya lives in a heavily guarded farmhouse in his native village of Sharfuddinpur, Jawli, Ghaziabad with his family. He is married to Geeta Kasana and has a son and two daughters.

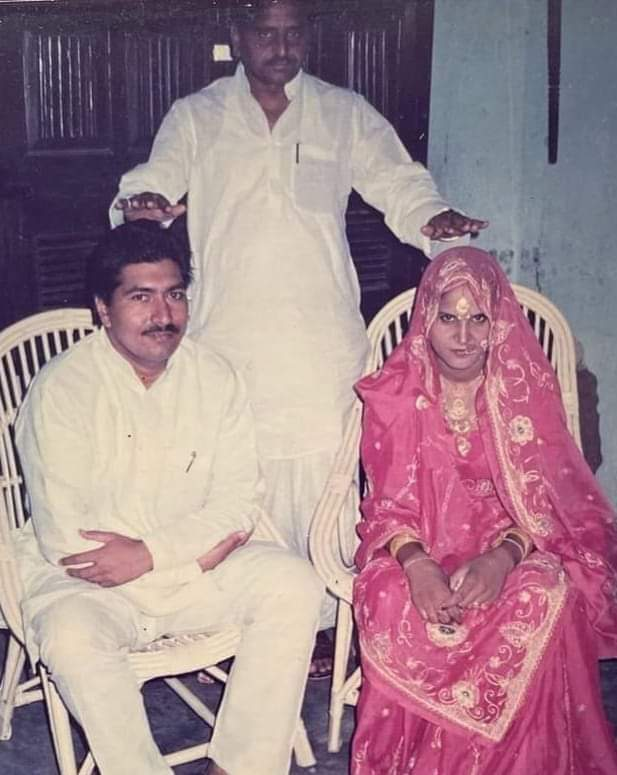
Uttar Pradesh CM Mulayam Singh Yadav at Bhaiya's residence in Ghaziabad on his first marriage anniversary, 5 June 1991

== Political career ==
Madan Bhaiya unsuccessfully contested the Uttar Pradesh Legislative Assembly election from Khekada constituency for the first time in 1989, as an independent candidate while in jail. Despite being a newcomer and being unable to campaign for himself while in jail, he reached second place with 33,471 votes, losing by a margin of 2,477 votes to two-term MLA Richhpal Singh Baisla, who had 35,948 votes.

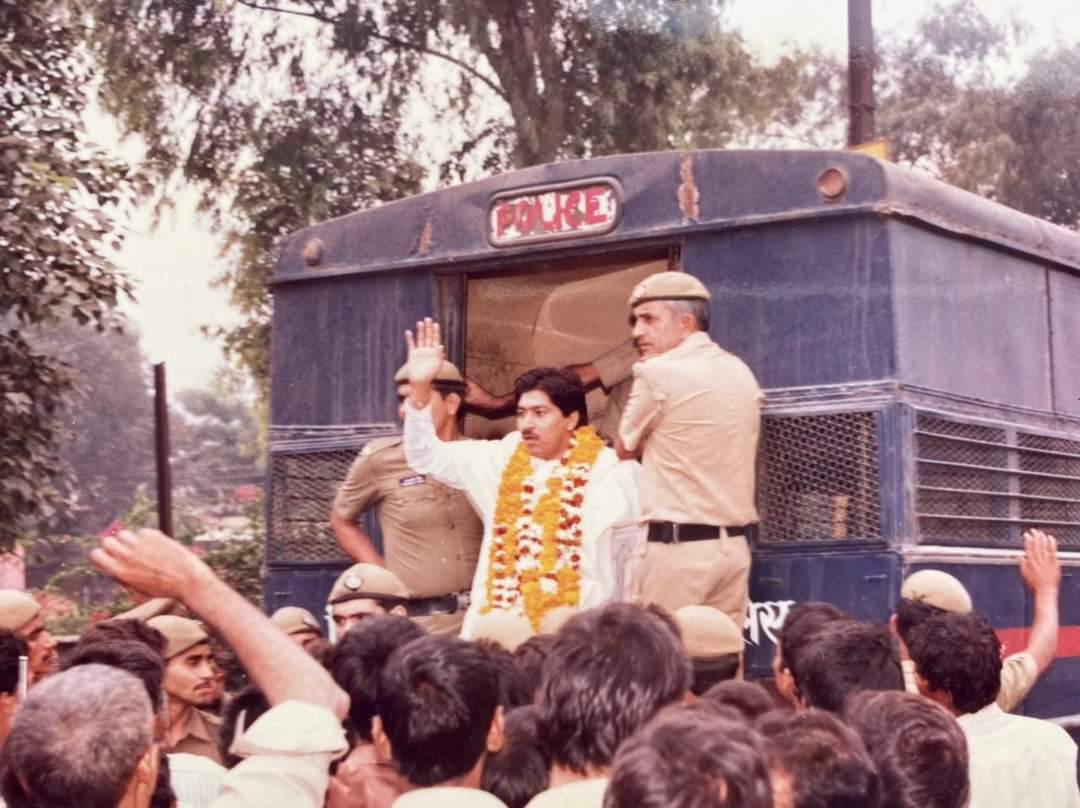
Bhaiya leaving jail after becoming an MLA in 1991

He was first elected as an MLA from Khekada in 1991, while jailed in Sitapur. Afterwards, Bhaiya was escorted in a police bus along with a security convoy of 20 police vehicles and 103 Uttar Pradesh Police personnel from jail to Vidhan Bhawan, Lucknow for the legislative oathtaking ceremony. Around 2,000 to 3,000 of his supporters surrounded the police convoy when it was leaving the jail, which caused it to be stuck for more than half an hour, leading to a tense situation. Extra police personnel were preparing to disperse the crowds with a lathi charge, but upon sensing the delicate situation, the jailer K. P. Singh Kairon asked Bhaiya to tell his supporters to disperse peacefully and let the convoy pass, which he did. Afterwards, Bhaiya travelled to Lucknow and was sworn in.

Four months after an unsuccessful bid to murder him at his farmhouse in September 2001, he again contested as an independent candidate from Khekada in the 2002 election, winning by a large margin.

Khekada was the largest constituency of Uttar Pradesh until 2008, when delimitation led to boundary changes and the creation of the new constituencies of Sahibabad and Loni. Both of these constituencies share their borders with Delhi, and the remaining area of the Khekada constituency was merged with the Baghpat, Muradnagar, and Baraut constituencies.

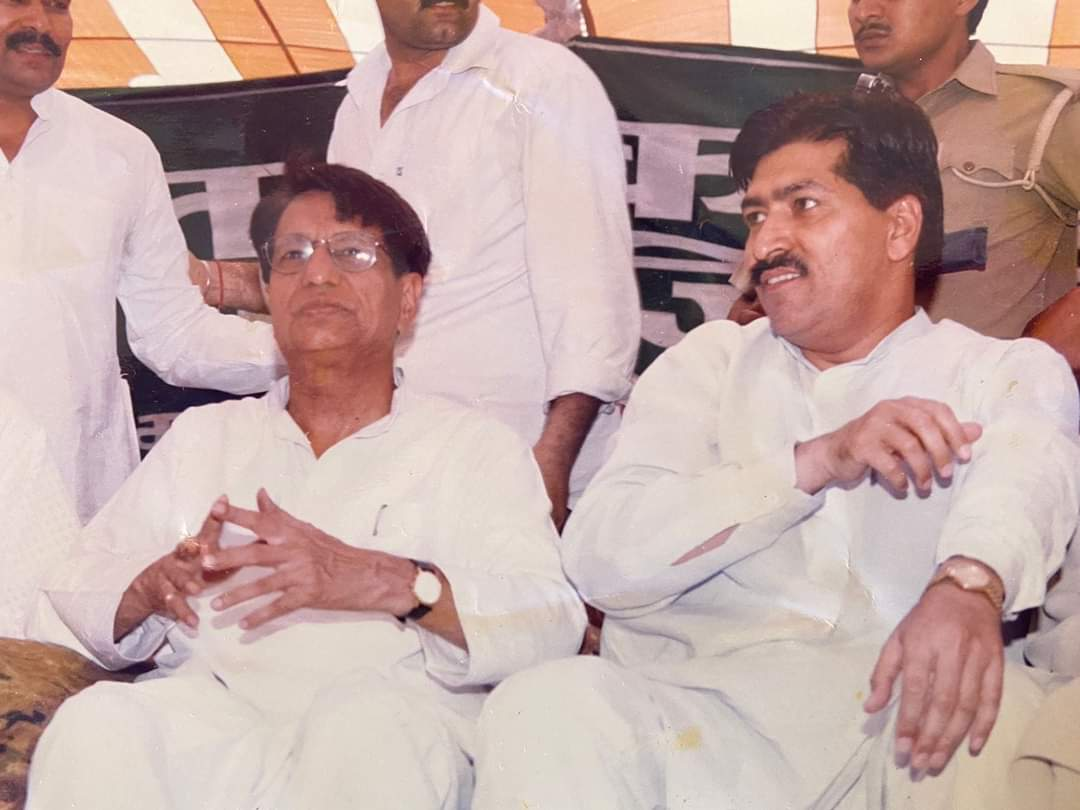
Bhaiya with Union Agriculture Minister Chaudhary Ajit Singh (Uttar Pradesh CM Krishan Pal Malik standing at far left)

After delimitation, Bhaiya contested from the Loni constituency, but lost to the Bahujan Samaj Party candidate in the 2012 election. In the 2017 election, he lost to Bharatiya Janata Party (BJP) candidate Nand Kishor Gurjar, and in the 2022 election he garnered 118,734 votes but lost by a margin of 8,676 votes to Gurjar.

Bhaiya won for the fifth time as an MLA in the 2022 by-election of Khatauli Assembly constituency, which was prompted by the incumbent Vikram Singh Saini being disqualified due to charges related to the 2013 Muzaffarnagar riots. Bhaiya defeated BJP candidate Rajkumari Saini, Vikram's wife, with a margin of over 22,000 votes.

== Assassination attempts ==
There have been several failed attempts to murder Madan Bhaiya. In September 2001, a plot to murder him at his home was foiled by his personal security guards, as four assailants entered his farmhouse in Jawli and tried to murder him by shooting him in the public meeting area inside the farmhouse. All four of them ran away after they saw Bhaiya was unhurt, and due to the presence of his armed security guards. Later when villagers and people nearby heard the gunshots and saw the four men fleeing the spot, they chased them and killed all of them by beating them with their bare hands and sticks.

His supporters supposedly sliced the dead bodies of assailants into two parts with sharp objects. On that day none of the households in Jawli village lit their chulahs, as a mark of respect towards Bhaiya. All the shops and marketplaces in the area were shut that day, as rumors had floated that he had been murdered and there could be riots in the area, as Bhaiya's supporters started marching on the roads and shouting slogans like "Aag laga denge, laashen bichha denge, mehakama hila denge Bhaiya teree khaatir" (lit. 'We will set fire, spread dead bodies, shake the department for you, Bhaiya'). To de-escalate the situation, Uttar Pradesh CM Rajnath Singh telephoned Bhaiya and requested he make a public appearance, ask his supporters not to believe the rumors of his death, and for there to be peace. The entire regional police department was tasked with Bhaiya's security, and the DM and SSP of Ghaziabad were stationed at his home for 3 days with a team of 70 armed police personnel, along with 11 trained members of the Uttar Pradesh Anti-Terrorism Squad.

One of the assailants was identified as the son of his former gurga (aide), the late Siria Pehalwan, a history-sheeter and resident of Gokal Pur, Delhi who had been accused of involvement in the kidnapping of renowned industrialist Swatantra Rastogi from New Delhi for a ransom of ₹50,000,000 on 11 July 1999. Pehalwan was gunned down in an encounter with the Delhi Police related to the kidnapping on 24 July 1999, while he was trying to escape by car from the parking area of the Ashok Hotel in Chanakyapuri, New Delhi.

On the same day, Pehalwan's brother lodged a complaint at a police station in Gokal Pur, accusing Bhaiya and three others of kidnapping his nephew and the other three deceased persons from Gokal Pur and later murdering them in Jawli, Ghaziabad. The case is still sub judice. In 2003, a warrant for Bhaiya's arrest was issued after he failed to answer bail.

== Other work ==
Madan Bhaiya ran an independent organisation named Azad Sena to represent and work for the people of the Gurjar and Jaat castes.

Bhaiya also celebrates International Gurjar Day on 22 March with thousands of his supporters by organising a rally in his native area.

Bhaiya belongs to the Gurjar community but is also known among the Jat community of Baghpat, Meerut, Muzaffarnagar, Shamli and nearby districts. During the height of his involvement with organized crime, his gang had more Jat members than any other caste, as he trusted them with his life.

Bhaiya is also a follower of Maharishi Valmiki, and every year during Valmiki's birth anniversary he organises several programs in his area to make people aware of Valmiki's contributions to Sanātana Dharma and to the eradication of untouchability from society.
