= Hapur Lok Sabha constituency =

Former constituency of the Indian parliament in Uttar Pradesh

Coordinates: 28.7°N 77.8°E

Hapur
- Former Lok Sabha constituency

Constituency details
- Country: India
- Region: North India
- State: Uttar Pradesh
- Established: 1957
- Abolished: 2008

Hapur Lok Sabha constituency was a former parliamentary constituency in Uttar Pradesh, India. It was dissolved in 2008 when it became part of Ghaziabad Lok Sabha constituency.

As of 2024, Hapur district is part of the Meerut–Hapur Lok Sabha constituency.

== Assembly segments ==
=== 1976–2008 ===
1. Ghaziabad
2. Muradnagar
3. Modinagar
4. Hapur
5. Garhmukteshwar

== Members of Parliament ==
The following members of parliament represented Hapur Lok Sabha constituency:

| Year | Member | Party |
|---|---|---|
| 1957 | Krishna Chandra Sharma | Indian National Congress |
| 1962 | Kamla Chaudhry | Indian National Congress |
| 1967 | Prakash Vir Shastri | Independent politician |
| 1971 | Buddha Priya Maurya | Indian National Congress |
| 1977 | Kunwar Mahmood Ali Khan | Bharatiya Lok Dal |
| 1980 | Anwar Ahmad | Janata Party (Secular) |
| 1984 | Kedarnath Singh | Indian National Congress (I) |
| 1989 | Kishan Chand Tyagi | Janata Dal |
| 1991 | Dr. Ramesh Chand Tomar | Bharatiya Janata Party |
| 1996 | Dr. Ramesh Chand Tomar | Bharatiya Janata Party |
| 1998 | Dr. Ramesh Chand Tomar | Bharatiya Janata Party |
| 1999 | Dr. Ramesh Chand Tomar | Bharatiya Janata Party |
| 2004 | Surendra Prakash Goel | Indian National Congress |
2008 onwards : See Ghaziabad Lok Sabha constituency

== See also ==
- Hapur
- List of constituencies of the Lok Sabha
