= Nand Kishor Gurjar =

Indian politician

Member of the Uttar Pradesh Legislative Assembly
- Incumbent
- Assumed office 19 March 2017
- Preceded by: Zakir Ali
- Constituency: Loni

Personal details
- Born: 2 March 1975 (age 51) Ganoli, Ghaziabad district, Uttar Pradesh
- Party: Bharatiya Janata Party (since 2010)
- Other political affiliations: Samajwadi Party
- Spouse: Vinay Gurjar (m. 1996)
- Children: Naresh Gurjar, Lalit Gurjar
- Occupation: Politician

Nand Kishor Gurjar is an Indian politician. He is Member of the Legislative Assembly from Loni (Assembly constituency) of Ghaziabad, Uttar Pradesh since 2017. In the 2017 election he defeated Bahujan Samaj Party candidate Zakir Ali and Rashtriya Lok Dal candidate Madan Bhaiya.

== Personal life ==
Nand Kishor Gurjar was born on 2 March 1975 in Ganoli, Ghaziabad district, Uttar Pradesh, the son of Baleshwar Gurjar. Gurjar married his wife, Vinay Gurjar, on 1 May 1996. He has two sons with her, Naresh Gurjar and Lalit Gurjar.

He completed a master's degree in mechanical engineering at Shambhu Dayal P.G. College Ghaziabad in 2005 and his LL.B (Bachelor of Laws) degree at the Chaudhary Charan Singh University (formerly known as Meerut University) in 2010.

== Political career ==
Gurjar became involved in politics in the late 1990s during his time as the student union president of Shambhu Dayal P.G. College Ghaziabad, when he joined the Samajwadi Party. After he graduated from Shambhu Dayal P.G. College in 2005, he founded the AJGAR Sena, which references Chhotu Ram's and Chaudhary Charan Singh's idea of AJGAR while also meaning "Python Army" in Hindi. The AJGAR Sena has been described by ThePrint as an outfit for the Ahirs, Jats, Gurjars, and Rajputs, with the goal of uniting the OBC communities of Western Uttar Pradesh. Gurjar later stated in 2025 that he decided to found the AJGAR Sena to protect "cows and girls from Muslims". Gurjar joined the Bharatiya Janata Party (BJP) in 2010 after meeting with Rajnath Singh, who at the time was the MP of the Ghaziabad Lok Sabha constituency. That same year, Gurjar would begin organizing the nine-day long Ram Katha in Loni every year, and continued to do so from 2010 onwards. He attempted to secure the BJP ticket for the 2012 Uttar Pradesh Legislative Assembly election, but failed to do so. From 2012 to 2017 he focused on managing the operations of the AJGAR Sena.

Gurjar secured the BJP ticket in the next election thanks to intervention of Deputy Chief Minister of Uttar Pradesh Keshav Prasad Maurya, and was successfully elected MLA of the Loni Assembly constituency in the 2017 Uttar Pradesh Legislative Assembly election, defeating his opponents Madan Bhaiya of the Rashtriya Lok Dal and the incumbent Zakir Ali of the Bahujan Samaj Party. During the pandemic, In 2022, Gurjar was reelected MLA of Loni. By 2025, Gurjar's AJGAR Sena had seen a decrease in activity, now existing only on paper for the most part.
