= Ramesh Chand Tomar =

Indian politician (born 1948)

Member of Parliament, Lok Sabha
- In office 1991–2004
- Preceded by: K. C. Tyagi
- Succeeded by: Surendra Prakash Goel
- Constituency: Hapur

Personal details
- Born: 15 July 1948 (age 78) Agwar, Agra district
- Party: Bharatiya Janata Party
- Spouse: Madhu Ranjana Tomar (m. 1974)
- Parents: Kamal Singh Tomar (father); Lila Wati (mother)
- Education: Master of Science; Doctor of Philosophy
- Alma mater: Agra College; Delhi University

Ramesh Chand Singh Tomar (born 15 July 1948) is an Indian politician. He was a member of the 10th, 11th, 12th and 13th Lok Sabha as BJP representative from Ghaziabad seat of Uttar Pradesh.

He lost from Dholana constituency in the 2017 Uttar Pradesh Assembly election to Aaslam Choudhary of the Bahujan Samaj Party.
