= Shahpur Bamheta =

Village in India

Shahpur Bamheta is a village in erstwhile Ghaziabad district, Uttar Pradesh, India. Adjacent to Delhi-Meerut Expressway & N.H. 91 (G.T Road). It is located 6.8 kilometres (4.2 mi) away from Ghaziabad Railway Station towards N.H. 91. It is dominated by the people of Hindu Yadav community. During the medieval period, under Yadav rulers and Jagdish phelwan, Bamheta had around 52,000 Bighas of land.

There is a post office of India Post located in the village and Shahpur Bamheta, pin code is 201002. The post office name is Shahpur Bamheta Branch Post Office and post office type is branch office.

Ajit Pal is currently Member of Legislative Assembly (MLA) Muradnagar and Atul Garg is currently Member of Parliament (MP) from Ghaziabad.

== Geography ==
Shahpur Bamheta is located at 28.6462° N, 77.4745° E. It has an average elevation of 213 metres (699 ft).

== Transport ==
Shahpur Bamheta is well connected with N.H. 24 & N.H. 91. Nearest Railway station is Ghaziabad railway station which is 6.8 km away.
