= Sahibabad Assembly constituency =

Constituency of the Uttar Pradesh legislative assembly in India

Sahibabad
- Constituency No. 55 for the Uttar Pradesh Legislative Assembly

Constituency details
- Country: India
- Region: North India
- State: Uttar Pradesh
- District: Ghaziabad
- Total electors: 10,21,035 (2022)
- Reservation: None

Member of Legislative Assembly
- 18th Uttar Pradesh Legislative Assembly
- Incumbent Sunil Kumar Sharma
- Party: Bharatiya Janata Party
- Elected year: 2022

Sahibabad Assembly constituency is one of the 403 constituencies of the Uttar Pradesh Legislative Assembly, India. It is a part of the Ghaziabad district and one of the five assembly constituencies in the Ghaziabad Lok Sabha constituency. The first election in this assembly constituency was held in 2012 after the "Delimitation of Parliamentary and Assembly Constituencies Order, 2008" was passed, and the constituency was constituted in 2008. The constituency is assigned identification number 55.

== Wards / Areas ==
Extent of Sahibabad Assembly constituency is PC Arthala, Makanpur of Loni KC, Ward Nos. 1, 8, 9, 13, 14, 16, 18, 19, 20, 25, 26, 30, 33, 38, 41, 50, 55 & 60 in Ghaziabad (M Corp.) of Ghaziabad Tehsil.

== Members of the Legislative Assembly ==
Year	Member	Party
Till 2012 : Constituency did not exist
2012	Amarpal Sharma	Bahujan Samaj Party
2017	Sunil Kumar Sharma	Bharatiya Janata Party
2022	Sunil Kumar Sharma	Bharatiya Janata Party

== Election results ==
=== 2027 ===
2027 Uttar Pradesh Legislative Assembly election: Sahibabad
Party	Candidate	Votes	%	±%
INDIA				
NDA				
BSP				
NOTA	None of the above			
Majority				
Turnout				
gain from		Swing		

=== 2022 ===
2022 Uttar Pradesh Legislative Assembly election: Sahibabad
Party	Candidate	Votes	%	±%
BJP	Sunil Kumar Sharma	322,882	67.03	+5.33
SP	Amarpal Sharma	108,047	22.43	
BSP	Ajit Kumar Pal	24,136	5.01	−4.77
INC	Sangeeta Tyagi	10,273	2.13	−24.18
AAP	Dr. Chhavi Yadav	6,965	1.45	
NOTA	None of the above	2,945	0.61	−0.11
Majority		214,835	44.6	+9.21
Turnout		481,686	47.18	−2.02
BJP hold		Swing		

=== 2017 ===
U. P. Legislative Assembly Election, 2017: Sahibabad
Party	Candidate	Votes	%	±%
BJP	Sunil Kumar Sharma	262,741	61.7	
INC	Amarpal Sharma	112,056	26.31	
BSP	Jalaluddin	41,654	9.78	
NOTA	None of the above	3,057	0.72	
Majority		150,685	35.39	
Turnout		425,868	49.2	
BJP gain from BSP		Swing		

=== 2012 ===
U. P. Legislative Assembly Election, 2012: Sahibabad
Party	Candidate	Votes	%	±%
BSP	Amarpal Sharma	124,332	37.26	
BJP	Sunil Kumar Sharma	99,984	29.97	
INC	Satish Chandra Tyagi	51,195	15.34	
SP	Prahlad Sharma	36,266	10.87	
Independent	Harprasad Gupta	5,195	1.56	
Independent	Tejpal Singh	4,385	1.31	
Majority		24,348	6.29	
Turnout		333,656	49.31	
BSP win (new seat)				

== See also ==
- Ghaziabad district, India
- Ghaziabad Lok Sabha constituency
- Sixteenth Legislative Assembly of Uttar Pradesh
- Uttar Pradesh Legislative Assembly
