= Sanjeev Sharma (politician) =

Indian politician

Member of the Uttar Pradesh Legislative Assembly
- Incumbent
- Assumed office 23 November 2024
- Preceded by: Atul Garg
- Constituency: Ghaziabad

Personal details
- Political party: Bharatiya Janata Party
- Profession: Politician

Sanjeev Sharma is an Indian politician who has been elected as a member of Uttar Pradesh Legislative Assembly from Ghaziabad Assembly constituency since 23 November 2024 as a member of Bharatiya Janata Party.
