= Kamla Chaudhry =

Indian writer and member of parliament (1908–1970)

- Born: 22 February 1908; Lucknow
- Died: 1970 (aged 61–62)
- Occupation: Short story writer

Kamla Chaudhry (22 February 1908 – 1970) was an Indian short story writer in Hindi language and a Member of Parliament from Hapur in the 3rd Lok Sabha.

== Early life ==
Kamla Chaudhry was born on 22 February 1908 in Lucknow. Her father Rai Manmohan Dayal was a deputy collector. Her maternal great-grandfather was the commander of Independent Awadh forces at Lucknow in 1857 First War of Independence.

== Career ==
During the 1930 Civil disobedience movement, Chaudhry joined the Indian National Congress. Since then she was actively involved in the Indian Independence Movement and was imprisoned by the British authorities multiple times. She acted as the Senior Vice-chairperson during the 54th session of the All India Congress Committee. She was an elected member of the Constituent Assembly of India and after the constitution was adopted she served as a member of the Provincial Government of India till 1952. She was also a member of the Uttar Pradesh State Social Welfare Advisory Board.

In 1962, Chaudhry became a member of the 3rd Lok Sabha after winning the 1962 Indian general election from Hapur as an official candidate of the INC. She defeated her nearest rival by a margin of 28,633 votes. Four collections of her stories; Unmaad (1934), Picnic (1936), Yatra (1947) and Bel Patra were published. Gender discrimination, exploitation of peasants and poor condition of widows were main themes in her works.

== Personal life ==
She married J.M. Chaudhry in February 1922. Her father in law was one of founders of Swarajya Party. She had several children including Writer and Author Dr. Ira Saxena as well as Late Madhavendra Mohan and Dr. Hemendra Mohan Chaudhry.
