= Ajit Pal Tyagi =

Member of the Uttar Pradesh Legislative Assembly

Member of the Uttar Pradesh Legislative Assembly
- Incumbent
- Assumed office March 2017
- Constituency: Muradnagar

Personal details
- Born: 1 July 1973 (age 53) Ghaziabad, Uttar Pradesh, India
- Party: Bharatiya Janata Party
- Spouse: Pathika Tyagi
- Parent: Rajpal Tyagi (father)
- Education: Mahatma Jyotiba Phule Rohilkhand University
- Occupation: Lawyer
- Profession: Politician

Ajit Pal Tyagi is an Indian politician, lawyer, businessperson, and member of the Bharatiya Janata Party, the largest political party in India. He is a member of the 18th Legislative Assembly of Uttar Pradesh, representing the Muradnagar Assembly constituency of Uttar Pradesh.

== Early life ==
Ajit Pal Tyagi was born on 1 July 1973 in Ghaziabad, Uttar Pradesh, India, to a Hindu family of Rajpal Tyagi. He completed his graduation in Bachelor of Laws at Mahatma Jyotiba Phule Rohilkhand University, Bareilly, Uttar Pradesh, India.

== Posts held ==
#	From	To	Position	Comments
01	2022	Incumbent	Member, 18th Legislative Assembly	

== See also ==
- 18th Uttar Pradesh Assembly
- Muradnagar Assembly constituency
- Uttar Pradesh Legislative Assembly
