= Aslam Choudhary =

Indian politician

Member of Uttar Pradesh Legislative Assembly
- In office Mar 2017 – Mar 2022
- Preceded by: Dharmesh Singh Tomar
- Succeeded by: Dharmesh Singh Tomar
- Constituency: Dholana

Personal details
- Born: 1 January 1968 (age 58) Ghaziabad
- Party: Samajwadi Party
- Other political affiliations: Bahujan Samaj Party
- Parent: M. Nazar Ali
- Profession: Businessman

Aslam Choudhary (born 1 January 1964) is an Indian politician and member of Samajwadi Party . He represented Dholana from seventeenth Legislative Assembly of Uttar Pradesh.

He joined Samajwadi Party before 2022 Uttar Pradesh Legislative Assembly election.
