= Wahab Chaudhary =

Indian politician

Member of the Legislative Assembly
- In office 2012–2017
- Constituency: Muradnagar

Personal details
- Party: Bahujan Samaj Party

Wahab Chaudhary is the Indian politician from Uttar Pradesh, belonging to the Bahujan Samaj Party of Mayawati. He represented the Muradnagar (Assembly constituency) in the Uttar Pradesh Vidhan Sabha till 2017, having won in the 2012 Uttar Pradesh legislative assembly election with a margin of 3622 votes over Rajpal Tyagi. He often goes by just the name Wahab. He contested from Modinagar Assembly constituency of UP in 2017, but lost.

In the 2007 elections, Wahab had lost by about the same margin to Tyagi. Later he won elections of municipal body of Muradnagar and became the Chairman of the municipal body of Muradnagar under the BSP government.

== Two-hundred fold increase in assets ==
A comparison of his declared assets in 2007 and 2012 shows a 200-fold increase from Rs. 30 thousand in 2007 to 6.6 million in 2012. This is the highest increase among all representatives in the 16th state legislature.
