= Vinod Singh Bansal =

Indian politician

- Constituency: Loni (Assembly constituency)

Personal details
- Citizenship: Indian
- Party: Bharatiya Janata Party
- Occupation: Politician

Vinod Singh Bansal (Baisla) is an Indian politician from the state of Uttar Pradesh, India. Vinod Singh Bansal represents the Loni (Assembly constituency) of Uttar Pradesh.

In 2012, he lost an election for member of the Uttar Pradesh Legislative Assembly to the Bahujan Samaj Party candidate.
