= Sunil Kumar Sharma (Uttar Pradesh politician) =

Indian politician

Minister of Electronics & Information Technology Government of Uttar Pradesh
- Incumbent
- Assumed office 5 March 2024
- Chief Minister: Yogi Adityanath
- Preceded by: Yogendra Upadhyaya

Member of the Uttar Pradesh Legislative Assembly
- Incumbent
- Assumed office 11 March 2017
- Preceded by: Amarpal Sharma
- Constituency: Sahibabad
- In office 2007–2012
- Preceded by: Surendra Kumar
- Succeeded by: Suresh Bansal
- Constituency: Ghaziabad

Personal details
- Born: Patla, Ghaziabad, Uttar Pradesh
- Party: Bharatiya Janata Party BJP
- Parent: Shri Jaibhagwan Sharma
- Occupation: MLA
- Profession: Farmer, advocate, politician

Sunil Kumar Sharma is an Indian politician from Uttar Pradesh belonging to the Bharatiya Janata Party. He is a member of the Uttar Pradesh Legislative Assembly representing Sahibabad and Minister in Government of Uttar Pradesh.

Sharma is considered a close aide of RRS top leadership and Prime Minister Narendra Modi, Uttar Pradesh Chief Minister Yogi Adityanath, Defence Minister of India Rajnath Singh, BJP'S National President J.P. Nadda with whom he had worked for years. He has earlier been part of the 17th Uttar Pradesh Legislative Assembly, representing the Sahibabad constituency and was elected by the largest victory margin in the 2017 and the 2022 assembly elections. In 2022 Uttar Pradesh Legislative Assembly election he created a record by winning by the highest margin ever for a candidate in a legislative assembly election in India since independence.

== Political career ==
From 2007 to 2012, Sharma served as a member of the 15th Uttar Pradesh Legislative Assembly representing the Ghaziabad constituency.

Following the 2017 assembly elections, on 11 March 2017, he was appointed a member of the Legislative Assembly (MLA) for the Sahibabad constituency and joined the 17th Legislative Assembly. Sharma secured the largest victory margin of 150,643 votes in the election. In 2017 Sunil Sharma was appointed president of the Panchayati Raj Samiti legislative Assembly Uttar Pradesh (Ranked State Minister of Uttar Pradesh).

He received 262,317 votes in total, accounting for 62% of all votes polled. In the 2022 election, he won by 2,14,835 votes securing over 67% of all votes polled.

Sharma is also a member of the Bharatiya Janata Party.

== Record ==
Sharma is listed in India's Book of Records as he won the election of the 2022 Legislative Assembly Uttar Pradesh. He won by the highest margin ever for a candidate in a legislative assembly election in India since independence.

== Posts held ==
#	From	To	Position	Constituency
01	2007	2012	Member, 15th Legislative Assembly	Ghaziabad
02	2017	2022	Member, 17th Legislative Assembly	Sahibabad
03	2022	2027	Member, 18th Uttar Pradesh Assembly	Sahibabad
04	2017	2022	State Minister, President, Panchayati Raj Committee, Uttar Pradesh Legislative Assembly	Uttar Pradesh
05	2022	2024	State Minister, President, Committee of Examination of Audit Reports of the Local Bodies	Uttar Pradesh
06	2024	2027	Cabinet Minister, Electronics & Information, Uttar Pradesh	Uttar Pradesh

== See also ==
- Uttar Pradesh Legislative Assembly
- Seventeenth Legislative Assembly of Uttar Pradesh
- 18th Uttar Pradesh Assembly
- Bharatiya Janata Party
