= Zakir Ali =

Indian politician

Haji Zakir Ali

MLA, 16th Legislative Assembly
- In office 2012–2017
- Preceded by: None
- Succeeded by: Nand Kishor Gurjar
- Constituency: Loni

Personal details
- Born: Sher e saher 31 January 1978 (age 48) Loni
- Citizenship: Indian
- Party: Samajwadi Party
- Other political affiliations: Bahujan Samaj party 2012 to 2018
- Spouse: Shaheen Khan (wife)
- Children: 3
- Education: Not known
- Occupation: Business Real estate
- Profession: Farmer and politician

Haji Zakir Ali is a former Indian politician and Member of Legislative Assembly of Uttar Pradesh, India. He represents the Loni constituency of Uttar Pradesh and is a member of the Samajwadi Party political party.

== Early life and education ==
Zakir Ali was born in Delhi. He is educated till tenth grade (alma mater not known) .

== Political career ==
Zakir Ali has been a MLA for one term. He represented the Loni constituency and is a member of the Samajwadi Party political party.

== Posts held ==
#	From	To	Position	Comments
01	2012	Incumbent	Member, 16th Legislative Assembly	
