= Raj Kumar Goel Institute of Technology =

Private college in Ghaziabad, India

Raj Kumar Goel Institute of Technology, Ghaziabad
- Motto: "Knowledge is Enveloped by ignorance" (Bhagwat Gita, Chapter 5, St 15)
- Established: 2000
- Affiliations: Dr. A.P.J. Abdul Kalam Technical University, AICTE
- Chairman: Shri Dinesh Kumar Goel
- Dean: H.G. Garg
- Director: Dr. B.C. Sharma
- Vice-chairman: Mr Akshat Goel
- Location: Ghaziabad, India; 28.708566°N 77.441648°E
- Campus: Urban
- Website: rkgit.edu.in

Raj Kumar Goel Institute of Technology (RKGIT), is a private college in Ghaziabad, India. It is affiliated to Dr. A.P.J. Abdul Kalam Technical University.

== History ==
Raj Kumar Goel Institute of Technology was established in 2000 by late Sri Raj Kumar Goel. The institute is recognized by both governing bodies, All India Council for Technical Education (AICTE) and Council of India (PCI) and it is affiliated to Dr. A.P.J. Abdul Kalam Technical University.

In April 2020 during COVID-19 pandemic in India the institute was temporarily converted in quarantine center by order of the Government of Uttar Pradesh.

== Campus ==
The institute is spread over 27 acres. Its facilities include canteens, hostels, library, sports, transportation, ATMs, computer lab, classrooms, auditorium and conference hall, as well as language lab and medical facilities.

== Events ==
Each year, college students participate in national and state-level sports, games, Hackathon debates and other competitions.

=== Sports Council ===
Sports Council is a student council that organizes events for both boys and girls. This event is generally kept intra-college. Some 30 sports are supported. The cricket tournament and football events are the top attraction for most students.

== Academics ==
The degree programs (aka courses) offered at RKGIT fall into the following categories.

=== B. Tech. ===
Bachelor of Technology in Mechanical Engineering, Information Technology, Civil Engineering, Electrical & Electronics Engineering, Computer Science and Engineering, Electronics and Communication Engineering. The duration of the full-time B.Tech program is four years.

=== C. Tech. ===
Master of Technology in Electronics and Communication Engineering. The duration of the Post Graduate Program in Engineering is two years.

=== MBA ===
It was started in 2003. The duration of a full-time program MBA is two years.

=== Pharmacy ===
This includes M. Pharma (Pharmaceutics), M. Pharma (Pharmacology). The program launched 2004. The Pharmacy course is accredited by National Board of Accreditation.

Course Name	No. of Seats	Course Duration
B.Tech in Computer Science	120	4 years
B.Tech in Computer Science and Engineering (Internet of Things)	120	4 years
B.Tech in Computer Science and Engineering (Artificial Intelligence and Machine Learning)	120	4 years
B.Tech in Computer Science and Engineering (DATA Science)	120	4 years
B.Tech in Computer Science and Engineering	360	4 years
B.Tech in Electronics and Communication Engineering	120	4 years
B.Tech in Mechanical Engineering	30	4 years
B.Tech in Information Technology	120	4 years

== Admissions ==
Admission is entirely based on the merit system via JEE Main Entrance Examination and online UPTAC counselling. Unfilled seats are filled as per the norms of Dr. APJ Abdul Kalam Technical University, State Government and All India Council for Technical Education (AICTE).

== Amenities ==
RKGIT has eight hostels, six for boys and two for girls. Most of the students live in on-campus hostels.

Students enjoy indoor sports such as table tennis and snooker, and outdoor sports including cricket, volleyball, and kabaddi.

The college has the following amenities.

- Bank and ATM facilities inside the college campus
- A spacious auditorium
- Gym for both boys and girls
- One cafeteria is separately available for boys and girls. Only vegetarian food is served in the mess.
- The institute is tied-up with some of the well-known hospitals and institutions of Ghaziabad.
- Healthcare: Availability of the emergency facilities such as first aid and ambulance in the hostels
- Safety and security in the entire campus is monitored and controlled by the security personnel
- Modernly designed 60 laboratories with workshops and computer labs
- High tech classrooms for modern teaching and learning
- Surrounding of approximately 27 acres with a large sports ground, staff rooms, seminar halls, classrooms, lecture halls
- Alumni associations

== Societies ==
RKGIT has the following societies:

- Photoholics
- Birds
- Black Illusion
- Bytes Technical Magazine
- Electrical and Electronics Engineering Department
- Electrazz Club
- Electronics & Communication Engineering Department
- Krystaspark
- IEEE Student branch
- Association of Electronics and Communication Engineers
- Computer Science & Engineering Department
- Computer Society of India (CSI) Student branch
- Computer Science Student Society (CSSS)
- Mechanical Engineering Department
- Society of Automotive Engineers BAJA
- Satyarth Dramatic Society
- YANTRIKOM
- Indian Society of New Era Engineers (ISNEE)
- Unwaan Theater Dramatic Society
- PUSHPAK: THE FLYING CLUB
- Taxila
- SPIC EII
- STHAPATYA

== Recognition ==
- Best Engineering College in Ghaziabad awarded by Big Brand Research Pvt. Ltd. (2011)
- "Certification of Appreciation 2009" awarded by UPTU.
- National Employability Award by Aspiring Minds in 2013-14

== Research ==
- Securing 4G Networks With Y-Communication Using AKA Protocol
- Chandra, Munehs; Gupta, Vikrant; Paul, Santosh Kr. (June 2011). "A Statistical Approach for Automatic Text Summarization by Extraction". 2011 International Conference on Communication Systems and Network Technologies. pp. 268–271. doi:10.1109/CSNT.2011.65. ISBN 978-1-4577-0543-4. S2CID 11974528.
- Gupta, Zatin; Sen, Tanay; Gupta, Vinayak; V., Vaishnavi; V., Vijay (15 June 2018). "Home-Automation using Arduino-UNO Board and Android App". International Journal of Computer Applications. 180 (51): 18–20. doi:10.5120/ijca2018917345. S2CID 54046729.
- Singh, Namrata; Bhardwaj, Jayati (December 2017). "Randomized LSB Based Video Steganography for Hiding Acoustic Data Using XOR Technique". 2017 International Conference on Computer, Electrical & Communication Engineering (ICCECE). IEEE. pp. 1–7. doi:10.1109/iccece.2017.8526224. ISBN 978-1-5386-1176-0. S2CID 53284067.

== Gallery ==
Admission block

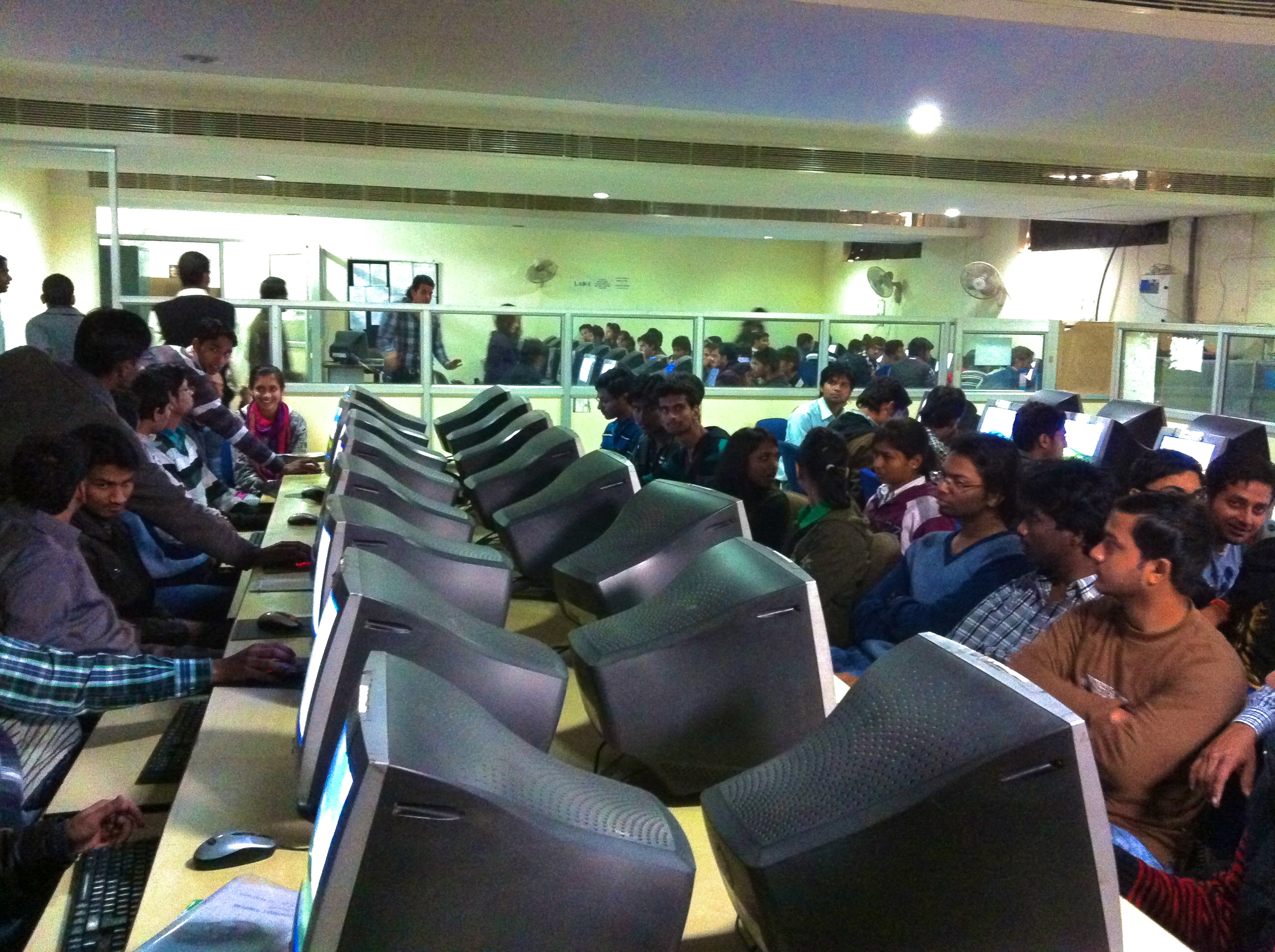
Wikipedia Workshop in the college

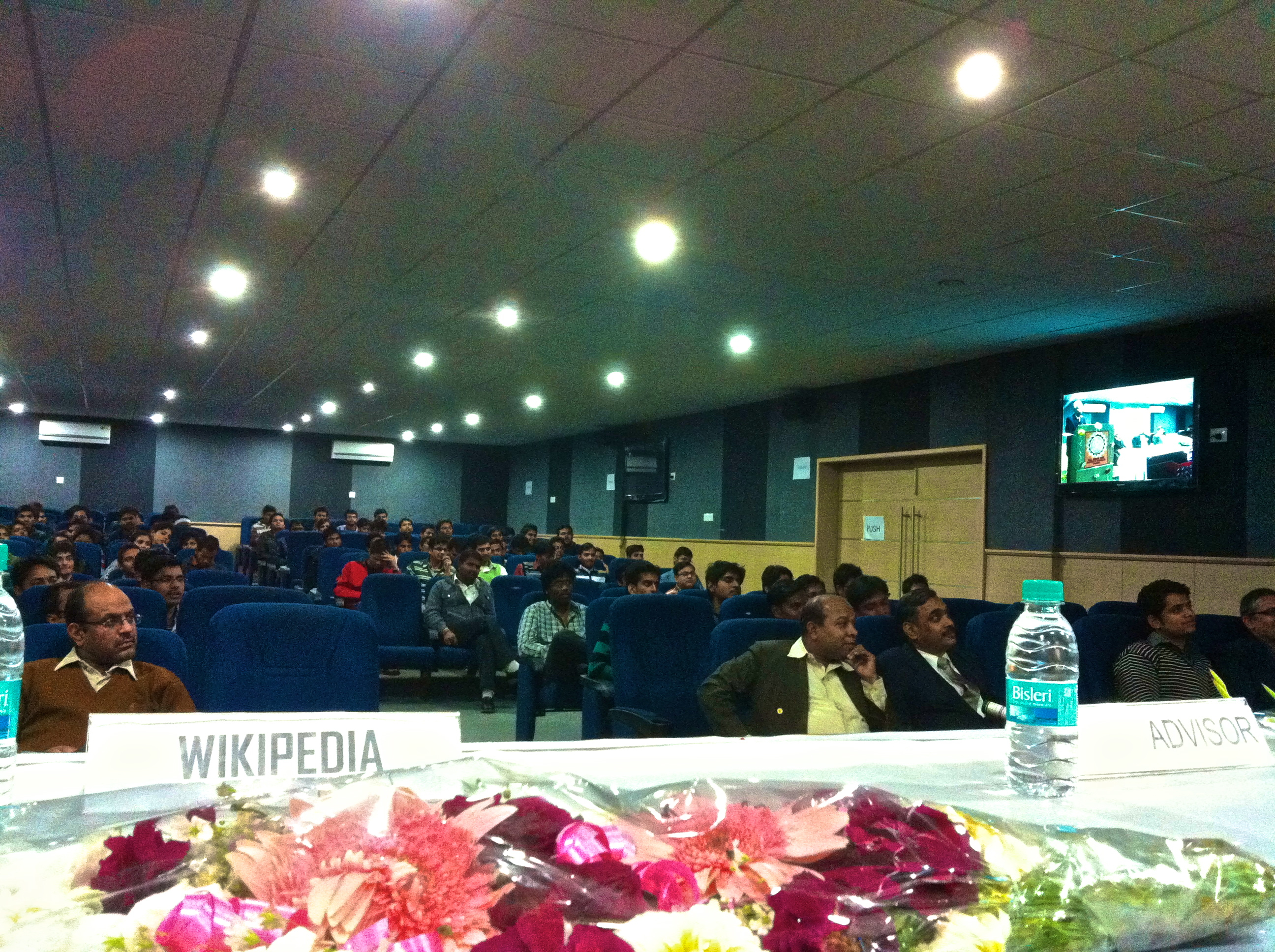
Wikipedia Workshop in RKGIT

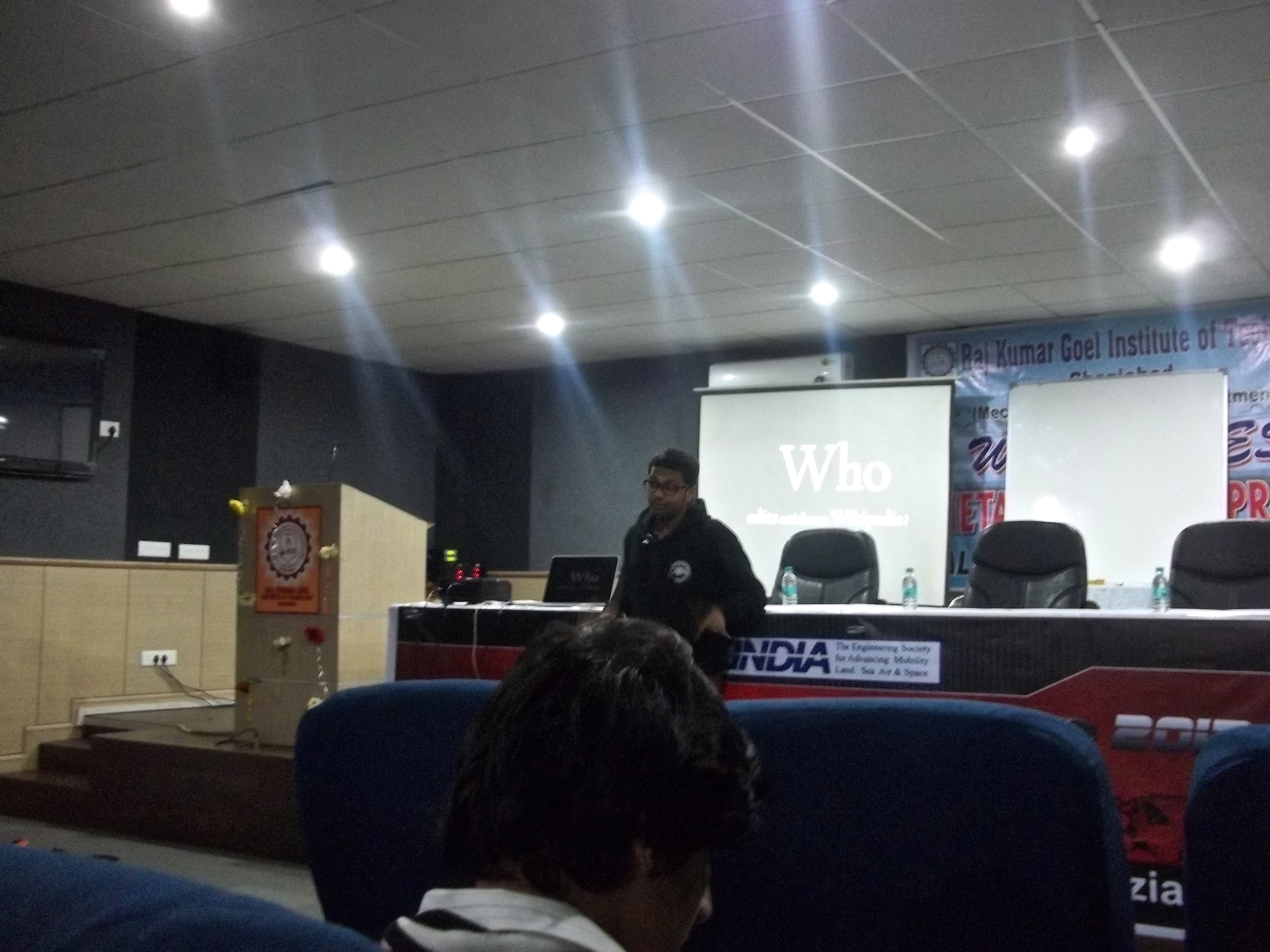
Wikipedia Workshop in 2013
