= Roop Chaudhary =

Indian politician

- Constituency: Khekada Loni (Assembly constituency)

Member of the Uttar Pradesh Legislative Assembly
- Incumbent
- Assumed office 1996–2002

Personal details
- Party: Bharatiya Janata Party
- Occupation: Politician

Roop Chaudhary is an Indian politician and member of the Bharatiya Janata Party. Chaudhary is a first-term member of the Uttar Pradesh Legislative Assembly in 1993 from the Khekada Loni (Assembly constituency) in Uttar Pradesh.

== Life ==
He was born in a Gurjar family in Ganoli Village of Ghaziabad, Uttar Pradesh.
