= Vasundhra =

- Interactive map of Vasundhra

Government
  - Body: U.P. Housing & Development Board Web site =http://www.upavp.in/

Languages
  - Official: Hindi, English
- Time zone: UTC+5:30 (IST)
- PIN: 201012

Vasundhara is a township within the jurisdiction of U.P. Housing & Development Board Ghaziabad Circle (Vasundhara Zone) in Ghaziabad District of Uttar Pradesh, India. It falls in Delhi's National Capital Region.

== Education ==
Colleges

- Jaipuria Institute of Management
- Jaipuria School of Business

Schools

- Delhi Public School, Ghaziabad
- Seth Anandram Jaipuria School, Vasundhara
- Vanasthali Public School, Vasundhara

== See also ==
- Hindon River
- Noida
- New Delhi
