= Dholana Assembly constituency =

Constituency of the Uttar Pradesh legislative assembly in India

Dhaulana
- Constituency No. 58 for the Uttar Pradesh Legislative Assembly

Constituency details
- Country: India
- Region: North India
- State: Uttar Pradesh
- District: Hapur
- Established: 2008
- Total electors: 405,242 (2022)
- Reservation: None

Member of Legislative Assembly
- 18th Uttar Pradesh Legislative Assembly
- Incumbent Dharmesh Singh Tomar
- Party: Bharatiya Janata Party

Dhaulana Assembly constituency is one of the 403 constituencies of the Uttar Pradesh Legislative Assembly, India. It is a part of the Ghaziabad district and one of the five assembly constituencies in the Ghaziabad Lok Sabha constituency. First election in this assembly constituency was held in 2012 after the "Delimitation of Parliamentary and Assembly Constituencies Order, 2008" was passed and the constituency was formed in 2008. The constituency is assigned identification number 58. Dholana is surrounded by a large number of Rajput (Thakur) villages of Sisodia and Tomar Rajput clan.

== Wards / Areas ==
Extent of Dhaulana Assembly constituency is KC Dhaulana, Shaulana, Dhikri, Karanpur, Kakrana, Naraynanpur, Sapnawat, PCs Girdharpur Tumrail, Sabli, Raghunathpur, Baroda Hinduwan, Anwarpur, Dadri, Badnauli, Sarawa of Hapur KC & Pilkhuwa MB of Hapur Tehsil; Ghaziabad KC (excluding PCs Duhi, Ataur, Shamsher, Sardarpur & Bahadurpur) and Dasna NP of Ghaziabad Tehsil.

== Members of the Legislative Assembly ==
#	Term	Name	Party	From	To	Ref
01	16th Vidhan Sabha	Dharmesh Singh Tomar	Samajwadi Party	Mar-2012	Mar-2017	
02	17th Vidhan Sabha	Aslam Choudhary	Bahujan Samaj Party	Mar-2017	Mar-2022	
03	18th Vidhan Sabha	Dharmesh Singh Tomar	Bharatiya Janata Party	Mar-2022	Incumbent	

== Election results ==
=== 2027 ===
2027 Uttar Pradesh Legislative Assembly election: Dhaulana
Party	Candidate	Votes	%	±%
INDIA				
NDA				
BSP				
NOTA	None of the above			
Majority				
Turnout				
gain from		Swing		

=== 2022 ===
2022 Uttar Pradesh Legislative Assembly election: Dholana
Party	Candidate	Votes	%	±%
BJP	Dharmesh Singh Tomar	125,028	44.65	+11.16
SP	Aslam Choudhary	112,400	40.14	+11.86
BSP	Basid Pradhan	32,999	11.78	−23.12
AIMIM	Arif	3,520	1.26	
NOTA	None of the above	950	0.34	−0.17
Majority		12,628	4.51	+3.1
Turnout		280,013	67.77	+0.88
BJP gain from BSP		Swing		

=== 2017 ===
2017 Uttar Pradesh Legislative Assembly election: Dholana
Party	Candidate	Votes	%	±%
BSP	Aslam Choudhary	88,580	34.9	
BJP	Ramesh Chand Tomar	85,004	33.49	
SP	Dharmesh Singh Tomar	71,786	28.28	
RLD	Nagendar Singh Urf Nagan	3,025	1.19	
NOTA	None of the above	1,279	0.51	
Majority		3,576	1.41	
Turnout		253,827	66.89	
BSP gain from BJP		Swing		

=== 2012 ===
2012 General Elections: Dholana
Party	Candidate	Votes	%	±%
SP	Dharmesh Singh Tomar	59,150	29.24	–
BSP	Aslam Choudhary	49,811	24.62	–
BJP	Y.P. Singh	36,715	18.15	–
	Remainder 13 candidates	56,607	27.99	–
Majority		9,339	4.62	–
Turnout		202,283	65.86	–
SP hold		Swing		

== See also ==
- Ghaziabad district, India
- Ghaziabad Lok Sabha constituency
- Sixteenth Legislative Assembly of Uttar Pradesh
- Uttar Pradesh Legislative Assembly
