= Loni Assembly constituency =

Constituency of the Uttar Pradesh legislative assembly in India

Loni
- Constituency No. 53 for the Uttar Pradesh Legislative Assembly

Constituency details
- Country: India
- Region: North India
- State: Uttar Pradesh
- Division: Meerut
- District: Ghaziabad
- Lok Sabha constituency: Ghaziabad
- Established: 2008
- Total electors: 4,38,670 (2022)
- Reservation: None

Member of Legislative Assembly
- 18th Uttar Pradesh Legislative Assembly
- Incumbent Nand Kishor Gurjar
- Party: BJP
- Alliance: NDA
- Elected year: 2022

Loni Assembly constituency is one of the 403 constituencies of the Uttar Pradesh Legislative Assembly, India. It is a part of the Ghaziabad district and one of the five assembly constituencies in the Ghaziabad Lok Sabha constituency. First election in this assembly constituency was held in 2012 after the "Delimitation of Parliamentary and Assembly Constituencies Order, 2008" was passed and the constituency was constituted in 2008.

== Wards / Areas ==
Extent of Loni Assembly constituency is PCs Agraula, Lutfullapur Nawada, Badshahpur Sirauli, Aurangabad Ristal, Shakalpura, Behta Hajipur, Pachaira, Chirori, Ganouli, Pavisadakpur, Meerpur Hindu, Asalatpur (Farookh Nagar), Sirora Salempur, Loni, Banthla, Mandaula, Nistauli, Sharfuddinpur Jawali of Loni KC, Rampark Extn. Ilayachipur 0 km distance from Delhi, Tronica City (Trans Delhi signature City) Upsidc & Loni NP of Ghaziabad Tehsil.

== Members of Legislative Assembly ==
Year	Member	Party
Till 2012 : Constituency did not exist
2012	Zakir Ali	Bahujan Samaj Party
2017	Nand Kishor Gurjar	Bharatiya Janata Party
2022	Nand Kishor Gurjar	Bharatiya Janata Party

== Election results ==
=== 2027 ===
2027 Uttar Pradesh Legislative Assembly election: Loni
Party	Candidate	Votes	%	±%
INDIA				
NDA				
BSP				
NOTA	None of the above			
Majority				
Turnout				
gain from		Swing		

=== 2022 ===
2022 Uttar Pradesh Legislative Assembly election: Loni
Party	Candidate	Votes	%	±%
BJP	Nand Kishor Gurjar	127,410	40.44	−0.75
RLD	Madan Bhaiya	118,734	37.68	+22.19
Independent	Ranjita Dhama	27,289	8.66	
BSP	Haji Akil Chaudhary	25,717	8.16	−17.44
AAP	Dr Sachin Kumar Sharma	6,324	2.01	
AIMIM	Dr Mehtab Ali	3,214	1.02	
NOTA	None of the above	1,565	0.5	−0.11
Majority		8,676	2.76	−12.83
Turnout		315,095	61.41	+1.29
BJP hold		Swing	-1%	

=== 2017 ===
2017 Uttar Pradesh Legislative Assembly election: Loni
Party	Candidate	Votes	%	±%
BJP	Nand Kishor Gurjar	113,088	41.19	
BSP	Zakir Ali	70,275	25.6	
RLD	Madan Bhaiya	42,539	15.49	
SP	Rashid Malik	42,302	15.41	
Independent	Amit Kumar	3,808	1.39	
NOTA	None of the above	1,663	0.61	
Majority		42,813	15.59	
Turnout		274,555	60.12	
BJP gain from BSP		Swing		

=== 2012 ===
2012 Uttar Pradesh Legislative Assembly election: Loni
Party	Candidate	Votes	%	±%
BSP	Zakir Ali	89,603	41.52	−
RLD	Madan Bhaiya	64,355	29.82	−
BJP	Vinod Singh Bansal	48,319	22.39	−
SP	Aulad Ali	6,666	3.09	−
IND	Dr Habibur Rahman Khan	1,863	0.86	−
Majority		25,248	11.7	−
Turnout		2,15,801	60.19	−
BSP hold		Swing		

== See also ==
- Ghaziabad district
- Ghaziabad Lok Sabha constituency
- Sixteenth Legislative Assembly of Uttar Pradesh
- Uttar Pradesh Legislative Assembly
