= Muradnagar Assembly constituency =

Constituency of the Uttar Pradesh legislative assembly in India

Muradnagar
- Constituency No. 54 for the Uttar Pradesh Legislative Assembly

Constituency details
- Country: India
- Region: North India
- State: Uttar Pradesh
- District: Ghaziabad
- Established: 1967
- Total electors: 346,610 (2012)
- Reservation: None

Member of Legislative Assembly
- 18th Uttar Pradesh Legislative Assembly
- Incumbent Ajit Pal Tyagi
- Party: Bharatiya Janata Party

Muradnagar Assembly constituency is one of the 403 constituencies of the Uttar Pradesh Legislative Assembly, India. It is a part of the Ghaziabad district and one of the five assembly constituencies in the Ghaziabad Lok Sabha constituency. First election in this assembly constituency was held in 1967 after the "Delimitation order" was passed and the constituency was constituted in 1967. The constituency was assigned identification number 54 after the "Delimitation of Parliamentary and Assembly Constituencies Order, 2008" was passed. Muradnagar assembly constituency have having a low dynamics with 91.50% Hindus and 5.16% are Muslims.

== Wards / Areas ==
Extent of Muradnagar Assembly constituency is KC Muradnagar and Muradnagar MB of Modinagar Tehsil; PCs Duhai, Ataur, Shamsher, Sadarpur, Bahadurpur of Ghaziabad KC, Ward Nos. 7, 12, 24, 27, 31, 32, 34, 39, 40, 43, 45, 47, 49, 51, 54, 56 & 58 in Ghaziabad (M Corp.) of Ghaziabad Tehsil.

== Members of the Legislative Assembly ==
Year	Member	Party
1967	G. S. Chaudhri	Independent
1969	Ishwar Dayal Tyagi	Bharatiya Kranti Dal
1974	Rajpal Tyagi	Indian National Congress
1977	Anwar Ahmad Chaudhari	Janata Party
1980	Ishwar Dayal Tyagi	Indian National Congress (I)
1985	Sakhawat Hussain	Lokdal
1989	Rajpal Tyagi	Independent
1991	Rajpal Tyagi	Indian National Congress
1993	Prem Singh	Janata Dal
1996	Rajpal Tyagi	Samajwadi Party
2002	Rajpal Tyagi	Indian National Congress
2007	Rajpal Tyagi	Independent
2012	Wahab Chaudhary	Bahujan Samaj Party
2017	Ajit Pal Tyagi	Bharatiya Janata Party
2022	Ajit Pal Tyagi	Bharatiya Janata Party

== Election results ==
=== 2027 ===
2027 Uttar Pradesh Legislative Assembly election: Muradnagar
Party	Candidate	Votes	%	±%
INDIA				
NDA				
BSP				
NOTA	None of the above			
Majority				
Turnout				
gain from		Swing		

=== 2022 ===
2022 Uttar Pradesh Legislative Assembly election: Muradnagar
Party	Candidate	Votes	%	±%
BJP	Ajit Pal Tyagi	169,290	61.63	+6.11
RLD	Surendra Kumar Munni	72,195	26.28	+23.66
BSP	Ayyuv Khan	20,589	7.5	−12.67
INC	Vijendra Yadav	7,055	2.57	−17.15
NOTA	None of the above	1,364	0.5	+0.08
Majority		97,095	35.35	+0.0
Turnout		274,689	60.01	−0.46
BJP gain from BSP		Swing		

=== 2017 ===
U. P. Legislative Assembly Election, 2017: Muradnagar
Party	Candidate	Votes	%	±%
BJP	Ajit Pal Tyagi	140,759	55.52	
BSP	Sudhan Kumar	51,147	20.17	
INC	Surendra Prakash Goel	49,989	19.72	
RLD	Ajay Pal Singh	6,648	2.62	
NOTA	None of the above	1,053	0.42	
Majority		89,612	35.35	
Turnout		253,532	60.47	
BJP gain from BSP		Swing		

=== 2012 ===
2012 General Elections: Muradnagar
Party	Candidate	Votes	%	±%
BSP	Wahab Chaudhary	57,103	26.43	−
SP	Rajpal Tyagi	53,481	24.75	−
BJP	Birjpal Teotia	52,563	24.33	−
INC	Surendra Kumar Munni	49,364	22.85	−
	Remainder 9 candidates	3,550	1.65	−
Majority		3,622	1.68	−
Turnout		216,061	62.34	−
BSP gain from Independent		Swing		

== See also ==
- Ghaziabad district, India
- Ghaziabad Lok Sabha constituency
- Sixteenth Legislative Assembly of Uttar Pradesh
- Uttar Pradesh Legislative Assembly
