= Suresh Bansal =

Indian politician (1943–2022)

MLA, 16th Legislative Assembly
- In office 8 March 2012 – 11 March 2017
- Preceded by: Sunil Kumar Sharma
- Succeeded by: Atul Garg
- Constituency: Ghaziabad

Personal details
- Born: 31 January 1943 Ghaziabad, United Provinces, British India
- Died: 29 January 2022 (aged 78) Ghaziabad, Uttar Pradesh, India
- Party: Bahujan Samaj Party
- Education: Meerut College & Dr. Bhimrao Ambedkar University
- Profession: Farmer & politician

Suresh Bansal (31 January 1943 – 29 January 2022) was an Indian politician and a member of the 16th Legislative Assembly of Uttar Pradesh of India. He represented the Ghaziabad constituency of Uttar Pradesh and was a member of the Bahujan Samaj Party political party.

== Early life and education ==
Suresh Bansal was born in Ghaziabad. He attended the Meerut College & Dr. Bhimrao Ambedkar University and attained Master in Science degree.

== Political career ==
Bansal was a MLA for one term. He represented the Ghaziabad constituency and was a member of the Bahujan Samaj Party political party.

He lost his seat in the 2017 Uttar Pradesh Assembly election to Atul Garg of the Bharatiya Janata Party.

== Death ==
Bansal died from COVID-19 at a hospital in Kaushambi, Ghaziabad, on 29 January 2022, at the age of 78.

== Posts held ==
#	From	To	Position	Comments
01	March 2012	March 2017	Member, 16th Legislative Assembly	

== See also ==
- Ghaziabad
- Sixteenth Legislative Assembly of Uttar Pradesh
- Uttar Pradesh Legislative Assembly
