= Surendra Prakash Goel =

Indian politician (1946–2020)

Member of Parliament Lok Sabha
- In office 2004–2009
- Preceded by: Dr. Ramesh Chand Tomar
- Succeeded by: constituency abolished
- Constituency: Hapur

Member of Uttar Pradesh Legislative Assembly
- In office 2002–2004
- Preceded by: Baleshwar Tyagi
- Succeeded by: Surendra Kumar Munni
- Constituency: Ghaziabad

Personal details
- Born: 1 January 1946 Ghaziabad, Uttar Pradesh, India
- Died: 14 August 2020 (aged 74) Ganga Ram Hospital, Delhi
- Cause of death: COVID-19
- Party: Indian National Congress
- Spouse: Sangeeta Goel
- Children: 1 son and 1 daughter

Surendra Prakash Goel (1 January 1946 – 14 August 2020), was an Indian politician from Gaziabad, Uttar Pradesh. He was a former member of Uttar Pradesh Legislative Assembly.

== Death ==
He died due to COVID-19 during the COVID-19 pandemic in India in Delhi on 14 August 2020.

== Life ==
He stood for the 2004 Lok Sabha elections on the Indian National Congress (INC) ticket and won from Ghaziabad-Hapur. He was defeated by the president of BJP Rajnath Singh in the next general elections in 2009. He was defeated again by Suresh Bansal of BSP in 2012 assembly elections. As of 2012, he was charged with one criminal case for preventing a public servant from discharging Government duties.
