= Dharmesh Singh Tomar =

Indian politician

Dharmesh Singh Tomar धर्मेश सिंह तोमर

Member of the Uttar Pradesh Legislative Assembly
- Incumbent
- Assumed office Mar 2022
- Preceded by: Aslam Choudhary
- Constituency: Dholana
- In office Mar 2012 – Mar 2017
- Preceded by: Constituency doesn't exist
- Succeeded by: Aslam Choudhary
- Constituency: Dholana

Personal details
- Born: 24 December 1966 (age 59) Ghaziabad
- Citizenship: Indian
- Party: Bharatiya Janata Party(2019-Present)
- Other political affiliations: Samajwadi Party
- Spouse: Alka (wife)
- Children: 1 son & 1 daughter
- Parent: Chandramukut Tomar (father)
- Education: Chaudhary Charan Singh University
- Profession: Farmer, politician

Dharmesh Singh Tomar (Hindi: धर्मेश सिंह तोमर) is an Indian politician from The Bharatiya Janata Party and a member of the 16th Legislative Assembly of Uttar Pradesh of India. He represented the Dholana constituency of Uttar Pradesh from Samajwadi Party.

== Early life and education ==
Dharmesh Singh Tomar was born in Ghaziabad. He attended the Chaudhary Charan Singh University and attained Master of Arts & Bachelor of Education degrees.

== Political career ==
Dharmesh Singh Tomar has been a MLA for one term. He represented the Dholana constituency and is a member of the bhartiya janta party political party.

== Posts held ==
#	From	To	Position	Comments
01	2012	Mar-2017	Member, 16th Legislative Assembly	
#	From	To	Position	Comments
02	2022	present	Member, 18th Legislative Assembly	

== See also ==
- Dholana
- Sixteenth Legislative Assembly of Uttar Pradesh
- Uttar Pradesh Legislative Assembly
