= Sahibabad =

- Locality
- Location in Rajender nagar Sec2 Sahibabad Ghaziabad Uttar Pradesh, India
- Coordinates: 28°41′N 77°24′E
- Country India: India
- State: Uttar Pradesh
- District: Ghaziabad

Government
  - Type: BJP
  - MLA: Sunil Kumar Sharma
- Time zone: UTC+5:30 (IST)
- PIN: 2010-05,06,07,10,11,12,14
- Telephone code +91: 91-120
- Vehicle registration: UP-14

Sahibabad is the name for a group of industrial, residential and commercial areas within the jurisdiction of Ghaziabad Municipal Corporation (Vasundhara Zone) in Ghaziabad District of Uttar Pradesh, India. It touches the borders of Delhi, Noida and City Zone of Ghaziabad and constitutes a part of the Delhi National Capital Region.

== Notable people ==
- Sunil Kumar Sharma, Member of the Legislative Assembly
