= Ghaziabad Assembly constituency =

Constituency of the Uttar Pradesh legislative assembly in India

Ghaziabad
- Constituency No. 56 for the Uttar Pradesh Legislative Assembly

Constituency details
- Country: India
- Region: North India
- State: Uttar Pradesh
- District: Ghaziabad
- Total electors: 461644 (2024)
- Reservation: None

Member of Legislative Assembly
- 18th Uttar Pradesh Legislative Assembly
- Incumbent Sanjeev Sharma
- Party: Bharatiya Janata Party
- Elected year: 2024

Ghaziabad Assembly constituency is one of the 403 constituencies of the Uttar Pradesh Legislative Assembly, India. It is a part of the Ghaziabad district and one of the five assembly constituencies in the Ghaziabad Lok Sabha constituency. First election in this assembly constituency was held in 1957 after the "DPACO (1956)" (delimitation order) was passed in 1956. After the "Delimitation of Parliamentary and Assembly Constituencies Order, 2008" was passed in 2008, the constituency was assigned identification number 56. VVPAT facility with EVMs will be here in 2017 U.P. assembly polls.

== Wards / Areas ==
Extent of Ghaziabad Assembly constituency is Ward Nos. 2 to 6, 10, 11, 15, 17, 21, 22, 23, 28, 29, 35, 36, 37, 42, 44, 46, 48, 52, 53, 57 & 59 in Ghaziabad (M Corp.) of Ghaziabad Tehsil.

== Members of Legislative Assembly ==
| Year | Member | Party |
|---|---|---|
| 1957 | Teja Singh | Indian National Congress |
| 1962 | Teja Singh | Indian National Congress |
| 1967 | Pyare Lal | Republican Party of India |
| 1969 | Pyare Lal | Samyukta Socialist Party |
| 1974 | Pyare Lal | Indian National Congress |
| 1977 | Rajendra Chaudhary | Janata Party |
| 1980 | Surendra Kumar Munni | Indian National Congress (U) |
| 1985 | Krishan Kumar Sharma | Indian National Congress |
| 1989 | Surendra Kumar Munni | Indian National Congress |
| 1991 | Baleshwar Tyagi | Bharatiya Janata Party |
| 1993 | Baleshwar Tyagi | Bharatiya Janata Party |
| 1996 | Baleshwar Tyagi | Bharatiya Janata Party |
| 2002 | Surendra Prakash Goel | Indian National Congress |
| 2004^ | Surendra Kumar Munni | Samajwadi Party |
| 2007 | Sunil Kumar Sharma | Bharatiya Janata Party |
| 2012 | Suresh Bansal | Bahujan Samaj Party |
| 2017 | Atul Garg | Bharatiya Janata Party |
| 2022 | Atul Garg | Bharatiya Janata Party |
| 2024^ | Sanjeev Sharma | Bharatiya Janata Party |

^ denotes bypoll

== Election results ==
=== 2027 ===
2027 Uttar Pradesh Legislative Assembly election: Ghaziabad
| Party | Candidate | Votes | % | ±% |
|---|---|---|---|---|
| INDIA | | | | |
| NDA | | | | |
| BSP | | | | |
| NOTA | None of the above | | | |
| Majority | | | | |
| Turnout | | | | |
| gain from | | Swing | | |

=== 2024 by-election ===
Uttar Pradesh Legislative Assembly by-election, 2024: Ghaziabad
| Party | Candidate | Votes | % | ±% |
|---|---|---|---|---|
| BJP | Sanjeev Sharma | 96,946 | 62.99 | +1.62 |
| SP | Singh Raj Jatav | 27,595 | 17.93 | −0.32 |
| BSP | Parmanand Garg | 10,736 | 6.98 | −11.27 |
| AIMIM | Ravi Kumar | 6,536 | 4.25 | New |
| ASP(KR) | Satyapal Chaudhary | 6,304 | 4.10 | New |
| NOTA | None of the above | 792 | 0.51 | −0.99 |
| Majority | | 69,351 | 62.99 | 45.06 |
| Turnout | | 1,53,904 | 33.30 | −18.47 |
| BJP hold | | Swing | +1.62 | |

=== 2022 ===
2022 Uttar Pradesh Legislative Assembly election: Ghaziabad
| Party | Candidate | Votes | % | ±% |
|---|---|---|---|---|
| BJP | Atul Garg | 150,205 | 61.37 | ▲6.38 |
| SP | Vishal Verma | 44,668 | 18.25 | |
| BSP | Krishan Kumar | 32,691 | 13.36 | ▼10.41 |
| INC | Sushant Goyal | 11,818 | 4.83 | ▼12.72 |
| NOTA | None of the above | 1,238 | 0.51 | ▼0.02 |
| Majority | | 105,537 | 43.12 | ▲11.9 |
| Turnout | | 244,766 | 51.75 | ▼1.51 |
| BJP hold | | Swing | +6.38 | |

=== 2017 ===
2017 Uttar Pradesh Legislative Assembly election: Ghaziabad
| Party | Candidate | Votes | % | ±% |
|---|---|---|---|---|
| BJP | Atul Garg | 124,201 | 54.99 | |
| BSP | Suresh Bansal | 53,696 | 23.77 | |
| INC | K. K. Sharma | 39,648 | 17.55 | |
| Independent | Dhirendra | 2,136 | 0.95 | |
| RLD | Sultan Singh | 2,072 | 0.92 | |
| NOTA | None of the above | 1,184 | 0.53 | |
| Majority | | 70,505 | 31.22 | |
| Turnout | | 225,856 | 53.26 | |
| BJP gain from BSP | | Swing | +19.42 | |

=== 2012 ===
2012 Uttar Pradesh Legislative Assembly election: Ghaziabad
| Party | Candidate | Votes | % | ±% |
|---|---|---|---|---|
| BSP | Suresh Bansal | 64,485 | 35.57 | |
| BJP | Atul Garg | 52,364 | 28.88 | |
| INC | Surendra Prakash Goel | 37,159 | 20.49 | |
| SP | Pawan Sharma | 17,155 | 9.46 | |
| PECP | Brij Kishor | 2,078 | 1.15 | |
| Majority | | 12,121 | 6.69 | |
| Turnout | | 1,81,309 | 54.08 | |
| BSP gain from BJP | | Swing | | |

== See also ==
- Ghaziabad district, India
- Ghaziabad Lok Sabha constituency
- Sixteenth Legislative Assembly of Uttar Pradesh
- Uttar Pradesh Legislative Assembly
