= Amarpal Sharma =

Indian politician

MLA, 16th Legislative Assembly
- In office March 2012 – March 2017
- Preceded by: None
- Succeeded by: Sunil Kumar Sharma
- Constituency: Sahibabad

Personal details
- Born: 1 January 1968 (age 58) Ghaziabad, Uttar Pradesh, India
- Party: Bahujan Samaj Party (till 2017); Indian National Congress (2017-2021); Samajwadi Party (2021-present)
- Spouse: Mohini Sharma (wife)
- Children: 1 son & 3 daughters
- Parent: Shyamlal Sharma (father)
- Education: Inter Mediat Rajkiya Vihayalya
- Profession: Farmer and politician

Amarpal Sharma is an Indian politician and was a member of the 16th Legislative Assembly of Uttar Pradesh of India. He represented the Sahibabad constituency of Uttar Pradesh and was a member of the Bahujan Samaj Party but he left the party and eventually became a member of the Samajwadi Party.

== Early life and education ==
Amarpal Sharma was born in Ghaziabad. He attended the Inter Mediat Rajkiya Vihayalya and was educated to the Twelfth grade.

== Political career ==
Amarpal Sharma has been a MLA for one term. He represented the Sahibabad constituency and was a member of the Bahujan Samaj Party political party until 16 January 2017, when he was expelled for anti-party activities by allegedly attempting to cooperate with the rival Bharatiya Janata Party. He has since joined the Indian National Congress.

== Posts held ==
#	From	To	Position	Comments
01	2012	Mar-2017	Member, 16th Legislative Assembly	

== See also ==
- Uttar Pradesh Legislative Assembly
