= AJGAR =

Suggested alliance of the Ahir, Jat, Gurjar, and Rajput castes

AJGAR is a suggested alliance of the Ahir, Jat, Gurjar and Rajput communities of the Indian subcontinent. It was first proposed by Sir Chhotu Ram, a rural leader and politician in pre-independence India as an agricultural-alliance. According to this theory, these four communities are most strongest communities of India and if united could be a strong factor for deciding the election results of India.

The theory was later used by Chaudhary Charan Singh in the 1970s as a part of his Kisan-Politics to break the monopoly of Indian National Congress in Uttar Pradesh. He subscribed to the theory that these four communities: Ahirs, Jats, Gujjars and Rajputs should stay united.

== Aims and objectives ==
The backward castes are prosperous throughout the state of Uttar Pradesh and constitute the mid-strata of the village social structure. At present, the Panchayati raj, has decided that marriages between these castes would not be considered as inter caste marriage. It's being promoted as single entity AJGAR. This theory of AJGAR emerged to gain political power in the state.

== Political outcome ==
In Western Uttar Pradesh, the wealth and power of AJGAR alliance increased during the Green Revolution period, but the AJGAR formula failed to gain widespread support. However, later in 1989, the leader V. P. Singh used the AJGAR cluster successfully to conjoin the Other Backward Classes and Rajputs.

== See also ==
- Triveni Sangh
- KHAM theory
