= K. C. Tyagi =

Indian politician

- K. C. Tyagi in 2023

Parliamentary Board Chairman of Rashtriya Lok Dal
- Incumbent
- Assumed office 30th June 2026
- Appointed by: Jayant Chaudhary

Member of Parliament, Rajya Sabha
- In office 7 February 2013 – 7 July 2016
- Constituency: Bihar

Member of Parliament, Lok Sabha
- In office 1989–1991
- Constituency: Hapur

Personal details
- Born: Kishan Chand Tyagi; 10 December 1950 (age 75) Ghaziabad, Uttar Pradesh, India
- Party: Rashtriya Lok Dal
- Spouse: Pushpa Tyagi
- Children: 3, including Amrish Tyagi
- Education: Meerut University
- Occupation: Politician
- Profession: Politician

Kishan Chand Tyagi (born 10 December 1950) is an Indian politician and former Member of Parliament in both the Lok Sabha and Rajya Sabha, representing the Rashtriya Lok Dal. He served as the Chief General Secretary and National Spokesperson of the party the Janata Dal (United) before joining RLD in March 2026, and was the Chairman of the Parliamentary Standing Committee on Industry during his Rajya sabha term.

On 2 July 2026; he was appointed as the Parliamentary board Chairman of the Rashtriya Lok Dal.

He represented Hapur in the Ninth Lok Sabha (1989-1991) and was a Rajya Sabha member from Bihar from 2013 to 2016. He has also served as Chairman of the Committee on Papers Laid on the Table during his tenure as a Lok Sabha Parliamentarian and also served as the Chairman of the Central Warehousing Corporation undertaken by Government of India.

== Early life ==
Kishan Chand Tyagi was born in a farming family in the village of Morta in the Ghaziabad district of Uttar Pradesh. His father was Jagram Singh Tyagi and his mother was Rohtash Tyagi. He completed his schooling in Muradnagar and earned a B.Sc. degree from Meerut University.

== Personal life ==
He is married to Pushpa Tyagi and has three sons

== Elections ==
K. C. Tyagi has contested several parliamentary elections and served in both houses of Parliament.

Period	Constituency	House	Party	Votes	%	Result	Ref
1984	Hapur	Lok Sabha	LKD	104,147	22.98%	Lost	
1989–1991	Hapur	Lok Sabha	JD	247,187	47.44%	Won	
1991	Hapur	Lok Sabha	JD	166,516	30.86%	Lost	
1996	Hapur	Lok Sabha	SP	153,320	22.47%	Lost	
2004	Meerut	Lok Sabha	JD(U)	167,221	24.0%	Lost	
2013–2016	Bihar (by-election)	Rajya Sabha	JD(U)	–	–	Won	

- Note: Tyagi won the Rajya Sabha by-poll from Bihar following the resignation of Upendra Kushwaha in January 2013.

Political offices
Preceded by Position established	National Chief Spokesperson; 22 May 2023 – 1 September 2024	Succeeded by Rajeev Ranjan
