= Atul Garg =

Indian politician

Member of Parliament, Lok Sabha
- Incumbent
- Assumed office 4 June 2024
- Preceded by: V. K. Singh
- Constituency: Ghaziabad

MoS, Ministry of Fertiliser Supply, Rent Control, Consumer Protection and Food Security, Government of Uttar Pradesh
- In office 21 August 2019 – 25 March 2022
- Chief Minister: Yogi Adityanath

MoS, Ministry of Medical and Health, Family Welfare Maternal and Child Welfare Department, Government of Uttar Pradesh
- In office 19 March 2017 – 21 August 2019
- Chief Minister: Yogi Adityanath

Member of the Uttar Pradesh legislative assembly
- In office 11 March 2017 – 4 June 2024
- Preceded by: Suresh Bansal
- Succeeded by: Vacant
- Constituency: Ghaziabad

Personal details
- Born: 26 August 1957 (age 68) Ghaziabad, Uttar Pradesh, India
- Party: Bharatiya Janata Party
- Relations: Dinesh Chandra Garg (Father)
- Education: B. Com.
- Website: https://www.atulgarg.in/

Atul Garg (born 26 August 1957; Hindi pronunciation: [ət̪ʊl gəɾg]) is an Indian politician from Ghaziabad who is currently serving as Member of Parliament, Lok Sabha. He was a Minister of State in the Government of Uttar Pradesh. He was a Member of the Uttar Pradesh Legislative Assembly, representing the Ghaziabad Assembly constituency.

== Political career ==
Garg is a member of the Bharatiya Janata Party. He campaigned for the Uttar Pradesh legislative assembly elections in 2012 without winning a seat, but following the 2017 election he joined the assembly. He is a Minister of State responsible for food and civil supplies, food safety, rent control, and consumer protection.

== Background ==
Garg is the son of Dinesh Chandra Garg, the first mayor of Ghaziabad.

Garg is a promoter of Entrepreneurship Education in Engineering & Management Colleges in Uttar Pradesh. Through various colleges, he has been promoting trainings in entrepreneurship and skill development.
