= Ghaziabad =

- Metropolis
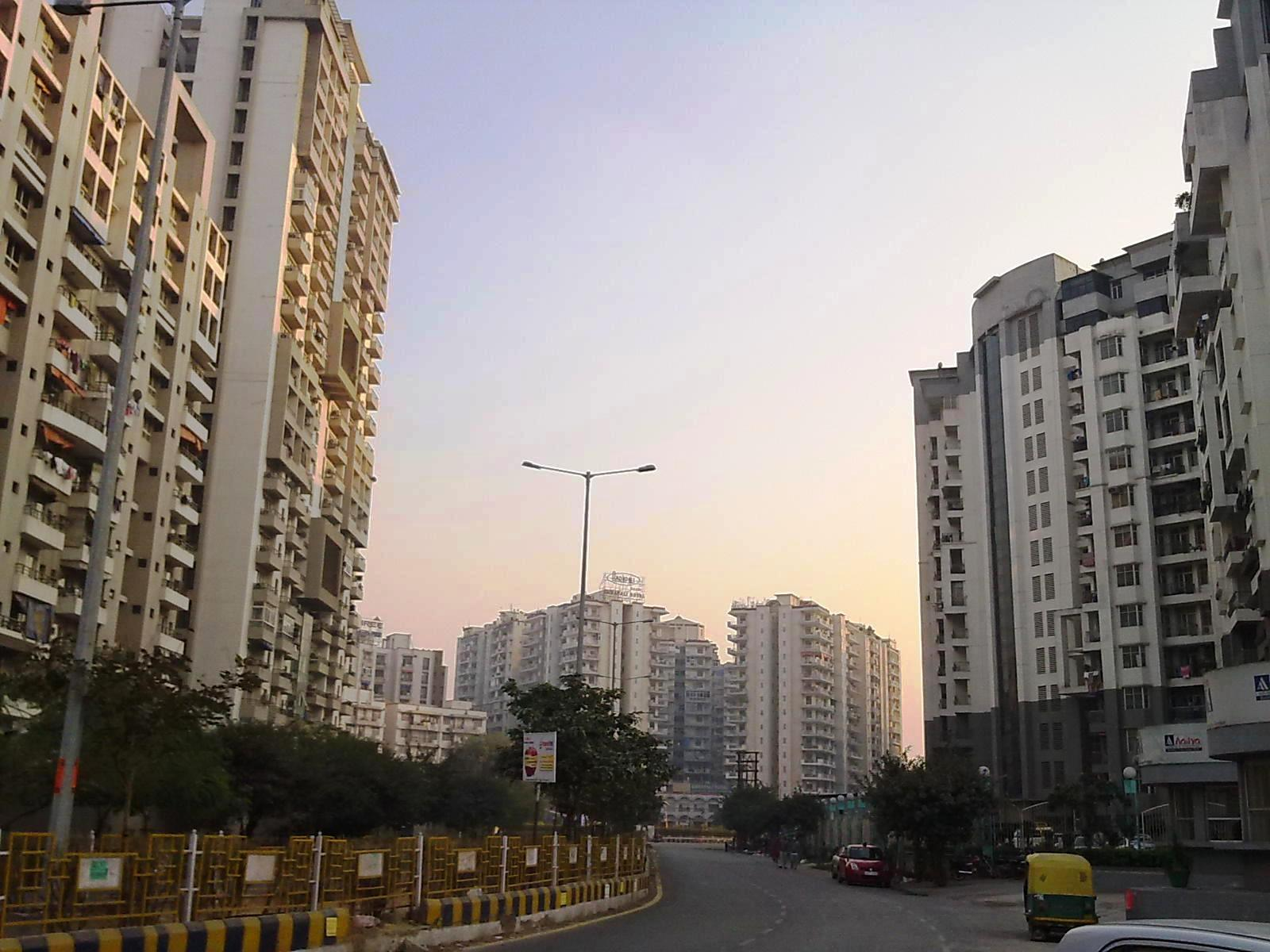
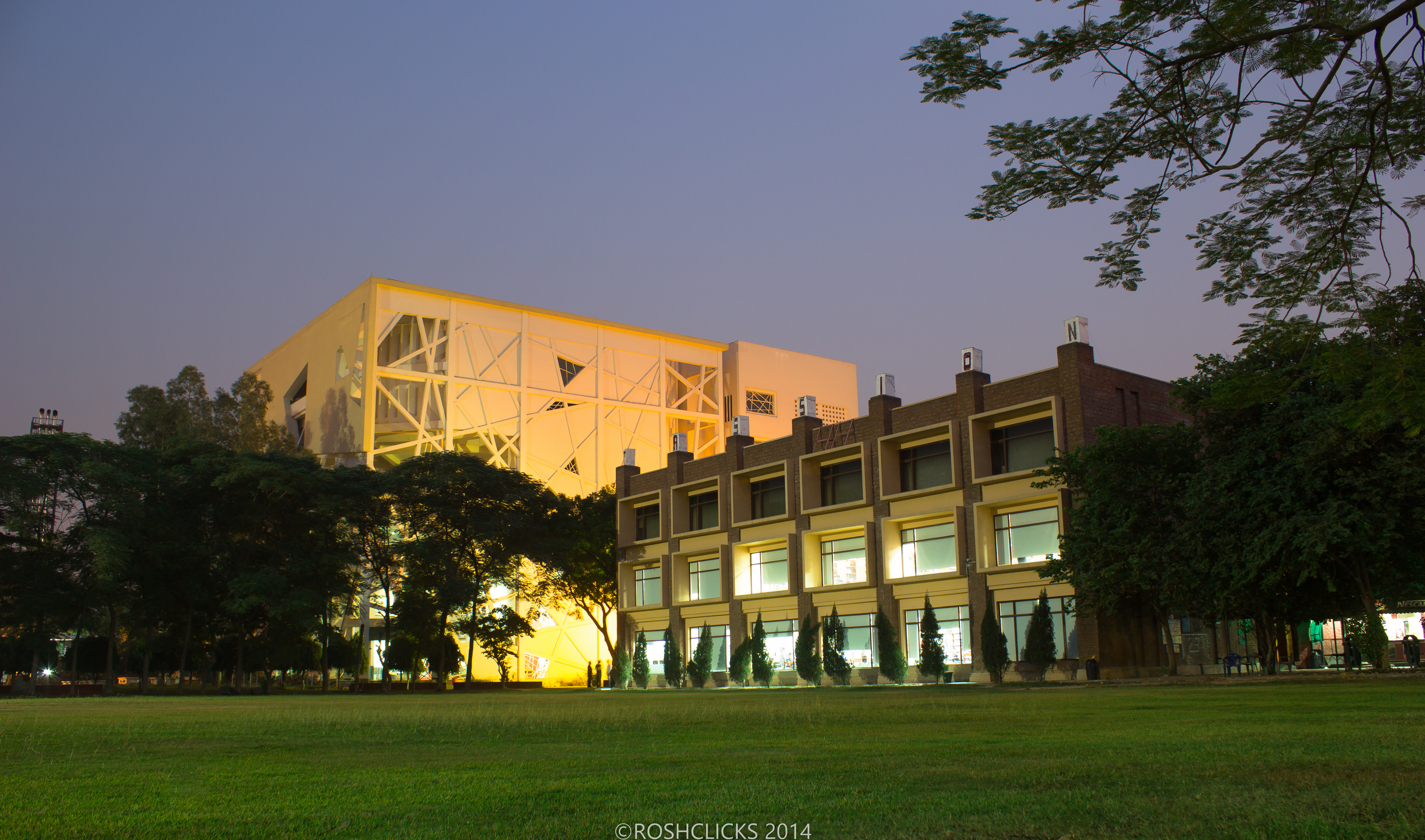
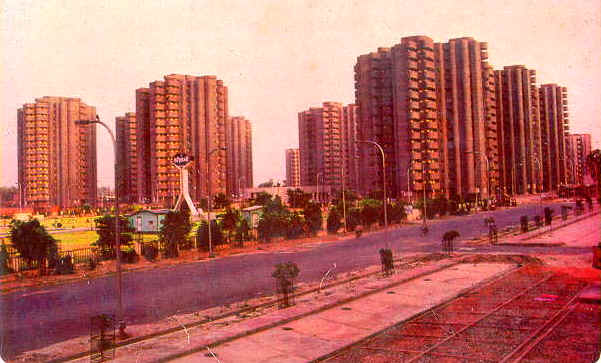
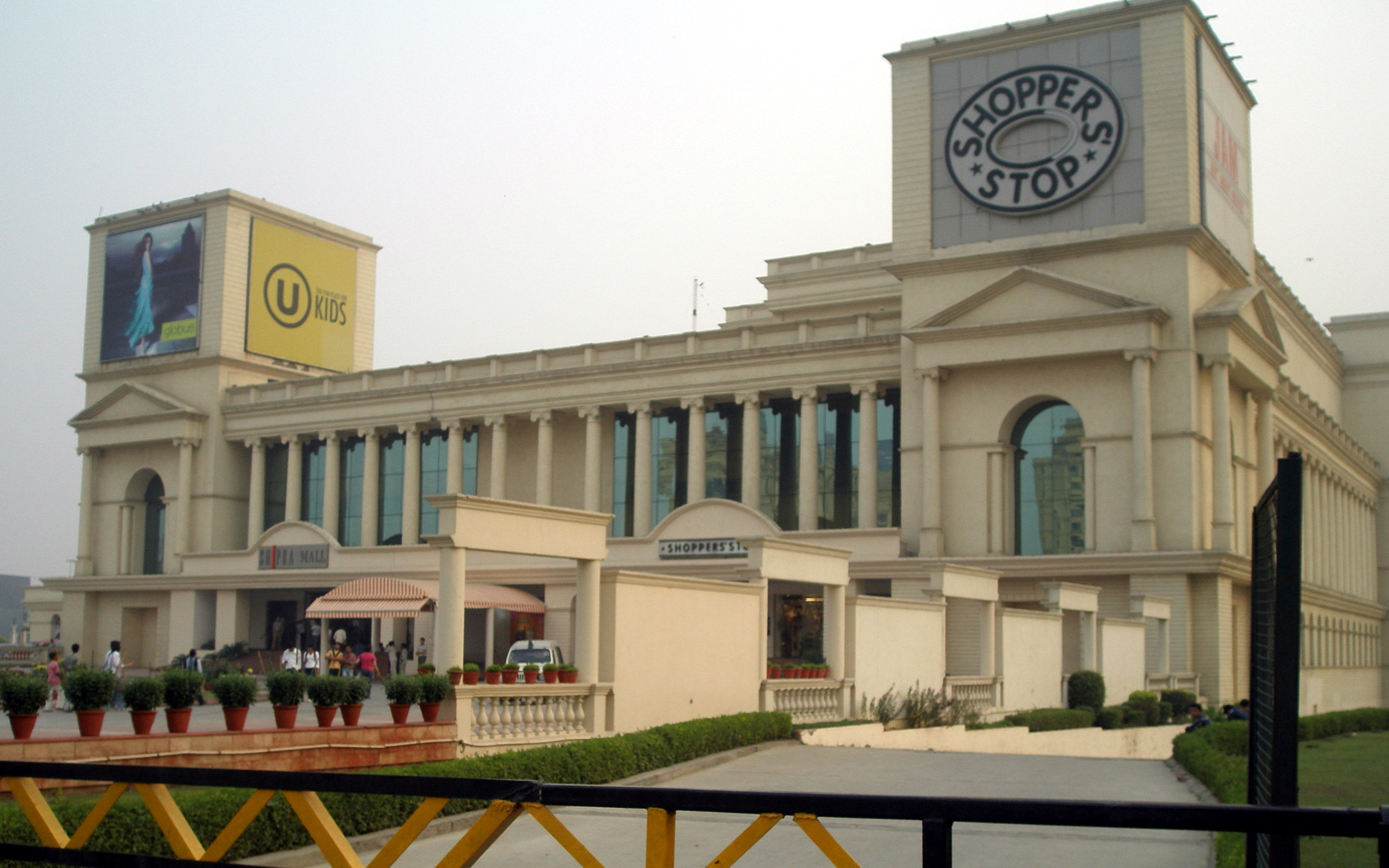
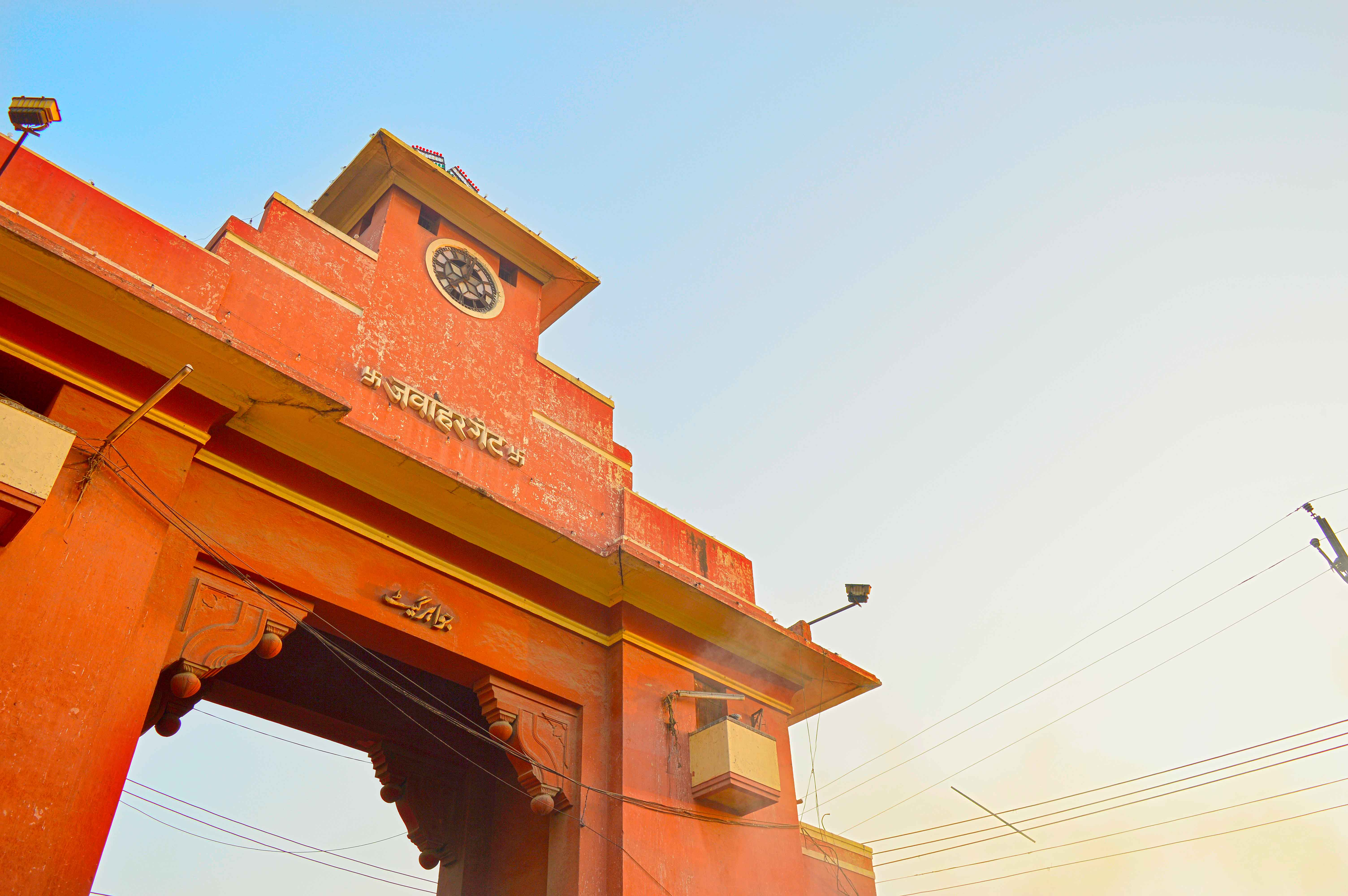
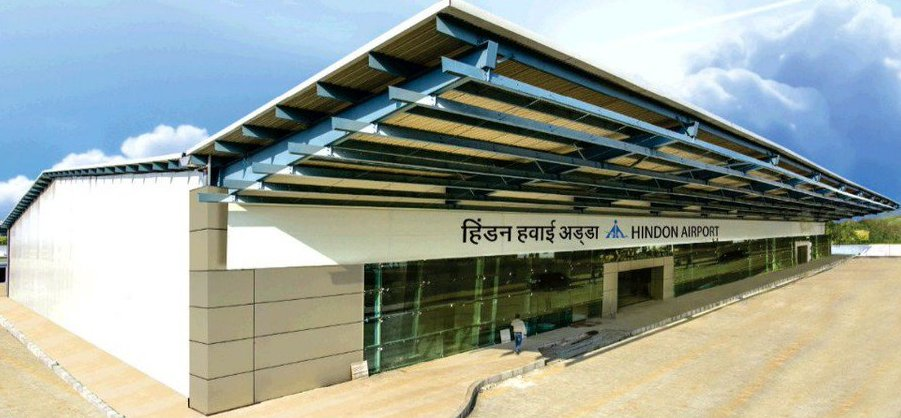
- Clockwise from Top: Indirapuram Skyline, Kaushambi Skyline, Clock House, Hindon Airport, Shipra Mall and Institute of Management Technology
- Nickname: Gateway of Uttar Pradesh
- Location within Uttar Pradesh Location within India Location within Asia
- Coordinates: 28.67°N 77.42°E
- Country: India
- State: Uttar Pradesh
- Division: Meerut
- District: Ghaziabad

Government
  - Type: Municipal Corporation
  - Body: Ghaziabad Municipal Corporation
  - Mayor: Sunita Dayal (BJP)
  - Municipal Commissioner: Nitin Gaur, IAS

Area
  - Total: 210 km^{2} (81 sq mi)

Population (2011)
  - Total: 1,729,000
  - Density: 8,200/km^{2} (21,000/sq mi)
- Demonym: Ghaziabadi

Languages
  - Official: Hindi
  - Native: Khariboli
- Time zone: UTC+5:30 (IST)
- PIN: 201 XXX
- Telephone code: 91-120
- Vehicle registration: UP-14
- Website: ghaziabad.nic.in

Ghaziabad (Hindustani: [ɣaːziːaːbaːd̪]) is a city in the Indian state of Uttar Pradesh and a part of Delhi NCR. It is the administrative headquarters of Ghaziabad district and is the largest city in Western Uttar Pradesh, with a population of 1,729,000. Ghaziabad Municipal Corporation is divided into 5 zones - City Zone, Kavi Nagar Zone, Vijay Nagar Zone, Mohan Nagar Zone and Vasundhara Zone. The Municipal Corporation comprises 100 wards. Well connected by roads and railways, it is a major rail junction for North India. It is part of the Meerut Division of Uttar Pradesh.

It is sometimes referred to as the "Gateway of Uttar Pradesh" because it is close to Delhi, on the main route into Uttar Pradesh. Recent construction work has led to the city being described by a City Mayors Foundation survey as the second fastest-growing in the world. Situated in the Upper Gangetic Plains, the city has two major divisions separated by the Hindon River, namely Trans-Hindon on the west and Cis-Hindon on the east.

== History ==
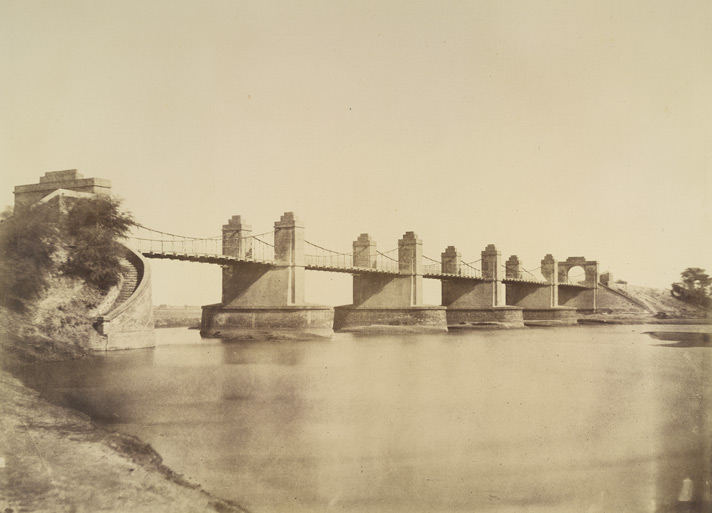
A photograph of the Hindan Bridge taken in 1858 by Major Robert Christopher Tytler and his wife, Harriet. The Hindon River was the scene of a battle between the British and the Indian rebels in May 1857.

The city of Ghaziabad was founded in 1740 A.D. by Ghazi-ud-Din II, who served as a wazir in the court of Mughal emperor Muhammad Shah, and named it as "Ghaziuddinnagar" after his own name. The name "Ghaziuddinnagar" was shortened to its present form, i.e. "Ghaziabad" with the opening of the Railways in 1864. During the Mughal period, Ghaziabad and especially the banks of the Hindon in Ghaziabad, remained a picnic spot for the Mughal royal family.

Establishment of the Scientific Society here, during the same period is considered as a milestone of the educational movement launched by Syed Ahmad Khan. The Scinde, Punjab & Delhi Railway, connecting Delhi and Lahore, up until Ambala through Ghaziabad was opened in the same year. With the completion of the Amritsar-Saharanpur-Ghaziabad line of the Sind, Punjab and Delhi Railway in 1870, Delhi was connected to Multan through Ghaziabad, and Ghaziabad became the junction of the East Indian Railway and Sind, Punjab and Delhi Railway.

Ghaziabad, along with Meerut and Bulandshahr, remained one of the three Munsifis of the District, under the Meerut Civil Judgeship during most periods of the British Raj.

Ghaziabad was associated with the Indian independence movement from the Indian Rebellion of 1857.

Ghaziabad was part of Meerut district, it became a new district on 14 November 1976 by then chief minister N.D. Tiwari.

== Demographics ==
=== Population ===
The provisional data derived from the 2011 census shows that Ghaziabad urban agglomeration had a population of 2,358,525, of which males were 1,256,783 and females were 1,101,742. According to official website of Ghaziabad, the population of Ghaziabad is 34,06,061 with 18,60,400 males and 16,60,412 females as of January 24, 2025 . The city is located in the state of Uttar Pradesh and is the largest city in western Uttar Pradesh. The literacy rate was 98.81%. Ghaziabad is a subcategory B1 district of category B i.e. having socioeconomic parameters below the national average. It is the second largest industrial city in Uttar Pradesh after Kanpur.

Religions in Ghaziabad (2011)
Religion	Percent
Hinduism	82.50%
Islam	14.18%
Sikhism	0.96%
Christianity	0.78%
Jainism	0.71%
Other or not stated	0.87%
Distribution of religions

According to the final data, Ghaziabad Municipal Corporation had a population of 1,648,643 and a sex ratio of 885 females per 1000 males. Ghaziabad had a literacy rate of 84.78%. 12.67% of the population was under the age of 6. Scheduled Castes and Scheduled Tribes made up 13.68% and 0.18% of the population respectively.

Languages in Ghaziabad (2011)
1. Hindi (94.2%)
2. Urdu (1.52%)
3. Punjabi (1.06%)
4. Others (3.18%)

Hindi is the most spoken language. Other languages such as Urdu and Punjabi, are spoken by a minority. There is a smattering of speakers of other languages due to Ghaziabad's position in the Delhi metro area.

== Government and politics ==
Ghaziabad city is governed by the Ghaziabad Municipal Corporation under the Uttar Pradesh Municipal Corporation Act, 1959. Ghaziabad city is spread over 210 km^{2} (81 sq mi) of municipal area. It upgraded from a Municipal Board to a Municipal Corporation on 31 August 1994, following the 74th Constitutional Amendment Act. Ghaziabad Municipal Corporation (or Nagar Nigam Ghaziabad) is divided into 5 zones - City Zone, Kavi Nagar Zone, Vijay Nagar Zone, Mohan Nagar Zone and Vasundhara Zone. The Municipal Corporation comprises 100 wards, with councillors elected from each ward. The local elections to all wards was last held in 2023. The executive head is Vikramaditya Singh Malik, the current Municipal Commissioner while the elected head is the Mayor, Sunita dayal from the BJP. In 2022, Assembly Election Atul Garg, Bhartiya Janta Party candidate won the election.

The municipality has the following departments: Swachh Bharat Mission, Public Works Dept, I.T Dept, Property Tax Dept, Health Dept, Street Light Dept, Water Works Dept, Law, Garden/Horticulture. It has an executive committee composed of businessmen.

=== Representation in state assembly ===
The city is represented in the Lok Sabha through one MP elected from the Lok Sabha constituency represented by BJP's Atul Garg elected in 2024. and one MLA elected from the Vidhan Sabha constituency, represented by BJP's Atul Garg elected in 2017.

=== Law and order ===
In January 2020, it was announced that the police commissionerate system was likely to be introduced in Ghaziabad in phases. The city police is under the state home department and is headed by Senior Superintendent of Police for the district.

=== Development ===
The Ghaziabad Development Authority (GDA), established 1977, is responsible for planning, development and construction of housing projects, commercial lands, land management and infrastructure.

The Uttar Pradesh New and Renewable Energy Development Agency (UPNEDA) announced plans to develop Ghaziabad as the next solar city in the state after Ayodhya. The city is expected to meet 10% of its electricity demand with solar power by 2027. Out of the targeted 22 GW power generation capacity under the plan, 6 GW is planned from rooftop solar systems.

=== Civic utilities ===
Nagar Nigam Ghaziabad looks after the civic activities of the city. Other development agencies of the city include the Ghaziabad Development Authority, and the UP Jal Nigam. The master plan for the city is laid by the Town & Country Planning Department, Uttar Pradesh, which is department under the Department of Housing and Urban Planning for the state.

The corporation supplies water and has nearly 2.35 lakh water connections, supplying nearly 388 MLD of water per day. The city also receives water from the Ganga through 50 cusec (one cubic foot of water flow per second which translates into 28.32 litres) and 100 cusec plants but a lot of areas in the city constituting multi-storied apartments do not receive Ganga water and rely on groundwater. Treated water is supplied to only 36.2% of households.

The municipality, as well as UP Jal Nigam sets up sewage treatment plants and water treatment plants for the city. The Ghaziabad Development Authority is responsible for laying networks of sewer lines and piped drinking water supply. Drinking water remains a concern with 55.6% of households accessing it from tube wells, bore wells and hand pumps. Only 30.5% households are connected to piped sewer lines.

As of 2019, Ghaziabad generates 1,000 metric tonnes of waste daily, some of which is sent to Meerut, while 300 metric tonnes are sent to Pilkhuwa, while almost 200 metric tons is used in various GMC owned parks to create compost. The corporation also dumps garbage in Indirapuram landfill site, and would dump it in Pratap Vihar landfill until they stopped on the orders of a National Green Tribunal committee. The corporation also announced in September 2020 that it was creating 10 'garbage factories' as a permanent solution to the city's waste problem.

=== Municipal finance ===
As per the Ministry of Housing and Urban Affairs, the Ghaziabad Municipal Corporation reported a revenue of ₹665 crore (US$80 million) and an expenditure of ₹480 crore (US$58 million) in 2022–23. Taxes contributed to 31.6% of the revenue, while the corporation received ₹429 crore in grants during the year.

== Economy ==
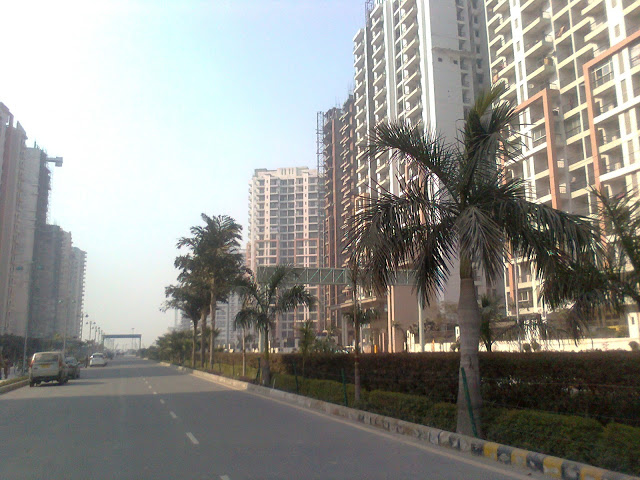
Residential apartments near Vaishali metro station, Ghaziabad

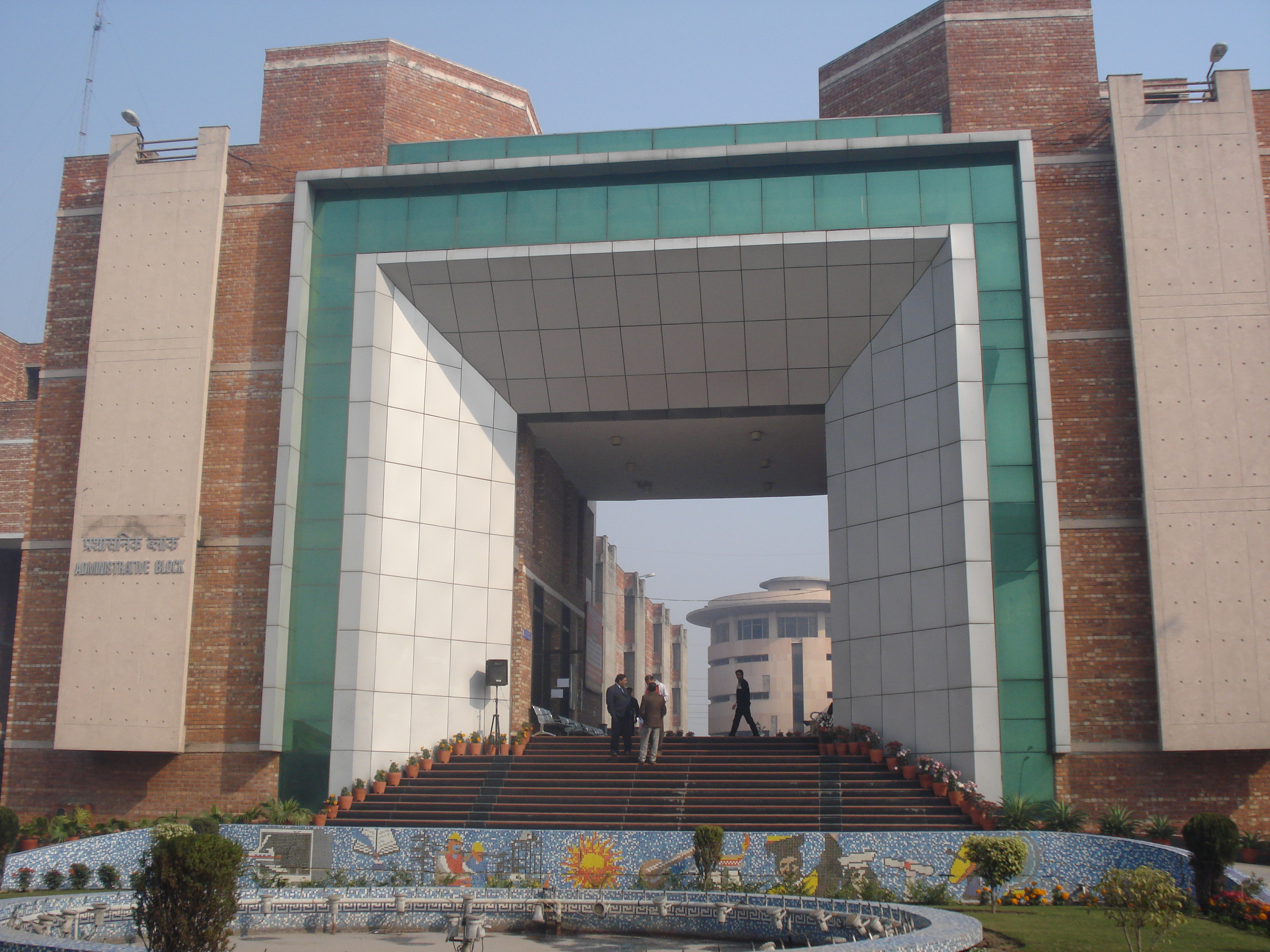
MAIT Administrative Block in Ghaziabad.

Although connected by railway since 1865, it was not until 1940 that the first modern industry appeared in Ghaziabad. However, it was in the post-independence period that industry really expanded, with a further 22 factories opening in the four years after 1947. This development can be attributed to the influx of people from the newly formed Pakistan and the relocation of businesses from what was now the Pakistani province of Punjab. John Oakey and Mohan Ltd., one of India's largest concerns manufacturing coated and bonded abrasives, and originally functioning under the name of 'National Abrasives' at Rawalpindi was shifted here under the proprietorship of 'Dyer Meakins' in 1947. Subsequently, the Mohan Meakin breweries were also set up in 1949. This period also saw the development of Ghaziabad as one of India's most famous centres of the Oil Engines industry.

In 1967, the municipal limits were extended up to the Delhi-UP border. Starting in the early 1970s, many steel-manufacturing units also came up in the city making it one of the primary industries of the city. This period also saw the emergence of the Electronics industry, with the setting up of Bharat Electronics Limited and Central Electronics Limited Over the years, planned Industrial development saw participation from major industrial houses of the country including Mohans (Mohan Nagar Industrial Estate, 1949), Tatas (Tata Oil Mills), Modis (Modinagar, 1933; International Tobacco Co. 1967), Shri Rams (Shri Ram Pistons, 1964), Jaipurias etc. and also significant participation through foreign capital in concerns such as Danfoss India Ltd. (estd. 1968); Indo- Bulgar Food Ltd. and International Tobacco Company (estd. 1967).

== Transportation ==
=== Road ===
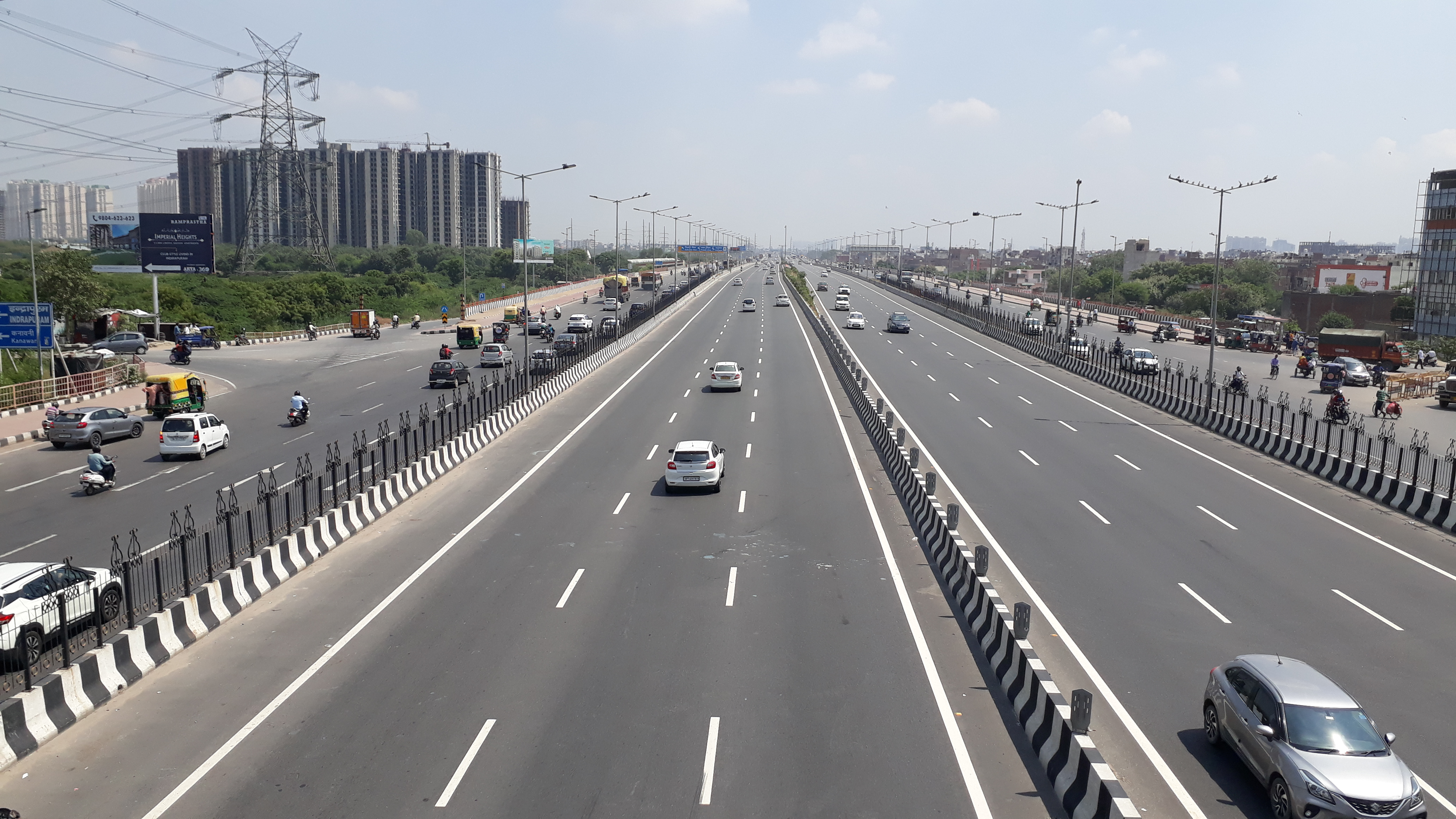
Delhi–Meerut Expressway connects Ghaziabad with Delhi and Meerut.

A proposal has been made to widen National Highway 24 (NH-24) from four to fourteen lanes on the stretch between the Ghaziabad-Delhi border and Dasna. Many residential and commercial projects are being built along the highway.

=== Rail ===
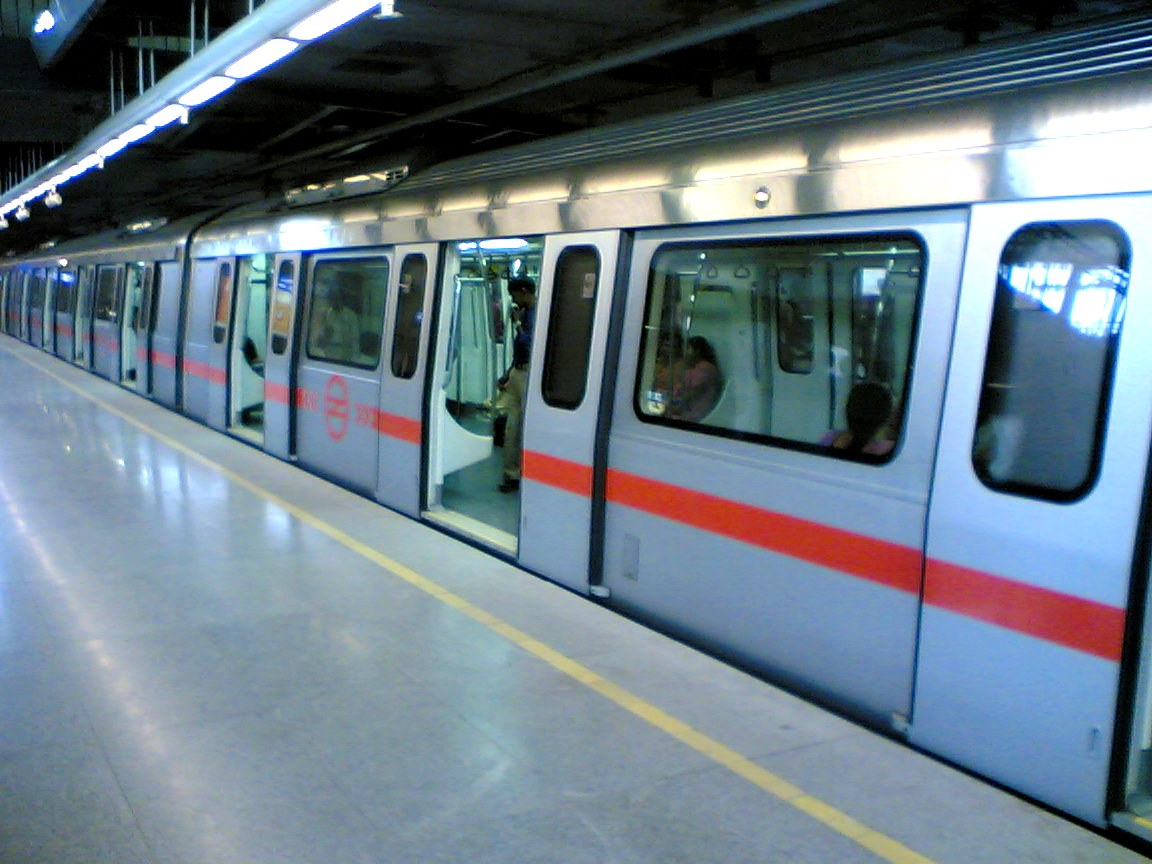
The Blue, Red and Pink lines of Delhi Metro serve Ghaziabad

The Blue, Red and Pink lines of Delhi Metro serve Ghaziabad and connect it with Delhi. The Red Line has 8 stations in the city, with its eastern terminus Shaheed Sthal (New Bus Adda) being located here. The Blue Line has 2 stations in Ghaziabad, viz., Kaushambi, which serves the area of Kaushambi, and Vaishali, which serves the areas of Vaishali, Vasundhara and Indirapuram. Pink line also has 2 stations in Loni, Ghaziabad, viz., Johri Enclave and Shiv Vihar.

The main railway station in the city is Ghaziabad Junction, which, as per the categorization of Indian Railway stations by commercial importance, has been ranked NSG-2. The station has been operating since 1864 and is an important one on the Delhi-Howrah line. It is spread across 150,000 square metres (37 acres) and has a daily footfall of 50,000 passengers.

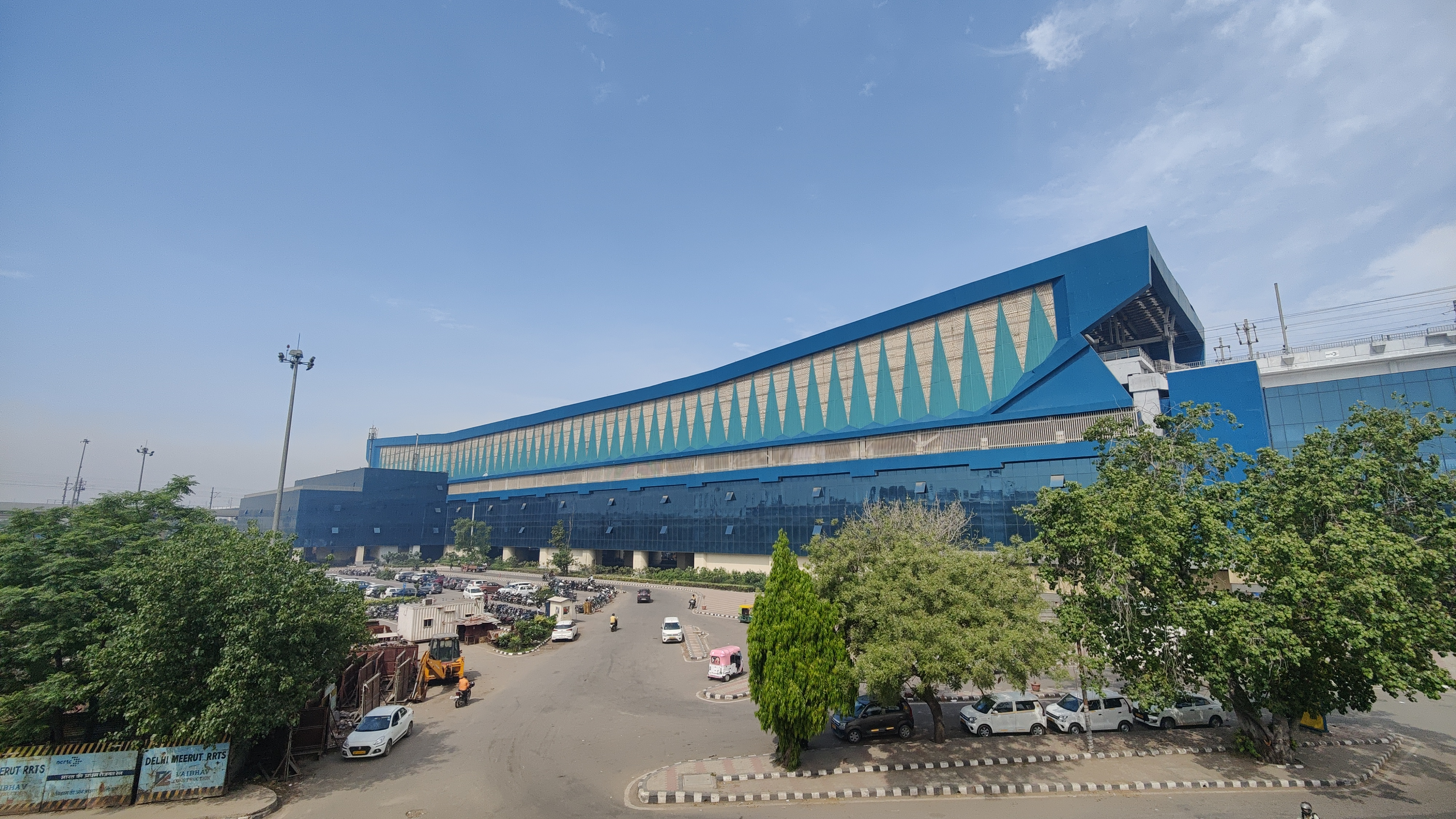
Ghaziabad RRTS station

The Delhi–Meerut RRTS is an 82.15 km (51.05 mi) semi-high speed rail connecting Delhi, Ghaziabad, and Meerut. It is partly operational, with its priority section from Sahibabad to Duhai opened to public on 20 October 2023.

=== Air ===
Hindon Airport is an airport serving Ghaziabad and has been operational since 2019. It is the second commercial airport in the Delhi–NCR after Indira Gandhi International Airport. The airport was inaugurated by the Prime Minister of India Narendra Modi on 8 March 2019. The Indira Gandhi International Airport is the closest international airport. Hindon Airport currently operates flights to Pithoragarh, Uttarakhand, and Hubli, Karnataka. A new airport in Noida is being built to relieve congestion at IGI coming from Ghaziabad and other cities inside NCR

Ghaziabad has been ranked 18th best “National Clean Air City” (under Category 1 >10L Population cities) in India according to 'Swachh Vayu Survekshan 2024 Results'.

== Education ==
Ghaziabad has also emerged as one of the major educational destinations with many higher education colleges and institutes operating in the city. Some of the main institutes are:

- Christ University Delhi NCR Campus
- Dr. A. P. J. Abdul Kalam Technical University, Lucknow
- Institute of Management Technology (IMT)
- Raj Kumar Goel Institute of Technology
- Santosh Medical College

== Notable people ==
=== Arts, entertainment and television ===
- Lara Dutta, Miss Universe 2000 and Bollywood actress
- Luv Ranjan, Indian film and music director, writer, lyricist and producer who works in Hindi cinema

=== Business ===
- Nikesh Arora, businessman, former president and COO of SoftBank Corp. and CEO of SoftBank Internet and Media, Inc
- Kapil Mohan, businessman

=== Politics and government ===
- Suresh Bansal, politician
- Madan Bhaiya, politician
- Roop Chaudhary, politician
- Arvind Kejriwal, politician
- Rama Pilot, politician
- Rajnath Singh, politician
- General V. K. Singh (Retd.), politician
- K. C. Tyagi, politician
- Ram Chandra Vikal, freedom fighter and deputy Chief Minister of UP

=== Sports ===
- Rajkumar Baisla, Dhayanchand Awardee 2011 (Wrestling)
- Donald Crowhurst, sailor
- Anshul Gupta, cricketer
- Manoj Prabhakar, cricketer
- Suresh Raina, cricketer
- Jaya Sharma, cricketer
- Kunal Lal, cricketer
- Rahul Yadav, cricketer
