= Modi (surname) =

Modi, alternatively spelled Mody, is a surname in India, most commonly found among people from the states of Rajasthan, Gujarat, Bihar, Chhattisgarh, Haryana, Madhya Pradesh, Jharkhand, and Uttar Pradesh. The surname Modi doesn't belong to any particular community, and is distributed among various religions, including Hindus, Jains, Muslims and Parsis.

Modi or Mody is also an unrelated Nigerien surname, and an unrelated Serer and Bambara first name (sometimes spelt Moodi or Moody in Serer) – found amongst the Serer community of Senegal and the Gambia (the Senegambia region), and the Bambara community of Mali and the Senegambia, in West Africa. In Bambara, Modi or Mody is derived from the name Modibo, which means "master" or "teacher". The name is thus synonymous with wisdom and knowledge as a first name in West Africa, particularly in the Senegambia region, especially those Senegambian tribes with a long history of resisting Islamization like the Serer, and to some extent, the Bambara. It should not be confused with the Wolof corruption of the Arabic name Muhammadou, Wolofized to Modou.

== List ==
Notable people with the surname (or first or name) include:

- Akash Modi (born 1995), American gymnast
- Aman Lal Modi, Indian politician
- Anju Modi, Indian costume designer
- Anny Modi, Congolese feminist
- Ashoka Mody (born 1956), Indian-American economist
- Asit Kumarr Modi (born 1966), founder and director of Neela Tele Films
- Avani Modi, Indian model and actress
- Bhupendra Kumar Modi (born 1949), chairman of Spice Global
- Charu Modi, Indian busninswoman, granddaughter of Gujarmal Modi
- Chinu Modi (1939–2017), Indian poet
- Dayawati Modi (1915–1996), wife of Gujarmal Modi
- Edmund Mody (1495–1552), English soldier and politician
- Gujarmal Modi (1902–1976), Indian industrialist and philanthropist, founder of Modinagar
- Hirji Vacha Modi, Indian businessman
- Hitesh Modi (born 1971), Kenyan cricketer
- Homi Mody (1881–1969), Parsi businessman
- Hormusjee Naorojee Mody (1838–1911), Indian businessman
- Indravadan Modi (born 1926), an Indian pharmaceutical industry pioneer
- Ishwar Modi (born 1940), an Indian sociologist
- Jashodaben Modi (born 1952), wife of Narendra Modi
- Jivanji Jamshedji Modi (1854–1933), Indian Zoroastrian priest
- Kal Penn (born 1977), stage name of Kalpen Suresh Modi, American actor
- Karishma Modi (born 1980), an Indian model and actress
- Krishan Kumar Modi (born 1940), Indian businessman, son of Gujarmal Modi
- Lalit Modi, Chief Commissioner of the Indian Premier League
- Laura Modi, Irish-American businesswoman
- Manhar Modi, Indian poet
- Mukesh Modi Indian filmmaker
- Murugappa Channaveerappa Modi (1916–2005), the Indian eye surgeon
- Narendra Modi, Prime Minister of India
- Neena Modi, British physician
- Nirav Modi, Indian fugitive jeweller and diamantaire
- Noshir Mody, Indian-American composer
- Piloo Mody, Indian architect and politician and one of the founding members of the Swatantra Party
- Pramod Chandra Mody, Indian bureaucrat
- Prem Prakash Modi (born 1968), Indian filmmaker
- Purnesh Modi, Indian politician
- Raj Modi (born 1959), Zimbabwean politician
- Ramlal Chunilal Modi, Indian historian
- Rusi Modi, Indian cricketer
- Russi Mody (1918–2014), Indian businessman
- Salifou Modi, Nigerien general, ambassador, and coupist
- Samir Modi (born 1969), Indian entrepreneur
- Sandeep Modi (born 1982), Indian filmmaker
- Seema Mody, Indian journalist
- Shrikrishan Modi, Indian politician
- Sohrab Modi, Indian actor
- Subhash Modi (born 1946), Kenyan cricket umpire
- Sulochana Modi, Indian politician
- Suresh Modi, Indian politician
- Sushil Kumar Modi, Indian politician
- Syed Modi, Indian badminton singles player.
- Virali Modi (born 1991), disability rights activist
- Vishnu Kumar Modi, Indian politician
- William Mody (1524–1558), English politician
- Yogesh Chander Modi, Indian police officer
- Zia Mody, Indian lawyer
