= Ishwar (name) =

Ishwar is a South Asian name.

Notable people with the name include:

- Ishwar Ballav (1937–2008), Nepali poet
- Ishwar Chaudhary (born 1988), Indian cricketer
- Ishwar Dass Dhiman (1934–2016), Indian politician
- Ishwar Chandra Gupta (1812–1859), Indian Bengali poet and writer
- Ishwar C. Harris (born 1943), Indian scholar of religion
- Ishwar Das Jalan, Indian politician
- Ishwar Maraj (born 1969), Trinidadian-Canadian cricketer
- Ishwar Dayal Mishra, Nepalese politician
- Ishwar Modi (born 1940), Indian sociologist
- Ishwar Chand Nanda (1892–1965), Indian dramatist
- Ishwar Pandey (born 1989), Indian cricketer
- Ishwar Petlikar (1916–1983), Indian Gujarati-language author and journalist
- Ishwar Pokhrel (born 1954), Nepalese leader of the Communist Party of Nepal
- Ishwar Puri (born 1959), Indian-born scientist, engineer, and academic who has worked in the United States and Canada
- Ishwar Bahadur Rijal, Nepalese politician
- Ishwar Das Rohani (1946–2013), Indian politician
- Ishwar Sahu (born 1981), Indian politician
- Ishwar Chandra Shukla (1948–2019), Indian politician
- Ishwar Singh (politician, born 1950) (born 1950), Indian politician
- Ishwar Singh (politician, born 1926) (1926–1998), Indian politician
- Ishwar Dayal Swami (1929–2019), Indian politician
- Ishwar Das Varshnei (died 1948), Indian glass worker and industrialist
- Ishwar Chandra Vidyasagar (1820–1891), Indian Bengali polymath
- Chaudhary Ishwar Singh, Indian politician

== Surname ==
- Reeta Ishwar, Pakistani politician

== Fictional Characters ==
- Ishwar, a character from the Indian television series, Jeevan Saathi – Humsafar Zindagi Ke
- Ishwar Acharya, a character from the 1982 Indian Bollywood romance drama film, Bheegi Palkein
- Ishwar Chandra, main character in 2005 Indian Hindi-language drama film, Waqt: The Race Against Time
- Ishwar Singh, a character from the 2019 Indian sports film, Penalty

== See also ==
- Ishwar Gupta Setu, a bridge that crosses the Hooghly River in West Bengal, India
- Ishvara
