= Bhupendra Kumar Modi =

Singaporean businessman

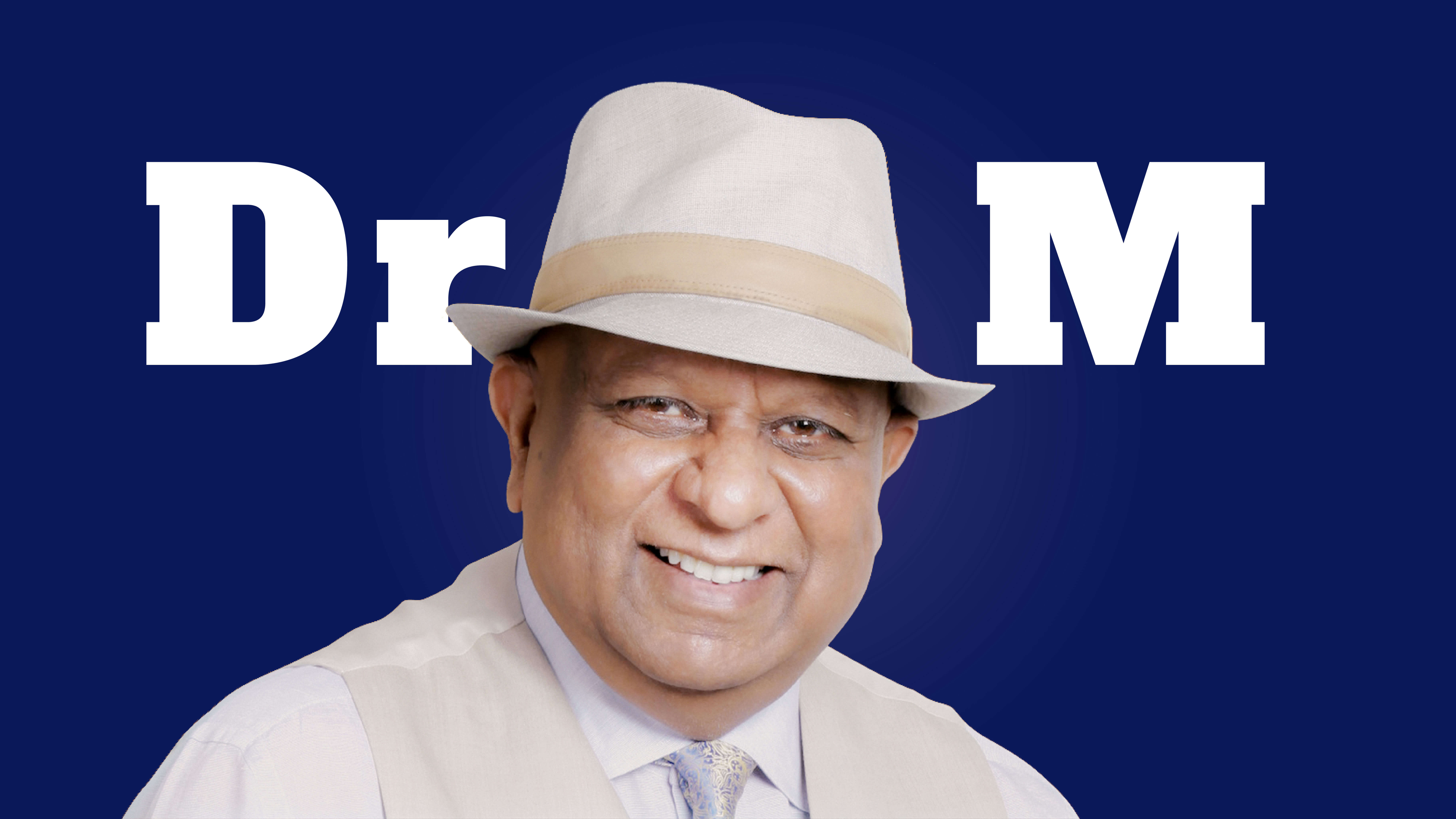
- Modi in 2021
- Born: January 2, 1949 (age 77); Modinagar, United Provinces, India
- Education: Indian Institute of Technology; University of Southern California
- Title: Founder Chairman: Smart Group; Founder Chairman: Global Citizen Forum; Honorary President: World Federation of United Nations Associations; Global Chairman: Foreign Investors India Forum
- Spouse: Veena Modi
- Children: 3
- Parents: Gujarmal Modi (father); Dayawati Modi (mother)
- Relatives: Krishan Kumar Modi (brother); Charu Modi (niece); Lalit Modi (nephew); Samir Modi (nephew)
- Honours: Entrepreneur of the Year Award (2017) Global Thought Leader for Global Peace Award (2018)
- Website: http://rajarshimodigroup.com/founder/

Bhupendra Kumar Modi (born 2 January 1949), popularly known as Dr. Modi, is a Singaporean businessman, social entrepreneur, and philanthropist. He is the founder-chairman of Smart Group of companies, the founder of the Global Citizen Forum and the global chairman of the Foreign Investors India Forum. He is also the Honorary President of the World Federation of United Nations Associations.

He received the title of Rajarshi from the Shankaracharya of Dwarka Peeth.

== Early life and education ==
Modi is the son of Raibahadur Gujarmal Modi and Dayawati Modi. He graduated with a degree in chemical engineering from the Indian Institute of Technology (IIT-BHU) and received an MBA from the University of Southern California. He has been awarded a PhD. in Financial Management.

== Career ==
In 1975, as a part of Modi Rubber, Modi made the first Indo-International technical collaboration in the tyre industry with Continental of Germany. In 1981, Modi established Graphics India, which became the sole distributor of Rank Xerox copiers in India, and formed Modi Xerox in 1983 as a joint-venture with Xerox, setting up India's first office automation product manufacturing facility in Modipur, Rampur in the Indian state of Uttar Pradesh.

In 1987, Modi formed a joint-venture with Italian computer firm Olivetti. Modi Olivetti was the first Indian joint-venture to manufacture advanced PC's and floppy disks. He also entered into a joint venture with Alcatel in 1992; Alcatel Modi Network Systems was the first Indian private sector company to manufacture telecom equipment and export digital switching systems and to set up a GSM network in India.

In 1993, his company Modi Telstra became the first company to launch cellular services in India and received the first Telecom Engineering Commission Certification of Quality. The inaugural mobile call in India was made on the Modi Telstra network by the then Chief Minister of Kolkata, Jyoti Basu to Sukh Ram, the then Union communications minister, in July 1995.

Later Modi formed Spice Communications, a joint-venture with Telekom-Malaysia (now Axiata) which went on to become the leading telecom operator in Northern and Southern India. In 2000, Modi established Cellebrum (now Spice Digital), a mobile value-added services company for telecom operators. In 2013, Modi established Saket City Hospitals and invested ₹300 crore in it. The hospital has 250 beds. In 2014, Media reported that Saket City Hospitals planned to invest ₹350 crore to expand the hospital's capacity by adding 350 beds by 2016. In 2004, he founded Spice Hotspot, the first Indian mobile retail chain. Spice Mobiles was among the earliest producers of Indian-branded handsets. In June 2008, he exited the telecom business in a deal with Idea Cellular, at that time the fourth largest mergers and acquisitions deal involving an Indian entity.

In 2009, Modi acquired a major stake in i2i, a listed company in Singapore Stock Exchange, renaming it S-i2i, (now SEVAK LTD.),).

In 2013, Modi was included in Singapore's 50 Richest List by Forbes. In the same year, he dropped use of the name 'Spice' in favour of 'Smart'. He also entered into the entertainment industry as co-producer of the film OMG!, and producer of the tele-serial Buddha.

In 2015, Smart Group entered the wellness and healthcare sector, partnering with multiple global wellness groups including the American Academy of Anti-Aging Medicine (A4M), the Global Wellness Institute, and Fountain Life. The group's plans include developing wellness communities, a virtual wellness platform and preventive healthcare centres, such as the Modi Yoga Retreat in Rishikesh, Noida in Uttar Pradesh, and the Smart Metabolic Anti-Aging centre in New Delhi.

SEVAK LTD. has partnered with Uber to operate a fully commercially-owned electric vehicle fleet in Singapore.

Since 2019, Modi has been Global Chairman of the Foreign Investors India Forum (FIIF), an initiative supported by international affiliates and most domestic chambers of commerce to promote foreign investment into India.

== Social philanthropy ==
In January 2013, Modi founded the Global Citizen Forum, a progressive social organisation with the mission statement of creating "One World Beyond Gender, Religion and Nationality". The organisation has held several events around the world, including at the United Nations headquarters in New York City.

== Personal life ==
Modi is married to Veena Modi and they have three children. He became a Singaporean citizen in 2012.

== Filmography ==
=== As co-producer ===
- 2010, No Problem: co-produced with Rajat Rawail and Anil Kapoor
- 2012, OMG – Oh My God!: co-produced with Vikram Malhotra. It won the 'Best Hindi Film Award' by Institute for Research and Documentation in Social Sciences and 'Best Adapted Screenplay' in 60th National Film Awards.

=== As producer ===
- 2013, Buddha is a historical drama based on the life of Buddha that shows how a prince 'Siddhartha', became 'Buddha', aired on Zee TV and Doordarshan.

== Books ==
- Hinduism The Universal Truth (1993)
- Performance — A Manager's Challenge (1995)
- One God (2000)
- India and Hinduism (2002)

== Awards and honours ==
- In 1997, Modi was appointed as chairman of the Cellular Operators Association of India.
- In 2000, Modi was appointed as coordinator for Indian subcontinent for Millennium World Peace Summit by United Nations.
- In 2004, the US House of Representatives issued a proclamation in appreciation of Modi's efforts to promote deeper understanding between the countries and congratulated him on his innovations and humanitarian efforts worldwide.
- 2009, Modi received a commendation from the then Singapore Minister-Mentor Lee Kuan Lew on the occasion of the fifth anniversary of the Lee Kuan Institute of Public Policy.
- In 2013, 'Ambassador of Peace Award' conferred by the Universal Peace Foundation.
- In 2015, 'Lifetime Achievement Luminary Award' by Channel News Asia, Singapore.
- In 2017, 'Entrepreneur of the Year Award' by Singapore Indian Chamber of Commerce.
- In 2018, 'Global Thought Leader for Global Peace Award' by Stardust.
- In 2019, Modi was appointed the Honorary President for World Federation of United Nation Associations.
