= Sanjeeb Mukherjee =

Sanjeeb Mukherjea is an Indian sports Journalist and Cricket Editor of DD Sports and CNN-News18 channel. He has over a decade long experience in the industry having made a mark for himself in investigative journalism.

Mukherjea has to his credit, multiple path breaking stories including the story he broke in 2010 on the Indian Premier League controversy surrounding the ouster of former IPL boss Lalit Modi and the subsequent resignation of Shashi Tharoor, a Member of Parliament representing the Indian National Congress.

He hosts popular cricket shows like 'Kings of Cricket' on television and regularly contributes articles to publications such as Business Standard and Mint.

Mukherjea hails from the city of Kolkata and used to be a radio jockey with Red FM in the early 2000s.

== Awards ==
In 2016, Mukherjea won two major awards, rewarding him for his work in sports broadcast journalism. On 29 June, he won the Best Sports News Show Presenter award at the News Television Awards 2016. Later in November that year, he also bagged the prestigious 'Ramnath Goenka Award for Excellence in Journalism' in the category of Sports.
