= G. K. Sanghar =

Journalist, television personality in Singapore

GK Sanghar
- Born: GK Sanghar; Singapore
- Education: Monash University
- Occupations: Journalist; Television personality

GK Sanghar is a Singaporean entertainment news personality of Indian descent. She is a television presenter, writer and voice-over artist. Born to parents from Malaysia and Singapore respectively, she has resided in many countries since the age of 6. She was raised as a modern Sikh and speaks over 5 languages including Hindi, Punjabi, Malay and Basic Mandarin. Sanghar is popularly known for her work on Zee TV and Toggle TV under the umbrella of MediaCorp.

== Career ==
After graduating from Monash University with a B.A. in Journalism and Communications, her career in the media industry began with Australia's women's lifestyle publication, Cleo. Whilst writing, she tried a hand at emceeing and nabbed the opportunity to host a widely publicized press launch for Singapore's first international music album release, Illamai Jolly Jolly (Tamil: விஜய்) produced by Ashok's Joy Entertainment in association with Shisha Productions. The album featured the voices of child artistes from across the globe, alongside popular singers Kavita Krishnamurthy and Usha Uthup.

Sanghar continued to write for a variety of publications, including NRI magazine, India Se and the prominent American Chronicle.

She subsequently channelled into television, having written and hosted countless TV programs on Zee TV such as 'Pure Allure', 'Style Mart' and the 'I20 Super Challenge Cricket OLAM Cup', interviewing renowned Indian celebrities such as Bhupendra Kumar Modi and Sunil Gavaskar. Sanghar hosted Singapore's first 6-part reality series titled 'My First Million Dollar'. The program aired on Starhub TV and was featured across 18 countries. Her more recent ventures include the culinary programs titled, Aunty’s Kitchen and Grill Please!.

Apart from her journalistic ventures, Sanghar hosts a series of speech therapy and public-speaking workshops for young students in Singapore. She also takes part in community awareness campaigns that focus on matters close to her heart, and has reported live on stories concerning the social welfare of local minority groups, including the rehabilitation of ex-convicts through the Yellow Ribbon Project.

Sanghar is the face of a designer boutique, 'Indochine with Gaurika', which was first officially launched in 2010 by the CEO and Editor-in-Chief for India Se, Shobha Tsering Bhalla in Singapore. Sanghar has undergone training at the New York Acting Academy and the Bollywood Dance Academy.

== Filmography ==
| Title | Role | TV Company |
|---|---|---|
| Aunty's Kitchen | Presenter/Writer | Mediacorp |
| Grill Please! | Presenter/Writer | Mediacorp |
| Go Cause | Reporter | MTV |
| My First Million Dollar | Presenter | Zee TV |
| Cricket Olam Cup | Presenter | Zee TV |
| Pure Allure | Presenter/Writer | Zee TV |
| Style Mart: Asian Woman | Presenter/Writer | Zee TV |
| Global Indian Idol | Presenter | Global Indian International School Singapore |
| Microsoft India | VO Artist | Moving Visuals |
| Supreme Collection | VO Artist | Zee TV |
| Spices of India | VO Artist | Zee TV |
| Kathmandu | VO Artist | Zee TV |

== Publications ==
| Year | Title | Role |
|---|---|---|
| 2011 | India Se | Writer |
| 2010 | American Chronicle | Writer |
| 2009 | Cleo | Editorial Cadet |
| 2008 | Voices Unheard | Online Correspondent |
