= Buddha (TV series) =

Indian Television Series

- Also known as: Buddha – Rajaon ka Raja
- Genre: Historical drama
- Written by: Gajra Kottary; Prakash Kapadia; Puneet S. Shukla
- Starring: Himanshu Soni; Kajal Jain; Gungun Uprari; Sanket Choukse; Kabir Bedi; Sameer Dharmadhikari; Jagat Singh; Reshmi Ghosh; Siddharth Vasudev; Amit Behl; Hemant Choudhary
- Country of origin: India
- Original language: Hindi
- No. of episodes: 55

Production
- Producer: Bhupendra Kumar Modi
- Cinematography: Veer Dhaval Puranik
- Running time: 1 hour

Original release
- Network: Zee TV; DD National
- Release: 8 September 2013 – 21 September 2014

Buddha — Rajaon Ka Raja (titled as Buddha — The King of Kings) is an Indian drama series which aired on Zee TV and DD National, produced by Bhupendra Kumar Modi, under the banner Spice Global. The programme stars Kabir Bedi in a cameo role as Asita Muni, the sage who announces the coming of Gautama Buddha. The story of the serial is based on the life of Gautama Buddha that shows how a prince, Siddhartha, became a Buddha. The role of Mayadevi – scheduled to be played by Sameksha Singh – was replaced with Deepika Upadhyay. Himanshu Soni played the lead role of Buddha, while Kajal Jain played Siddhartha Gautama's wife Yaśodharā. Earlier, Ashutosh Gowariker wanted to collaborate with Shekhar Kapur for a television series on Buddha.

== Cast ==
- Himanshu Soni as Gautama Buddha (Known For Shakyamuni.)
  - Vishesh Bansal as 10-year-old Prince Siddharth
- Sameer Dharmadhikari as Śuddhodana, Buddha and Nanda's father
- Deepika Upadhyay as Maya, Buddha's biological mother
- Gungun Uprari as Mahāprajāpatī Gautamī, Buddha's step mother and second wife of Suddhodana
- Kabir Bedi as Asita Muni
- Dinesh Mehta as King Pasenadi, an avid follower of Buddha
- Kajal Jain as Yaśodharā, Prince Siddharth's wife
  - Ananya Agarwal as Young Yaśodharā
- Meghan Jadhav as Prince Sundarānanda, Buddha's half-brother.
- Jagat Singh as Devadatta, Yasodhara's brother who is Buddha's enemy.
  - Pravisht Mishra as Teenage Devadatta
  - Devyansh Tapuriah as Child Devadatta
- Mayank Arora as Ānanda, Buddha's cousin and the primary attendant.
- Sanket Choukse as Channa, Buddha's best friend and charioteer.
- Siddharth Vasudev as Dronadhan, Śuddhodana's second brother
- Nigaar Khan / Reshmi Ghosh as Mangala, Buddha's aunt and Dronadhan's wife
- Abhiram / Yashdeep Nain as Ajatashatru
- Hemant Choudhary as Mahamantri Udyan
- Sarika Dhillon as Maanvika
- Ghanshyam srivastva Brahman Magadh Rajguru
- Amit Behl as Guru Vachaspati
- Surbhi Shukla as Loshika, Dasi of Prajapati
- Vandana Lalwani as Amita, Suddhodana's sister.
- Neha Uppal as Amrapali

== Plot ==
Born as Prince Siddhartha in the 6th century BC, after years of waiting and yearning, on a full moon night, to his parents King Shuddhodana and Queen Mahamaya, he was a unique child, even at birth. Carrying the 32 signs of greatness and predicted to be the savior of humankind by some, and a mighty king of kings by others, Siddhartha proved both the prophecies to be true.

In his growing years, he was the ideal warrior prince, the pride of his father’s eyes and later to his lovely wife Yashodhara, he was the devoted and sensitive husband that all women dream of, but few are blessed with. Despite his father’s extreme protection of him from seeing suffering of any kind, lest he move towards fulfilling the latter prophecy of him being a thinker and philosopher, even as a child, Siddhartha, by his very nature, ever-questioned and pondered about all phenomena around him.

Siddhartha wondered about all things- from social to physical and natural to man-made, and he was hugely compassionate and uncompetitive by nature. Siddhartha’s questions were not born out of the natural curiosity of a young boy about the world around, but of a deeply rational yet philosophical concern for the state of the world that he saw around him, and his devastation was compounded in his youth when the wall of protection from seeing suffering that his father had built around him, crumbled.

Samadhi was an enlightenment, that shone not only his path on earth, but also showed the way forward for all mankind, that would illuminate the world with his teachings for thousands of years to come, as it gave birth to the Buddha-a word that today symbolizes truth, peace, love, compassion and righteousness that he stood for, like no other. It is no wonder then that there is a revival of the relevance of Buddha’s teachings and beliefs in the modern world.

Most of the early episodes in the series center around the plotting of Dronadhan, Mangala, and Devadatta – the uncle, aunt, and cousin (brother) of Siddhartha – to undermine King Shuddhodana and kill Siddhartha. Their plots always fail, and the goodness of Siddhartha always wins and grows. Much of this drama as shown in the series is not actually part of the Buddha historical writings. Though Devadatta did have a rivalry with Siddhartha, it wasn't to the extent as shown in the series, where Devadatta and his parents abuse and kill numerous people. The series also shows an extreme rivalry between Siddhartha and Devadatta for the hand in marriage of Yashodhara, even to the point of a fighting contest to determine the best warrior. However, in genuine history, Yashodhara was actually Devadatta's sister. Still, the character of Siddhartha is dramatic and moving in many ways, and shows his deep respect for all life, whether it be a person, cheetah, duck, ant or scorpion, to whom he always shows forgiveness and mercy.

== Production ==
Varsha Jain designed the sets, and Nidhi Yasha designed the costumes and jewellery for the series. Filming began on 27 May 2013, on the auspicious occasion of Buddha Purnima, on sound stages and outdoor shooting locations at the Film City in Mumbai.

== Controversies ==
The cable operators of Nepal banned the series' telecast as it had announced in promotional materials that the Buddha was born in India (the actual location of Kapilavastu is uncertain, with sites in both India and Nepal suggested). Following outrage on Nepalese social media, Zee TV and Kabir Bedi later apologized for the mistake.

== Critical reception ==
Daily News and Analysis praised the performances of all the actors in Buddha, says Sameer Dharmadhikari aka Suddhodana Acting is first rated.

== See also ==
- Buddhacarita
- Amrapali
- Aamrapali, television series
- Chanakya
- Chanakya, television series
- List of Chanakya episodes
- Little Buddha
- Depictions of Gautama Buddha in film
