= Xerox India =

Indian branch of the Xerox Corporation

- Logo of the former name Modi Xerox
- Formerly: Modi Xerox
- Type: Subsidiary
- Headquarters: Gurgaon, India
- Area served: India
- Parent: Xerox Corporation

Xerox India, based in Gurgaon, India, is the Indian subsidiary of Xerox Corporation, an American printer, photocopier, document supplies, technology & services company.

Originally Modi Xerox Limited, the business was derived from a joint venture formed between Dr Bhupendra Kumar Modi a.k.a. Dr. M through ModiCorp (now Spice Group) and Rank Xerox in September 1983. The share structure was 40% ModiCorp, 40% Rank Xerox and 20% private shareholders. It built upon an earlier co-operation, Indian Xerographic Systems, formed in 1982. Other partnerships included Modi Xerox Software Systems, created in 1995 and Modi Xerox Financial Services.

Rank Xerox was absorbed into Xerox Corporation in 1997 and Xerox obtained a majority stake in Modi Xerox in 1999. After obtaining majority ownership of Modi Xerox, it was renamed Xerox ModiCorp and the software and financial services operations were incorporated into the main business.

== Financial irregularities ==
In July 2002, during a troubled period for Xerox Corporation after allegations of accounting irregularities by the U.S. Securities and Exchange Commission, Xerox Corporation disclosed that Xerox ModiCorp had made "improper payments" to government officials and fictitious firms. A government probe later found Xerox Modi Corp had violated certain corruption laws and in May 2005 it was reported that action would be taken against the company. At this time Xerox ModiCorp announced its name change to Xerox India. After all these activities Modi Xerox closed its factory in Rampur. According to the Economic Times, Xerox Corporation owned 86% of Xerox India in March 2005 and is seeking 100% control. The remaining shares are held by Modi Rubber and private stakeholders.

== See also ==
- Xerox
- Rank Xerox
- Fuji Xerox
