= Rank Xerox =

Former joint venture business

Rank Xerox Limited
- Formerly: Rank Xerox Limited (until 31 October 1997)
- Industry: Office equipment
- Founded: 19 December 1956; 69 years ago
- Fate: Acquired by Xerox
- Successor: Xerox Limited
- Parent: Xerox Corp.

Rank Xerox Limited was formed in 1956 as a joint venture between the Xerox Corporation of United States (a.k.a. Haloid Photographic) and The Rank Organisation of the United Kingdom, to manufacture and market Xerox equipment initially in Europe and later in Africa and Asia. A further joint venture between Rank Xerox and Modi Group in India formed Modi Xerox (now Xerox India) to manufacture and sell Xerox equipment in the Indian subcontinent.

The initial joint venture was 50% Xerox and 50% Rank Organisation, but this changed after a few years to a 60/40 split. Later, Xerox bought a further share making the split 80/20, and in the late 1990s, completed the purchase, so Rank Xerox Limited formally became Xerox Limited. The Rank Xerox Research Centre was renamed to the Xerox Research Centre Europe. The laboratory, based in France, was acquired by South Korean IT company Naver Corporation in 2017, and later became Naver Labs Europe.

== History ==
Early 1990s Rank Xerox copier paper.

In 1956, The Rank Organisation was looking for a product to sit alongside a small business it had making camera lenses. Thomas Law, who was the head of the business, found his answer in a scientific magazine he picked up by chance. He read about an invention that could produce copies of documents as good as the original. Law tracked down the backers, an obscure photographic-supply company in Rochester, New York, named Haloid.

Haloid and Rank subsequently formed an affiliate called Rank Xerox (Rank put up £600,000 for a 50% stake in Rank Xerox). This arrangement paved the way for Xerox factories in Great Britain and a sales and distribution system that brought Xerox machines to the European market. As photocopying took the world by storm, so did Rank's profits. According to Graham Dowson, later Rank's chief executive, it was "a stroke of luck that turned out to be a touch of genius … If Tom Law had not seen that magazine, we would not have known about xerography – or at least not before it was too late." In 1962, Rank Xerox also formed a joint marketing and manufacturing facility in Japan with The Fuji Photo Film Company and named Fuji Xerox (now Fujifilm Business Innovation).

In a speech in 1968, Rank Xerox managing director Nigel Foulkes said that in 1961 the company had had "a five-years' lead over the rest of the world", with copying products which had no serious competition. But "you cannot strike oil and not expect other prospectors to sink wells".

In December 1969, control of Rank Xerox passed to Xerox Corporation. The arrangements entitled Rank Xerox to undertake the manufacture, distribution and sale of new product lines, including computers and related electronic data processing equipment and services.

In 1968, Rank Xerox, under Foulkes, initiated a marketing concept to sell rather than rent their copying machines behind the Iron Curtain, by appointing Gordon S Planner as General Manager East Export Operations via a firm of head hunters. Sales of machines increased rapidly to Eastern Europe and a unique marketing concept deployed in 1973 using a specially built and equipped train showcasing Rank Xerox copiers, it toured nine countries in Eastern Europe covering 30,000 miles and returned orders of over £3m. Commissioning London based designer Cairnes Maltby, the latter came up firstly with a train unit comprising five carriages. These contained staff accommodations, a kitchen, overnight staff sleeping cabins and a demonstration salon and bar. Pulled by engines of the various countries of the Soviet Bloc, the train reached Russia and a welcome market. The following year Cairnes Design Associates produced the first of the Rank Xerox Showliners. A large, articulated, semi-trailer truck with motorised pull-outs, this allowed the road-legal trailer to extend to a fully functional showroom, complete with large picture windows and small kitchen. Unlike the train it was capable of reaching the small to medium size cities of the Soviet Bloc. Both train and truck avoided the problems that affected western firms trying to establish a presence in the East.

Later, in the UK, the mobile exhibition concept was taken to its ultimate conclusion. Following several truck based Showliners, a train and a converted bus, a huge mobile exhibition was conceived. This moved from town to town, like a circus, using sports halls and exhibition centres to present a vast, virtual, office of the future. Ralph Land CBE, was General Manager of Rank Xerox Eastern Europe Operations (1976–91).

During the 1980s the managing director Roland E. Magnin helped the company to become the international arm of Xerox Corporation. He then moved to the corporation's headquarters in Connecticut where he was responsible for the decentralization program of the company as one of its top directors.

The remaining 20% stake owned by the Rank Organization in Rank Xerox Limited was bought out by the parent Xerox Corporation for £940 million in 1997; the company was renamed Xerox Limited soon after. The Rank Xerox name was discontinued following the buyout in favour of Xerox, and the Rank Xerox Research Centre was renamed to the Xerox Research Centre Europe. The laboratory, based in France, was acquired by South Korean IT company Naver Corporation in 2017, and later became Naver Labs Europe.

== Awards ==
- Rank Xerox was the first winner of the European Quality Award in 1992.
- Rank Xerox was the first sponsor of Southampton F.C. from 1980 until 1983.
- Rank Xerox was the first sponsor of Hull Kingston Rovers in 1983.

== See also ==
- The comic character RanXerox, initially named after a Rank Xerox photocopier.
