= Bobbie (company) =

American infant formula company

Bobbie Baby, Inc.
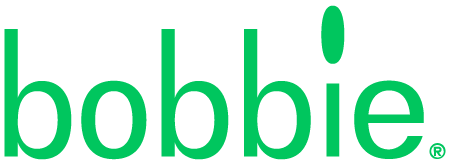
- Bobbie logo
- Company type: Private
- Founded: 2018; 8 years ago
- Founders: Laura Modi; Sarah Hardy
- Headquarters: Heath, Ohio, United States
- Products: Infant formula
- Website: www.hibobbie.com

Bobbie Baby, Inc. is an American organic infant formula and supplements company based in Heath, Ohio. It was founded by Laura Modi in 2018; Sarah Hardy joined as a co-founder the next year.

== History ==
=== 2018-2021; Early history ===
Bobbie was founded in 2018 by Laura Modi, an Irish-American who was working as an executive at Airbnb. The idea behind the company came from her difficulty finding suitable baby formula to feed her first infant. Sarah Hardy, a co-worker from Airbnb, also helped establish Bobbie in 2019. Modi named the company Bobbie after her infant daughter's pronunciation of the word "bottle."

An early version of Bobbie's European-style formula was initially recalled by the U.S. Food and Drug Administration (FDA) in 2019 due to concerns about the product labeling. The company revised the formula's labeling and the product became the first European-style formula to meet FDA requirements, and officially launched in January 2021.

Reaching the market in 2021, Bobbie was the first direct-to-consumer, subscription-based infant formula in the U.S. Bobbie's infant formula is made with organic ingredients and does not use corn syrup, palm oil, or fillers.

=== 2022 to present ===
In February 2022, the company's sales increased when Abbott Laboratories shut down and recalled its formula products, leading to a formula shortage. During the shortage, Bobbie temporarily stopped accepting new subscriptions in order to guarantee supply to existing customers. In May 2023, the company released its second product, a formula it calls “organic gentle”, designed for fussy babies. By July 2022, Bobbie's formula was being carried at Target. From 2022 to 2023, Bobbie grew 394 percent, reached $100 million in revenue, and exceeded 100 employees.

The company also operates Bobbie Labs, a research and development hub which invests in research to expand its product offerings.

In July 2023, the company acquired pediatric nutrition company Nature's One, after closing a $70 million Series C funding round.

Bobbie opened a manufacturing facility in Heath, Ohio, in summer 2023; it was the first infant formula manufacturing plant constructed in the U.S. since the 1980s. Bobbie owns end-to-end manufacturing at the facility while still working alongside co-manufacturer Perrigo. In 2024, Bobbie began selling vitamin D and probiotic drops for infants. That October, the company was the first to feature a breastfeeding mother (cookbook author Molly Baz) in an outdoor advertisement in Times Square, part of its "Formula is Food" campaign to address stigma around breastfeeding and formula feeding.

== Ingredients ==
Bobbie's milk has high DHA content and 60:40 whey to casein ratio, similar to what is found in breast milk. The milk is sourced from Organic Valley milk from pasture-raised cows around the U.S. and is manufactured in Ohio. It is produced and processed in the United States but is also labelled "European-style," due to more restrictive EU formula requirements. Bobbie claims to avoid high fructose corn syrup and palm oil.

== Advocacy ==
Bobbie created its advocacy arm, Bobbie for Change, in 2022 to address issues that affect parents. The same year, the company announced and open sourced its parental leave policy, TakeOurLeave, which offers all parents up to 12 months of leave. The company advocates for federal paid parental leave. Bobbie's "Parents Push Harder" campaign for paid parental leave won a silver Anthem Award.

Bobbie CEO Modi worked with Representative Rosa DeLauro and Senator Bob Casey to draft and introduce the Infant Formula Made in America Act, which aims to reinforce the domestic supply chain.

== See also ==
- ByHeart
