= Fujifilm Business Innovation =

Japanese document management corporation, subsidiary of Fujifilm

Fujifilm Business Innovation Corporation

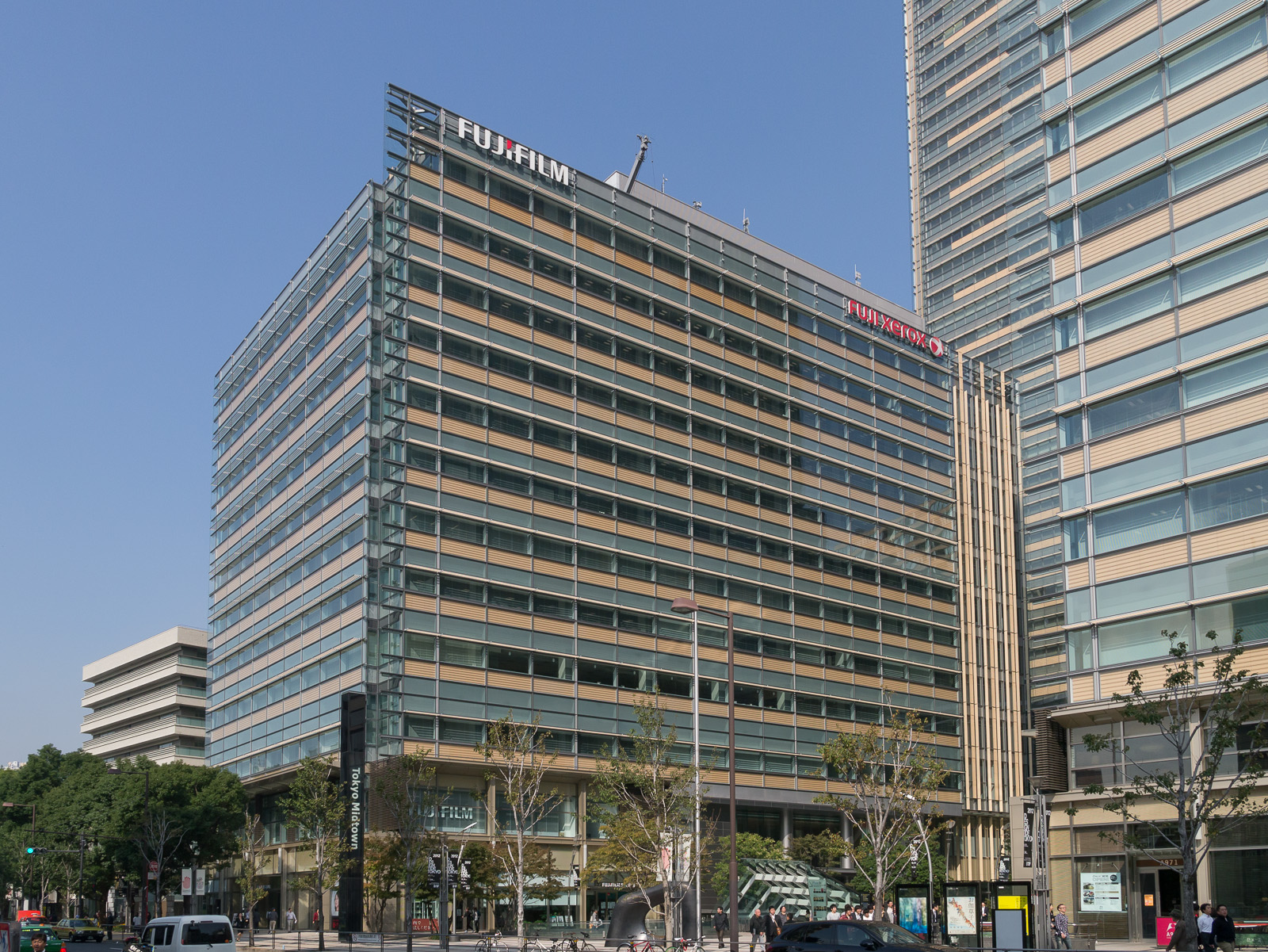
- Native name: 富士フイルムビジネスイノベーション株式会社
- Formerly: Fuji Xerox Co., Ltd.
- Type: Subsidiary
- Industry: Document processing
- Founded: February 20, 1962; 64 years ago
- Headquarters: Midtown West, Tokyo Midtown, Akasaka, Minato, Tokyo, Japan
- Key people: Tadahito Yamamoto (Chairman); Hiroshi Kurihara (President)
- Products: Photocopiers; Printers
- Revenue: $11.1bn
- Number of employees: 40,646 (as of Mar 2009 - Consolidated)
- Parent: Fujifilm
- Website: www.fujifilm.com/fbglobal/eng

Fujifilm Business Innovation Corporation (Japanese: 富士フイルムビジネスイノベーション株式会社), formerly known as Fuji Xerox Co., Ltd., is a Japanese company specializing in the development, production, and sale of xerographic and document-related products and services across the Asia-Pacific region. As a wholly owned subsidiary of Fujifilm Holdings, its headquarters are situated in Midtown West, Akasaka, Minato, Tokyo.

Originally established as a joint venture between Fujifilm and the American document management company Xerox, Fuji Xerox played a prominent role in the industry for 59 years. However, in 2019, Fujifilm assumed full ownership by acquiring the remaining shares, marking the conclusion of the long-standing partnership with Xerox. The formal conclusion of this collaboration occurred on March 31, 2021.

== History ==
Fuji Xerox was established in 1962 as a 50:50 partnership with Rank Xerox. Rank Xerox was absorbed into Xerox Corporation in 1997.

Initially serving as a distributor exclusively for Rank Xerox products, Fuji Xerox transitioned into independent research and development, introducing its proprietary xerographic machines and devices. Notably, their pioneering venture began with the creation of the FX2200 photocopier in 1973, acknowledged as the world's smallest copier at the time. Beyond distribution, Fuji Xerox played a pivotal role in advancing color printing technologies, contributing to the innovation and manufacturing of various devices marketed by Xerox Corporation. Among their milestones is the introduction of the "Xero Printer 100" in 1987, recognized as the world's first multifunction printer/copier.

Fuji Xerox expanded into Australia, New Zealand, Singapore and Malaysia in 1982 by purchasing distribution rights from Xerox Corporation, it established a subsidiary company Fuji Xerox Asia Pacific Pte headquartered in Singapore.

In 2000, Xerox Corporation transferred its China/Hong Kong operations to Fuji Xerox, and by 2001, Fuji Photo Film Co. had elevated its stake in the venture to 75%.

The company's previous logo as Fuji Xerox

As of March 2009, the company employed 40,646 people (Consolidated).

On January 31, 2018, Xerox announced an agreement with Fujifilm for the acquisition of a 50.1% controlling stake in the company, amounting to US$6.1 billion. This move aimed to merge the two entities into Fuji Xerox, establishing a company with an aggregate market value of US$18 billion However, the deal was called off in May 2018 following resistance by Xerox's board.

On November 5, 2019, Fujifilm had announced that they would acquire the remaining 25% stake of Fuji Xerox from Xerox for a total of $2.3 Billion.

On January 6, 2020, Fujifilm announced that it would not renew its technology agreement with Xerox when it expires at the end of March 2021, and that Fuji Xerox would be renamed Fujifilm Business Innovation Corporation in April 2021. Fujifilm stated that unwinding the venture would allow them to "utilise our own technologies and synergise with technologies owned by other Fujifilm Group companies to produce/market products and solutions under our own new brand worldwide". The company will maintain its product supply agreements with Xerox.

== Headquarters ==
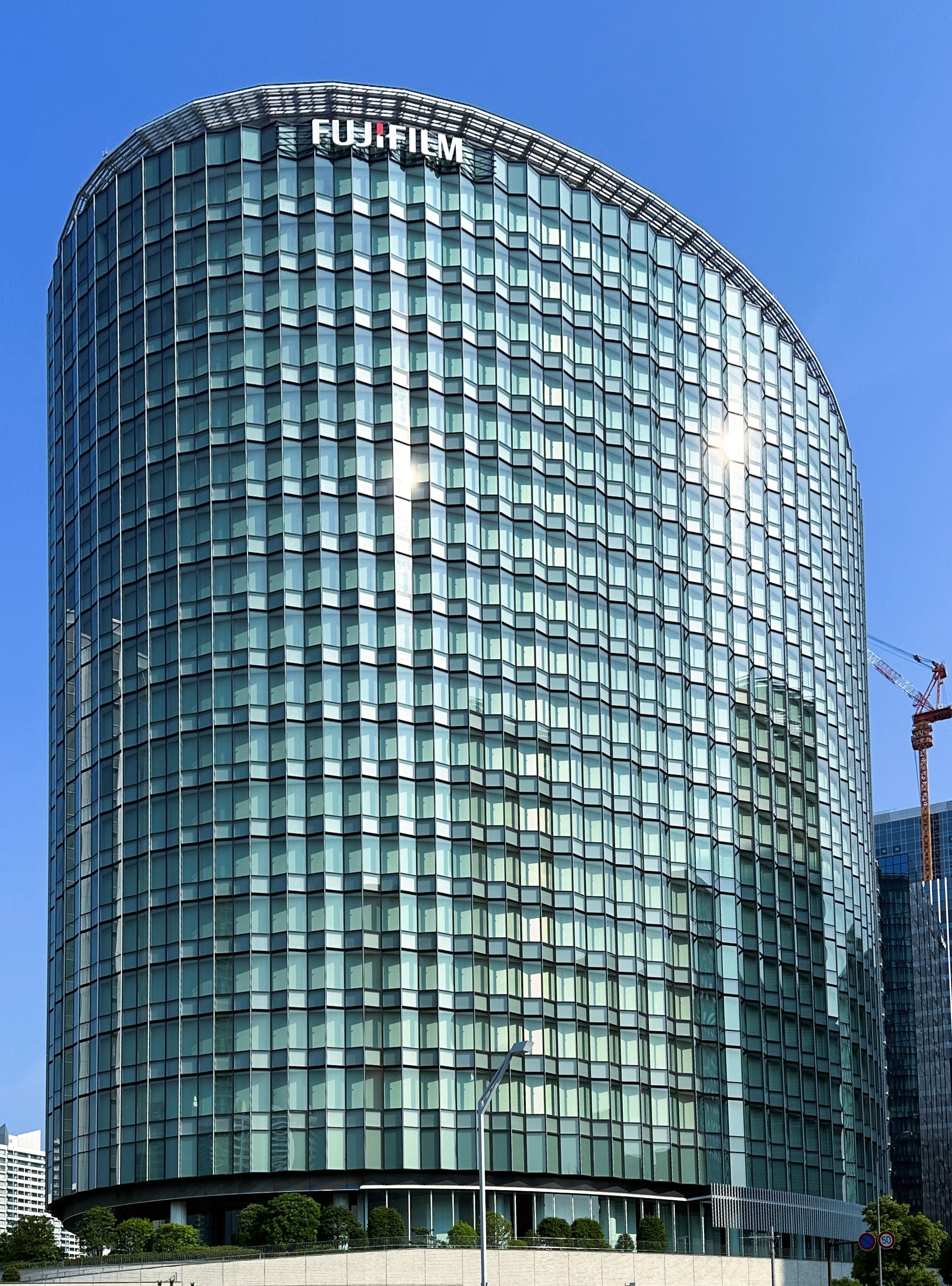
The Yokohama Minatomirai Office in Nishi-ku, Yokohama

Fujifilm Business Innovation Corporation has its headquarters situated at Tokyo Midtown West in Minato, Tokyo. Additionally, the company maintains a key office at Toyosu Bayside Cross Tower in Kōtō, Tokyo, along with branch offices strategically positioned in Yokohama, Ebina, and Minamiashigara, Kanagawa Prefecture.

== Docuprint Printers ==
As of February 2024, Docuprint Printers manufactured by FujiXerox have all of its drivers removed with an End of Life message. The windows drivers are not natively detected by windows update. And the previously available drivers, such as for CM205b available here, have been removed from the official website.

== See also ==
- Xerox
- Fujifilm
- Mitsui
- Xerox India
- FXPAL
- Japanese Super Cup (also known as Fujifilm Super Cup for sponsorship reasons)
- Fuji Xerox Towers
