= Dayawati Modi =

Indian philanthropist (1915–1994)

- Born: 1915; Kasganj, United Provinces of Agra and Oudh, British India
- Died: 1994 (aged 78–79)
- Occupation: Philanthropist
- Spouse: Gujarmal Modi (m. 1932)
- Children: 11, including Krishan and Bhupendra

Dayawati Modi (1915–1994) was an Indian philanthropist. She was the wife of industrialist Gujarmal Modi. She was referred to as Maji as a sign of respect and gratitude. She provided educational opportunities to women and children in Modinagar and elsewhere. She is the grandmother of Lalit Modi, the founder of the Indian Premier League (IPL).

== Personal life ==
Dayawati Modi was born in Kasganj, a small town in Uttar Pradesh. Her father was Chheda Lal. She lost her mother at the age of three. She was not formally educated, however she had a penchant for literature, which led to her reading many books stored in her uncle's attic. This contributed to her work with philanthropy in the education sector. On 19 June 1932, Dayawati Modi married Gujarmal Modi at the age of seventeen. This was Gujarmal Modi's second marriage, after his first wife died due a prolonged illness. Dayawati lived with her father initially, as Gujarmal set about establishing his business in erstwhile Begumabad. Thereafter, the couple had eleven children, five boys and six girls. - K.K Modi, V.K Modi, S.K Modi, B.K Modi (Dr. M), U.K Modi.

== Awards and recognition ==
- 1982– Shiromani Award for Sikh Studies
- 1983– Kala Sangam Award
- 1986– Bharat Seva Ratna by World Religious Parliament
- 1978– Included by Cambridge University in their Who's Who of Intellectuals for the year.

== Philanthropy ==
Modi catered to women and children's issues in the mid-1950s. In 1954, she founded the Samaj Kalyan Parishad at Modinagar, which provided welfare services to women and children, such as giving them access to education, vocational training and other allied support services. In honour of her philanthropic contribution to society, her family instituted three awards: Dayawati Modi Kavi Shekhar Samman, the Dayawati Modi Award for Art, Culture and Education and the Dayawati Modi Stree Shakti Samman. Recipients of these awards include the Dalai Lama, Kent Walwin, and Amitabh Bachchan.

After her death in 1994, the philanthropic work has been continued by the Dayawati Modi Foundation.
