= Samir Modi =

Indian businessman

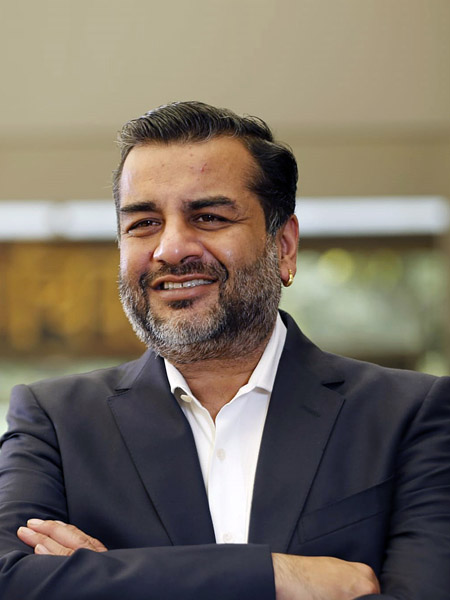
- Samir Modi in 2022
- Born: 15 December 1969 (age 56)
- Education: The Doon School; Hindu College, Delhi; Delhi University; Harvard University
- Occupation: Businessman
- Title: Executive director, Modi Enterprises
- Spouse: Shivani Modi
- Children: 2
- Parent(s): K.K. Modi and Bina Modi

Samir Modi (born 15 December 1969) is an Indian businessman, and the younger son of K.K. Modi and Bina Modi. He is an executive director at Modi Enterprises, which was founded by his grandfather, Gujarmal Modi, in 1933. He is also an executive director of Godfrey Phillips India and a director of Indofil Industries Ltd. He participated in launching various initiatives for the Modi Group, including Modicare, Colorbar Cosmetics and Twenty Four Seven convenience stores.

== Education ==
Modi studied at the all-boys boarding school, The Doon School in Dehradun. He then received a bachelor's degree from Hindu College, University of Delhi, and a management degree from Harvard Business School.

== Career ==
Modi started his career in 1992 as a management trainee with Philip Morris in the United States, where he worked on promoting Marlboro cigarettes. After gaining experience in different roles within the Modi Group's businesses, he launched Modicare in 1996, a network marketing venture that began with 12 products and 300 distributors. By 2003, he had taken charge of the cosmetics segment at Modicare and introduced Colorbar Cosmetics to the Indian market in 2004. Over time, he worked on transforming Colorbar into a more premium yet affordable brand. In 2005, Modi founded 24Seven, India's first 24-hour retail store chain, promoting it as a convenient destination for everyday and general needs.

== Personal life ==
He is the youngest of K.K. Modi and Bina Modi's children. Samir's elder sister, Charu Modi is the CEO and vice-president of Modi Academic International Institute, while brother Lalit Modi is a former cricket administrator, who founded the Indian Premier League (IPL) cricket tournament in 2008. In 1991, Samir married Shivani (née Gupta), whose father runs Delton Cables. They have two daughters, Jayati and Vedika. Their elder daughter Jayati had a small role was part in the 2013 film Gippi. He was a state-level boxing champion and won a gold medal in a Delhi state boxing championship.

== Philanthropy ==
In 1996, he set up the Modicare Foundation to prevent the escalation of HIV/AIDS, enhance awareness, and erase the myths and misconceptions surrounding the disease. In 2002, Modi published The Positive Side, a book that promotes AIDS awareness and contains real-life experiences of patients and their battle with the disease.
