= Lalit Modi =

Indian businessman and Former cricket administrator (born 1963)

Lalit Modi Sangha
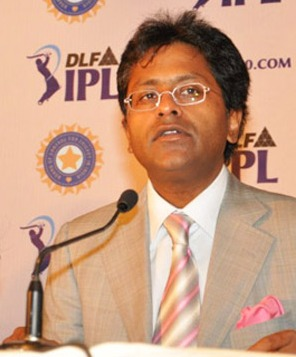
- Modi at the DLF IPL players auction in 2010

Chairperson of Indian Premier League
- In office 2005–2010
- Preceded by: Position established
- Succeeded by: Chirayu Amin

President of Rajasthan Cricket Association (RCA)
- In office 2005–2009

Vice President of Punjab Cricket Association (PCA)
- In office 2004–2012

President and Managing Director of Modi Enterprises
- In office 1991–2022

Executive Director of Godfrey Phillips India
- In office 1992–2010

President of Rajasthan Cricket Association (RCA)
- In office 2014–2015

Personal details
- Born: Lalit Modi Sangha; 29 November 1963 (age 62) New Delhi, India
- Spouse: Minal Sagrani (m. 1991; died 2018)
- Domestic partner(s): Sushmita Sen (2022–2025)
- Children: 2
- Parent: Krishan Kumar Modi (father)
- Relatives: Charu Modi (sister); Samir Modi (brother); Bhupendra Kumar Modi (uncle); Gujarmal Modi (grandfather); Dayawati Modi (grandmother)
- Education: Pace University; Duke University
- Occupation: Businessman
- Known for: Founding and being the first League Commissioner of the Indian Premier League
- Website: lalitmodi.com

Lalit Kumar Modi (born 29 November 1963) is a British businessman of Indian origin and a former cricket administrator. He was the founder, first chairman and league commissioner of the Indian Premier League (IPL), and ran the tournament for three years until 2010. He also served as the Chairman of the Champions League from 2008 till 2010 and was Vice President of the BCCI from 2005 till 2010. He has also served as the President of the Rajasthan Cricket Association from 2005 till 2009 and then again from 2014 till 2015, and as the vice president of the Punjab Cricket Association from 2004 till 2012.

As a close associate of the Bharatiya Janata Party (BJP) leader Vasundhara Raje, Modi once held considerable political clout in Rajasthan. During Raje's first term as the Chief Minister, he was called "Super Chief Minister" by the opposition and the media. In 2010, Modi alleged that the Indian National Congress minister Shashi Tharoor held indirect free equity in the Kochi Tuskers Kerala IPL franchise, ultimately leading to Tharoor's resignation. The Kochi franchise alleged that Modi was harassing them, because he wanted another group to win the franchise bid. Shortly after IPL 2010 ended, Modi was suspended from BCCI after being accused of misconduct, indiscipline and financial irregularities. BCCI launched an investigation against him, and banned him for life in 2013 after a committee found him guilty of these charges. Modi denied any wrongdoing, and blamed accusations on political rivalries. Shortly before the Enforcement Directorate (ED) launched an investigation against him for alleged financial irregularities, he fled to London and was labeled a fugitive.

== Early life and education ==
Lalit Kumar Modi born in Delhi on 29 November 1963, into one of India's leading business families, the elder son of Krishan Kumar Modi and his wife Bina Modi. He has an elder sister, Charu Modi Bhartia, and a younger brother, Samir Modi. His grandfather Gujar Mal Modi had established the Modi Group business conglomerate and the town of Modinagar. His father KK Modi greatly expanded the family business.

Modi joined Bishop Cotton School in Shimla, in 1971. His family later moved him to St Joseph's College, Nainital, because of a kidnapping threat. In 1980, he was expelled from St. Joseph's for truancy, having left school to watch a movie.

Between 1983 and 1986, Modi studied electrical engineering and business administration in the United States. He attended Pace University in New York for two years, and then Duke University in North Carolina for one year. He did not graduate from either of these institutions. In 1985, while a sophomore, Modi and three other students tried to buy half a kilogram of cocaine for $10,000 at a motel. The man posing as a seller threatened them with a shotgun, and robbed them of $10,000. The next day, Modi and his friends beat up a student, whom they suspected of setting them up. As a result, on 1 March 1985, Modi was arrested on charges of conspiracy to traffic cocaine, assault and second-degree kidnapping. The next day, Modi and another student were indicted. Modi pleaded guilty to the crime when the case was heard in the Durham County court, North Carolina and later entered a plea bargain, which resulted in a suspended two-year prison sentence. In lieu of prison time, he was placed under a five-year probation and ordered to do 100 hours' community service. In 1986, Modi sought permission from the court to return to India, citing bad health. The Durham County Court accepted his plea and ordered him to perform 200 hours of community service in India. Modi's return to India was facilitated by some of his father's businessmen friends, including Leonard Lauder. When asked about this matter in 2010, Modi stated "I've got no idea about these allegations, which have been investigated and nothing was found."

In 1986, Modi came back to Delhi, and joined the family business. He served as the President of International Tobacco Company Limited from 1987 to 1991. On 21 August 1989, he was made a Non-Executive & Non-Independent Director at Godfrey Phillips India, one of India's largest tobacco companies, and a joint venture between his family's Modi Enterprises and Philip Morris International. In February 1992, he was made an executive director of Godfrey Phillips India, and retained that position until 1 August 2010.

== Personal life ==
In Delhi, Modi started courting the nine-years-older Minal Sagrani, who was the daughter of Nigeria-based Sindhi Hindu businessman, Pesu Aswani, and the ex-wife of another Nigeria-based Sindhi businessman, Jack Sagrani. His family initially opposed the marriage, as Minal was a recently divorced mother and nine years older than him. Modi managed to get his grandmother Dayawati Modi on his side, who convinced the family to agree to the marriage. The couple married on 17 October 1991 in Mumbai. The couple settled in Mumbai, as Minal faced a social boycott in Delhi. They initially lived in KK Modi's apartment in Pedder Road area, but later bought Minal's father's house in Juhu as their family grew. They have two children – son Ruchir Modi and daughter Aliya. Lalit Modi also has a step-daughter Karima Sagrani, from Minal's first marriage. On 10 December 2018, Minal died of cancer.

In July 2022, he announced that he is dating former Miss Universe Sushmita Sen. They broke up on 14 February 2025.

On 15 September 2026, he acquired British citizenship and celebrated at ceremony with his family and friends.

== Early business career ==
In 1993, Modi established Modi Entertainment Networks (MEN), using money from a family trust. MEN started as a 10-year joint venture with Walt Disney Pictures, to broadcast some of Disney's content in India, including Fashion TV. In 1994, MEN became the pan-India distributor of ESPN on a ten-year contract worth $975 million. His job was to collect money from the cable companies in India in exchange for the broadcasting ESPN. ESPN did not renew its contract with Modi, alleging that he underreported revenues. MEN also lost a contract with Fashion TV, after Modi fell out with its founder Michel Adam Lisowski. Most of Modi's businesses in Mumbai were not profitable, and he lived on a maintenance allowance from his father's company.

Later, Modi became the President and managing director of Modi Enterprises, an industrial conglomerate run by his family.

In 2002, Modi launched an online lottery business in Kerala called Sixo.

== Cricket administration ==
In the US, Modi had been impressed by the huge revenues of the American sports leagues. In 1995, he pitched his idea for a new 50-over tournament to BCCI. He even registered a name – Indian Cricket League Limited – for the proposed league. However, the BCCI did not take the proposal seriously. Modi then resolved to join the Board. As a step towards this goal, in 1999, he managed to get elected to the Himachal Pradesh Cricket Association, a constituent body of BCCI. However, his attempt to gain control of the Association failed, and he was forced to leave the Association by the Chief Minister of the state. In 2004, Modi was elected as the vice-president of the Punjab Cricket Association, under the President Inderjit Singh Bindra. He retained this position in the 2008 elections.

=== Rajasthan Cricket Association ===
In 2003, Modi's friend Vasundhara Raje was elected as the Chief Minister of Rajasthan. Modi knew Raje through a common school friend Bina Kilachand, and had become one of the Chief Minister's closest associates.

After his failed stint in Himachal Pradesh, Modi decided to gain control of the Rajasthan Cricket Association (RCA), another constituent body of BCCI. The RCA had been controlled by the Rungta business family for over three decades. It had 32 district associations as its constituent members, plus 66 individual members – all of whom were members or peons of the Rungta household. During the 1980s and 1990s, there were several unsuccessful attempts to eject the Rungta family from the RCA. After Vasundhara Raje became the Chief Minister of Rajasthan, a faction led by Modi started fresh attempts to defeat the Rungtas. Modi registered himself with the RCA under the name "Lalit Kumar", as a member of the Nagore district's cricket association. He didn't use his full name for the fear of being denied entry.

In 2005, Modi used his connections with Raje to get the Rajasthan Sports Act passed. This ordinance took away voting rights from the 66 individual members, leaving only the 32 district associations as voters. As a result, Modi was elected as the President of RCA, defeating the incumbent Kishore Rungta by just 1 vote.

As the RCA President, he spent ₹20 crore to renovate Jaipur's Sawai Mansingh Stadium, making it one of the best cricket stadiums in the country. He spent another ₹7 crore to build a state-of-the-art cricket academy. He sold the boundary-rope advertising for ₹15 lakh per spot, more than double the previous rate. He also ended the practice of giving away tickets for free and sold corporate box seats for ₹1,25,000 each.

=== Board of Control for Cricket in India ===
After becoming the RCA President in 2005, Modi helped the Nationalist Congress Party leader Sharad Pawar defeat Jagmohan Dalmiya in the BCCI Presidential elections. Subsequently, Modi was appointed vice-president of the BCCI.

Lalit Modi was heavily involved in the commercial side of the BCCI. Between 2005 and 2008, BCCI's revenues increased sevenfold, touching the $1 billion mark.

=== Indian Premier League ===
In 2008, Lalit Modi was instrumental in launching the Indian Premier League (IPL), based around Twenty20 cricket. He also engineered the IPL's move to South Africa in 2009, after the dates of the tournament clashed with the Indian general election and the Union Minister of Home Affairs, P. Chidambaram, could not commit to the security of the tournament. The IPL grew into one of the world's biggest sports league, worth over $4 billion. The commercial success of IPL and Modi's control of the league led to him being compared to Don King (boxing promoter) and Bernie Ecclestone (Formula One promoter).

Modi's family and friends also profited from IPL. Suresh Chellaram, his brother-in-law (husband of his sister Kavita), owned a majority share in the Rajasthan Royals franchise. His step-daughter Karima's husband Gaurav Burman was a stakeholder in Global Cricket Venture, which won the digital, mobile and internet rights of the IPL. Gaurav's brother Mohit Burman was a stakeholder in Kings XI Punjab. Jay Mehta, one of the owners of Kolkata Knight Riders, is a childhood friend of Lalit Modi. Rajasthan Royals, Kings XI Punjab and Kolkata Knight Riders were the cheapest franchises and very closely priced, leading to speculation that Modi had passed on insider information to the owners.

== Role in Rajasthan politics ==
As a close associate of the Chief Minister Vasundhara Raje, Lalit Modi became a powerful figure in Rajasthan, and came to be known as a "super chief minister". He continued to live in Mumbai, where his network had expanded to include leading industrialists and Bollywood stars. He visited Jaipur frequently, and stayed at the Rambagh Palace, where ministers and civil servants would queue up to meet him and ask for favours.

Modi entered the real estate business with a company called Amer Heritage City Construction Pvt Ltd, where his wife, Minal, served as a director. Modi pressured local officials and secured control of two havelis near the Amer Fort, in contravention of Archaeological Survey of India's rules. He intended to renovate and convert these havelis into a heritage resort. Mahant Shiv Prakash Bhattacharya, the 75-year-old titleholder of the Choor Singh ki Haveli, initiated a court case to thwart Modi's attempt to take over his haveli. During Raje's tenure, the Jaipur Development Authority framed ad-hoc rules to allow re-classification of agricultural land and its use for non-agricultural purposes. This change, which benefited several big builders from Delhi, was allegedly presided over by Lalit Modi.

In 2007, Modi disallowed the IAS officer Mahendra Surana to watch a match at the Sawai Mansingh Stadium, because he believed Suarana to be an associate of the Rungta faction of RCA. When Surana and his friend Hemendra Suarana (an army doctor and a former Ranji player) arrived at the Stadium, Modi tore their tickets. He repeated this act with the IPS officer R.P. Srivastava. During a cricket match, he slapped a constable for walking into his box at the Sawai Mansingh Stadium, leading to protests by the city's constabulary.

Modi's increasing power in Rajasthan politics became a key issue in the 2008 Rajasthan elections, which Raje lost. Ashok Gehlot of Congress, who succeeded Raje as the Chief Minister, accused Modi of acting as an "extra-constitutional authority" during his campaign. After Raje was voted out of power, Modi's power in Rajasthan reduced considerably. In January 2009, he had spent several hours at a police station after an FIR was registered on the basis of a complaint by a Samajwadi Party activist for forgery. In March 2009, his faction lost the RCA election. The new leadership appointed a committee to probe alleged financial irregularities during his regime.

== Kochi Tuskers Kerala controversy ==
By 2009, suggestions of a rivalry between Modi and N. Srinivasan surfaced. During 2009–10, Lalit Modi oversaw the bidding process for induction of two new teams in the Indian Premier League. In December 2009, he inserted two new clauses in the invitation to tender (ITT): the bidder should have a net worth of at least US$1 billion and must provide a bank guarantee of US$100 million. Modi stated that these clauses protected BCCI's interests. However, other BCCI board members claimed that he was rigging bids to suit Adani Group and Videocon Group, as the new clauses would rule out most of the other prospective bidders. After the ITT was floated on 22 February 2010, some of the prospective bidders, including Sahara Group and Jagran Group, complained to the BCCI President Shashank Manohar that they were being deliberately kept out of the tendering process. After receiving only two bids, IPL changed the ITT, removing the net worth clause and reducing the guarantee amount to US$10 million.

In March 2010, a consortium of investors led by Rendezvous Sports World (RSW) won a bid for the Kerala-based Kochi Tuskers Kerala franchise. Indian National Congress leader and External Affairs minister Shashi Tharoor was involved in bringing together the various companies in this consortium. At that time, both Modi and Tharoor stated that the minister had no stake in the franchise, and was only facilitating a team for his native state Kerala. On 11 April 2010, when a formal agreement was being signed between BCCI and the Kochi franchise, Modi asked the Kochi representatives about the identities of the sweat equity holders in the franchise. According to Modi, he received "evasive replies", and subsequently, a call from Tharoor instructing him not to probe the identities of Kochi's stakeholders. One of the sweat equity holders was Sunanda Pushkar, a close friend (and later wife) of Shashi Tharoor. Shortly after the agreement was signed, Modi disclosed the names of Kochi's stakeholders via a tweet. Modi alleged that Pushkar's shares were actually a hidden gift to Tharoor. RSW threatened to sue Modi for violating confidentiality agreement, and claimed that Modi was creating problems for Kochi because he wanted other bidders to win. Tharoor denied that he had any financial stake in the Kochi franchise, and stated that his role was limited to offering "encouragement, blessings and expert advise" to the RSW-led group of bidders. Tharoor argued that there was no reason for the investors to bribe him, since he had no influence over the auction. Sunanda Pushkar stated that she would give up her stake in the Kochi franchise. Ultimately, Tharoor had to resign as a minister amid allegations of corruption.

== Expulsion from BCCI and exile in London ==
On 16 April 2010, the representatives of the Kochi franchise complained to BCCI that Lalit Modi had threatened them to give up the franchise. A day after the IPL final on 24 April, BCCI suspended Modi on 22 charges, including bypassing the governing council while taking decisions, not following proper processes, bid rigging, awarding contracts to his friends, accepting kickbacks on a broadcast deal, selling franchises to members of his family, betting and money laundering. Soon after his suspension, Modi moved to London, where his wife Minal's family lived. In London, he hired Carter-Ruck to fight BCCI's charges, and sent out defamation notices of his own. He also spent time expanding his family business in Europe. Modi believed that N Srinivasan, who later became the BCCI President, had masterminded his ouster from BCCI. In 2012, Modi alleged that Srinivasan had fixed the auction of Andrew Flintoff in 2009. He also supported Aditya Verma, the secretary of Cricket Association of Bihar, who was fighting a separate legal battle against Srinivasan.

Meanwhile, the Enforcement Directorate of the Indian government launched investigations in following cases against Modi and other BCCI officials:

- Contravening the provisions of Foreign Exchange Management Act (FEMA) to the extent of ₹ 890 million (a charge against Lalit Modi, BCCI and few other officials). Modi blamed N Srinivasan, who was the treasurer of BCCI at the time.
- Accepting deposit of ₹ 200 million from UK-based Emerging Media (IPL), in contravention of FEMA (charge against Modi, BCCI, N Srinivasan and Niranjan Shah)
- Payment of ₹ 2.43 billion to Cricket South Africa for IPL 2009, in contravention of FEMA (charge against Modi, BCCI, Shashank Manohar and other BCCI officials)
- Payment of US$80 million to World Sports Group (WSG) by Multi Screen Media (MSM), as facilitation fees to withdraw from the telecast rights contract
- Routing of US$25 million from MSM-WSG deal to illegal accounts of Lalit Modi, his associates and political beneficiaries
- Telling selective bidders how much to bid during the first IPL team auction in 2008
- Using illegal money to buy corporate jet through a Cayman Islands company
- Investment of ₹ 100 million by Modi's wife in Indian heritage hotel through a Mauritius-based company
- Other cases related to FEMA violations, including ownership of IPL franchisee, nature of foreign investments, and valuation and transfer of shares

Modi defended himself arguing that he was not individually responsible for the decisions: BCCI and its committees took these decisions collectively. He refused to return to India, stating that there was a threat to his life. The Mumbai Police endorsed his claim, stating that underworld gangsters had threatened him after he refused to pay extortion money. Dawood Ibrahim and his associate Chhota Shakeel had sent hitmen to kill Modi and his family, when the Modis were on a vacation in Thailand.

In 2010, Modi claimed on Twitter that New Zealand cricketer Chris Cairns had been involved in match-fixing during 2008. In March 2012, Cairns successfully sued Modi for making false statements and won $950,000 in damages.

In 2013, a BCCI committee found Modi guilty on 8 charges, which resulted in his expulsion from BCCI. The committee was led by the BCCI vice-president and BJP leader Arun Jaitley; its other members included the Congress leader Jyotiraditya Scindia and Chirayu Amin. The charges against Modi included:

1. Rigging bids: Adding two onerous clauses to the invitation to tender draft without informing the BCCI, to favour two bidders. (Modi claimed that he had verbally informed the BCCI President Shashank Manohar).
2. Threatening a representative of the Kochi Tuskers Kerala to give up their franchise rights or face sanctions
3. Favouring World Sports Group (WSG) for TV rights
4. Failing to disclose links to owners with interests in Internet rights (Guarav Burman, his step-daughter's husband, held a stake in Global Cricket Venture)
5. Misconduct of threatening to "expose certain individuals in the BCCI" via tweets
6. Planning a rival cricket league with clubs in England
7. Awarding theatrical rights to a company without the governing council's approval
8. Signing a free commercial time deal with an agency without the governing council's approval

As a result, BCCI banned Modi for life in 2013.

== Re-election and ouster from RCA ==
In December 2013, the Rajasthan Cricket Association (RCA) held fresh elections. However, the results were postponed 6 times by the Supreme Court due to court cases filed by Kishore Rungta and the BCCI. On 6 May 2014, Lalit Modi was re-elected as the president of Rajasthan Cricket Association (RCA), while residing in London. Immediately after his election, the BCCI banned the RCA and elected an ad hoc body to carry administrative function of RCA. Lalit Modi took the legal route to fight BCCI's declaration.

In March 2014, Modi alleged that the International Cricket Council (ICC) had evidence regarding the existence of spot and match-fixing in the Champions League T20 cricket tournament and that world cricket's governing body was deliberately not making it public.

On 9 March 2015, a group led by Amin Pathan moved a no-confidence motion against Lalit Modi, who was until then, the President of RCA. According to the Rajasthan State Sports Act, a minimum attendance of 23 was required to make a quorum. 23 people attended the meeting, out of whom 17 voted against Modi. Only one vote in Modi's support was counted: five other votes were discarded as disputed. 12 more of Modi's supporters were denied entry into the meeting, on the ground that they were late by 10 minutes. The delay occurred because their vehicles were stopped, and they were beaten with rods by a mob. 5 more votes were discarded as disputed. In the end, Modi was ousted as the President by a controversial 17–1 vote. Pathan denied any role in the attack on Modi's supporters, and suggested that the attack was staged by them as an excuse for their pending defeat.

== "Modigate" ==
In March 2010, while Modi was in London, the Congress-led Indian Government revoked his passport. Modi challenged the decision in the Delhi High Court. The High Court restored Modi's passport in August 2014. In June 2015, British MP Keith Vaz was reported to the parliamentary standards commissioner for lobbying UK immigration officials on behalf of Lalit Modi. It was revealed that Vaz had mentioned a recommendation from Sushma Swaraj in his correspondence with the immigration officials. Modi's wife Minal was diagnosed with breast cancer during 2008–09, and was being treated in Portugal. In 2014, Sushma Swaraj requested the British authorities provide assistance by law of the land. Based on her recommendation, the British authorities provided Modi travel documents on the pretext of signing the consent for his wife's operation, although the same was not a requirement in Portugal.

Modi also revealed that on 25 August 2011, BJP leader Vasundhara Raje (also an opposition leader at that time) signed a document supporting his application to the British authorities. The application, which was never presented to the British authorities, had a secrecy clause that it should not be revealed to the Indian authorities. In her affidavit, Raje had claimed that Modi was a victim of a "political witch hunt" by the Congress. Earlier, in 2013, a Jaipur-based lawyer Poonam Chand Bhandari had filed a public interest litigation in the Delhi high court, claiming that Lalit Modi had transferred millions of rupees to a company owned by Vasundhara Raje and her son Dushyant Singh, using a shell company. Dushyant Singh owns Niyant Heritage Hotels Private Limited (NHHPL), and his mother Vasundhara Raje holds 3,280 shares in the company. In 2008, Lalit Modi's company Anand Heritage Hotels Private Limited (AHHPL) provided an unsecured loan of ₹ 38 million to NHHPL. During 2008–09, AHHPL acquired 815 shares in NHHPL, paying ₹ 96,000 for each share, although the face value of each share was only ₹ 10. NHHPL, which previously had a paid up capital of ₹ 1 million, thus received a total of 116.3 million from AHHPL. In June 2015, the Congress accused Vasundhara Raje of corruption, alleging that she had granted favours to Lalit Modi in exchange for the money. BJP argued that Raje had acted as a friend of Modi, and not in her capacity as a political leader.

The controversy resulting from these revelations was termed as "Modigate" by the Indian media. The opposition parties accused the BJP leaders of shielding Lalit Modi, who was wanted in several cases of financial irregularities in India. Modi's lawyer Mehmood Abdi called the controversy a matter of political vendetta, and claimed that he had been hounded by the Congress ever since the Shashi Tharoor-Sunanda Pushkar controversy of 2010.

As a result, Interpol, the international law enforcement agency, issued a light blue notice against Modi to be arrested on Indian soil. However, in June 2015, and despite the Interpol notice, Modi took a picture with ex-Interpol Chief Ronald Noble and uploaded it to his Instagram account while attending the El Clasico match in Barcelona. In the post, he referred to Noble as his “brother”. The incident caused significant media backlash within India as many began to raise questions about the connection between men with criminal reputations like Modi and international law enforcement. Yet Noble, who served as the head of Interpol from 2000 to 2014, denied any knowledge of Modi's criminal activities despite evidence that Modi was on an Interpol watch list for some time.

One month later, a series of emails revealed Modi's further ties with Noble and his brother James. Indian media released a set of emails exchanged between the three men between 21 and 26 January 2014, discussing a property worth $365,000 in the United States. Ronald Noble explained that his brother and Modi entered into a joint business venture around the property, under which Modi would purchase the house, while James Noble would maintain it at his own expense. Modi and James Noble would split the profits equally once the property was sold. Noble stated that there was no conflict of interest, because at the time of this deal he was not an Interpol employee and Modi was of no interest to Interpol. As of 2015, Lalit Modi has not been convicted of any charges as part of the ED investigation. In March 2025, he claimed that he had not been issued any extradition notice against him, as claimed by some media houses.

The Enforcement Directorate of India had requested Interpol to issue a global warrant against Lalit Modi. However, in 2017, the Interpol which had been delaying the issuance, rejected this request.

== Awards and recognitions ==
- On 9 April 2006, Mike Atherton described Lalit Modi as arguably ‘the most important cricket administrator in the world today’
- In March 2008, Lalit Modi was listed among India's 30 most powerful people by India Today magazine
- In July 2008 he featured on the cover of Sports Pro and was hailed as the Best Rain Maker (money maker) for any sports body in the history of sports globally
- In July 2008, Time magazine ranked Lalit Modi 16th in a list of the world's best sports executives
- On 25 September 2008, Lalit Modi was named ‘Brand Builder of the Year’ by Asia Brand Conference
- On 26 September 2008, Lalit Modi was presented with ‘The Consumer Award for Transforming Cricket in India’ by CNBC Awaaz
- On 6 October 2008, Lalit Modi was named ‘The Most Innovative Business Leader in India’ by NDTV Profit
- On 24 October 2008, Lalit Modi was awarded for ‘Excellence in Innovation’ at the Frost & Sullivan Growth Excellence Awards
- In October 2008, Business Week ranked Lalit Modi 19th in a list of 25 most powerful global sports figures
- In August 2009, Forbes magazine described the IPL as ‘the world's hottest sports league’ – a remarkable accolade from a US magazine less than a year after the IPL's launch
- On 28 December 2009, Business Standard named Lalit Modi as one of the ‘Game Changers of the Decade’
- In February 2010, Sports Illustrated named Lalit Modi as the 2nd Most Powerful Person in Indian Sports
