= Krishan Kumar Modi =

Indian businessman (1940–2019)

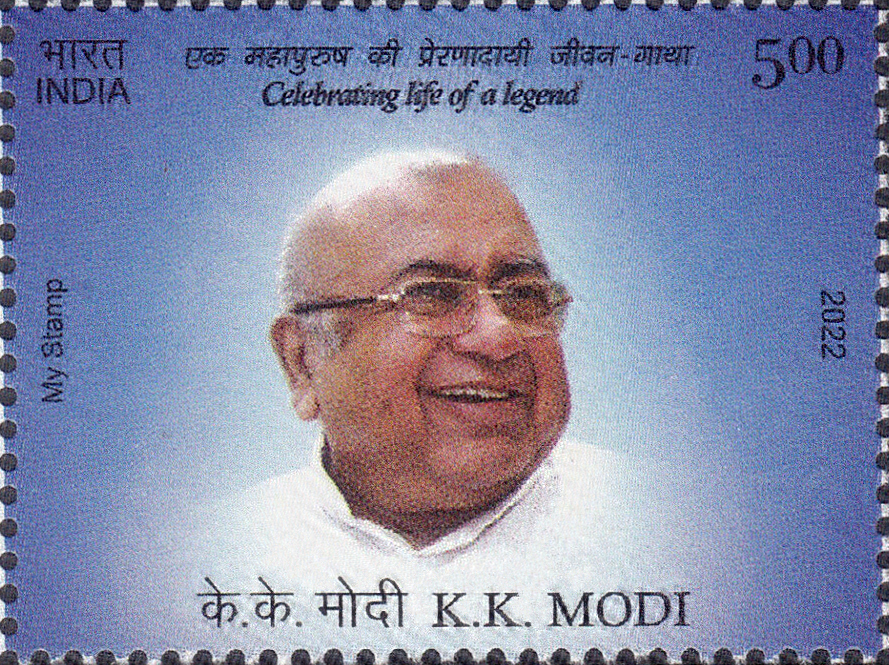
- Modi on a 2022 stamp of India
- Born: 27 August 1940; Patiala, Patiala State, British India
- Died: 2 November 2019 (aged 79)
- Occupation: Businessman
- Known for: Modi Enterprises
- Spouse: Bina Modi (m. 1961)
- Children: Charu; Lalit; Samir
- Parents: Gujarmal Modi (father); Dayawati Modi (mother)
- Relatives: Bhupendra Kumar Modi (brother)

Krishan Kumar Modi (27 August 1940 – 2 November 2019), also known as K. K. Modi, was an Indian businessman and the president of the Modi Enterprises.

== Background ==
Modi was born in August 1940 in Patiala, the eldest son of Rai Bahadur Gujarmal Modi and his second wife Dayawati Modi. Rai Bahadur Gujarmal Modi was the founder of the Modi Group. He started his first sugar factory in 1933 and gradually built up a vast business empire by venturing into various industrial sectors in the period before and after independence. The young K.K. Modi thus grew up in exciting times, when his father was building the family fortunes, and the country was grappling with major social and political changes.

== Career ==
In 1959, at the age of just 19, Krishan Kumar accompanied his uncle Kedaarnath Modi (Gujarmal's step-brother) to several European countries, to explore the possibility of purchasing the latest textile machinery to produce higher quality cloth. Managing the textile production in the silk mill was the next project entrusted to him. In 1965, he was appointed the Vice-President of Modipon—the then newly established nylon yarn manufacturing unit in Modinagar.

In 1976, Gujarmal Modi died. KK Modi then provided leadership as patriarch of the Modi family and the group remained united until 1989, when the various businesses of the Modi Group of companies were divided between the five sons of Gujarmal Modi. He has since then moved into cigarette manufacturing, pesticides, leather, industrial chemical technology and other sectors. He was also considered to be India's 89th richest man in 2012, according to Forbes.

Modi has served in the following positions:

- President (Confederation of Asia Pacific Chambers of Commerce & Industry – CACCI)
- Patron (Indian Chamber of Commerce & Industry – ICCI)

== Personal life ==
Modi is one of the eleven children (five sons and six daughters) of Rai Bahadur Gujarmal Modi, founder of the Modi Group, by his second wife, Dayawati Devi. His birth in 1940 was greeted with unprecedented joy in the Modi household, because the family had pined for a son for over two decades. His father's first wife, Rajban Devi, had borne as many as ten children, but every single one of them had died in childbirth or infancy. Finally, in 1932, at the behest of his ailing first wife and family elders, Gujarmal Modi had taken a second wife, Dayawati Devi. Several daughters were then born, before the birth of KK Modi, the long-awaited heir, in 1940. KK Modi's younger brothers are Vinay Kumar, Satish Kumar, Bhupendra Kumar Modi and Umesh Kumar.

Modi was married to Bina Modi on 4 December 1961 at the age of 21. The match was arranged by their parents in the traditional Indian way. Bina is a cooking enthusiast who runs the Ego Thai restaurant in New Delhi. They have three children, a daughter named Charu Bhartia, and two sons, Lalit Modi and Samir Modi. Charu, who handles the Modi group's educational venture, is the mother of Priyal Bhartia (daughter) and Ashrant Bhartia (son). KK Modi's second son, Samir Modi, handles the group's ventures in the retail and cosmetics sector. He is married to Shivani and is the father of two daughters, Jayati and Vedika.

KK Modi's elder son is the controversial Lalit Modi, the flamboyant cricket administrator famous for creating the Indian Premier League, who is wanted by the Indian authorities on various charges and lives in London.
