= Nigel Foulkes =

British businessman

Sir Nigel Gordon Foulkes FRSA (29 August 1919 – 16 August 2013) was a British business man, managing director of Rank Xerox and Chairman of the British Airports Authority, the Civil Aviation Authority, and other companies and organizations.

== Early life ==
The son of Louis Augustine Foulkes and his wife Winifred, Foulkes was educated at Gresham's School and Balliol College, Oxford, where he held a scholarship and graduated BA, later promoted to MA. He joined the Royal Air Force in 1940 and by June 1941 was an Aircraftman 2nd Class. In August 1941 he was graded as a Pilot Officer on probation and in March 1942 was transferred to the RAF Regiment. In January 1945 he was promoted from Flying Officer to Flight Lieutenant and returned to civilian life later that year.

Foulkes was a nephew of the Canadian tennis player J. F. Foulkes and a nephew by marriage of the American poet Rosemary Thomas. His grandfather, Augustine Lempriere Foulkes, was vicar of Steventon.

== Career ==
After the Second World War, Foulkes was production manager at H. P. Bulmer from 1947 to 1951, then until 1956 was a management consultant with P. E. Consulting Group. He held executive and boardroom posts with Birfield and Greaves & Thomas and then from 1961 to 1964 was assistant to the chairman of International Nickel Ltd. In 1964 he joined Rank Xerox as assistant managing director and was its managing director from 1967 to 1970.

In a speech in 1968, Foulkes said that in 1961 Xerox had had "a five-years' lead over the rest of the world", with copying products which had no serious competition. But "you cannot strike oil and not expect other prospectors to sink wells".

Foulkes was Chairman of FOBAS Ltd (Foreign Business Advisory Service) from 1970 to 1976, the British Airports Authority, 1972 to 1977 (succeeding Sir Peter Masefield), the Civil Aviation Authority, 1977 to 1982, Equity Capital, 1983 to 1990, and ECI International Management Ltd, 1987 to 1991. He was also a director of the Charterhouse Group from 1972 to 1985.

== Personal life ==
In 1940, Foulkes married Ann Davison, daughter of J. A. Davison MC, Chief Constable of Kent, and they had one son and one daughter. In October 1942, his father-in-law killed himself in a wood near Maidstone with a pistol shot to the head, shortly after resigning his office. The marriage ended in divorce, and on 7 February 1948, in Bournemouth, Foulkes married secondly Mary Elisabeth Walker, the daughter of Ewart B. Walker, of Toronto. Later in 1948, his first wife also married again. Foulkes's mother was then Mrs B. C. Lupton. His second wife died in 1995.

He died on 16 August 2013, aged 93.

== Honours ==
Foulkes was awarded a knighthood in the 1980 New Year Honours and on 12 February 1980 was knighted by Elizabeth II.

By 1989 he was a Fellow of the Royal Society of Arts and a Companion of the British Institute of Management.
