= Virali Modi =

Disability rights activist from India

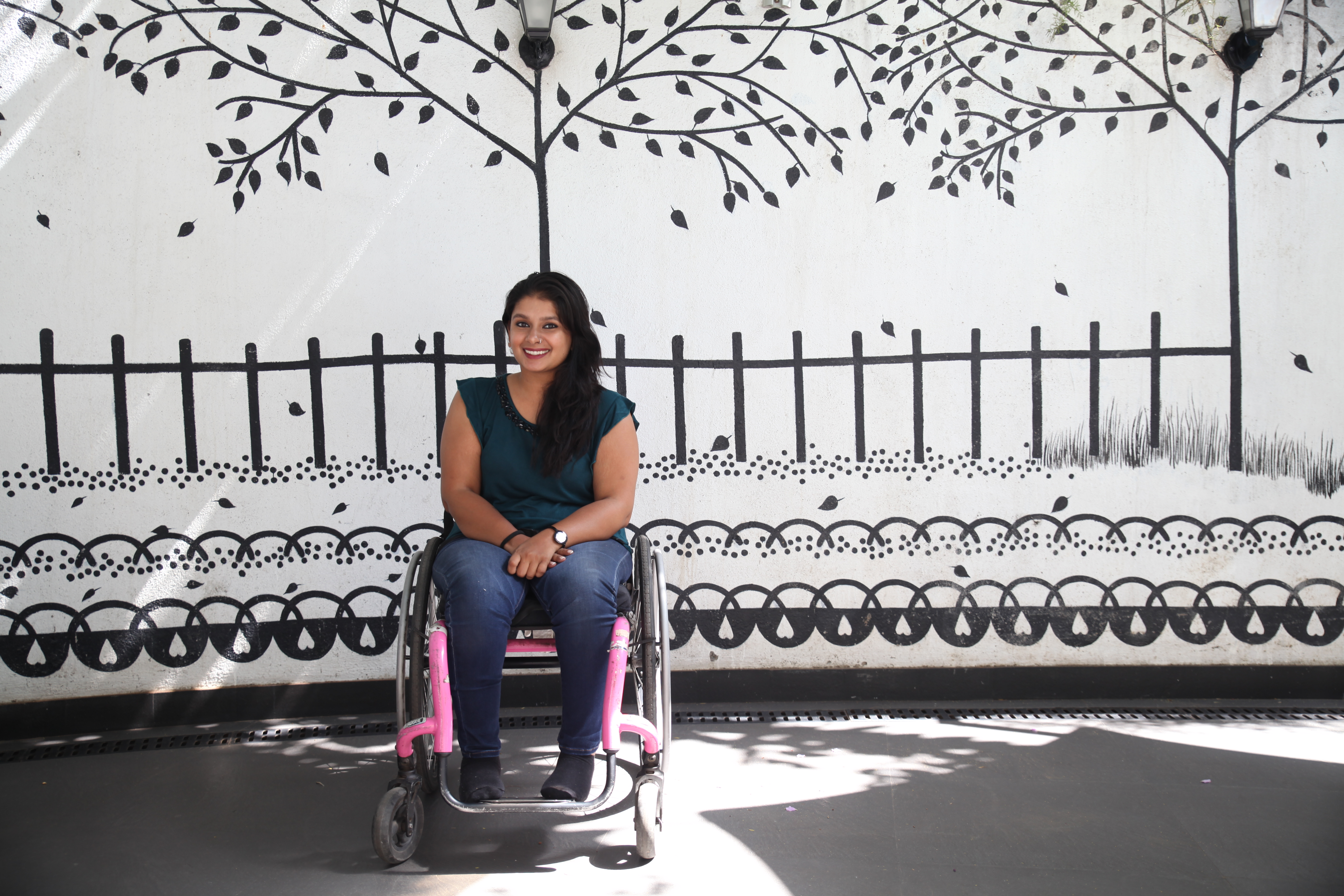

Virali Modi (born 29 September 1991) is a disability rights activist and motivational speaker from India. She spent much of her youth in the United States, but after a visit to India she entered a coma due to contracting malaria. She survived, but could no longer walk. She came second in the Miss Wheelchair India contest in 2014 and as a result gathered a large following on social media. She began a Change.org petition titled "Implement Disabled Friendly Measures in Indian Railways." Her efforts to make railways more accessible landed her in "100 Women (BBC)" for 2017. She has given multiple TEDx talks on her experiences and struggles due to her disability. She has started campaigns to promote accessibility for disabled individuals one titled #MyTrainToo which she began in 2017 as well as another titled #RampMyRestaurant.
