= Charu Modi =

Indian entrepreneur

- Born: 28 October 1962 (age 63); New Delhi, India
- Education: B.Com (Lady Shri Ram College) & MBA (Thunderbird School of Global Management)
- Occupations: Promoter (Modi Enterprises), Co-Founder and Chancellor (KK Modi University) & Executive Director (Indofil Industries)
- Children: 2
- Father: Krishan Kumar Modi

Charu Modi is an Indian entrepreneur and the promoter and shareholder of the K.K. Modi group. She is the granddaughter of the late Rai Bahadur Gujarmal Modi and the daughter of Krishan Kumar Modi and Bina Modi. Modi is the co-founder and chancellor of KK Modi University (KKMU), an educational institute offering internationally accredited courses on Indian campuses. Modi is also the elder sister of Lalit Modi, the former Indian cricket administrator and the founder of the Indian Premier League (IPL) and Samir Modi, who manages the Modi Group's retail, network marketing and cosmetics ventures.

== Personal life ==
Born in New Delhi, Modi went to St. Mary’s Convent in Nainital and completed her bachelor's degree in commerce from Lady Shri Ram College in the Indian capital. In 1996, at the age of 33, she left India to attend an MBA program at American Graduate School of International Management in Arizona (later renamed as Thunderbird School of Global Management) and then worked for Kaiser Permanente and Estée Lauder in the U.S. for three years.

== Business career ==
Modi entered into business in the U.S. after noticing manpower shortages in critical areas of business during her employment with Kaiser Permanente. She is the founder and promoter of Modi Healthcare Placement, a nurse recruitment organisation in the U.S. She also serves as executive director at Modi Enterprises and Indofil Industries. In March 2015, Modi and her father laid the foundation stone for K.K. Modi University in Mahmara; Modi serves as the chancellor.
