= Laura Modi =

Co-founder and CEO of Bobbie

- Born: 1985 or 1986 (age 40–41); Westport, Ireland
- Occupation: CEO of Bobbie

Laura Modi is an Irish-American executive and the co-founder and CEO of Bobbie. Before Bobbie, she was director of hospitality at Airbnb.

== Early career ==
Modi began her career at Portwest, a workwear and personal protective equipment business run by her family and founded by her great-grandfather in Ireland.

== Bobbie ==
Modi originally had the idea to found an organic infant formula company in 2016, when she was seeking formula to feed her first child that excluded palm oil and corn syrup from the ingredients. Over the next 18 months, she researched the industry and possible recipes, finding that the last significant U.S. Food and Drug Administration update to formula nutritional standards occurred in the 1980s. Modi self-funded the company with funds from savings and consultancy work Modi hired her past Airbnb colleague Sarah Hardy, who joined as co-founder in 2019.

In May 2019, an early pilot of Bobbie's formula led to a FDA inspection and a recall due to noncompliant labeling. Modi updated Bobbie's supply chain, partnering with Perrigo on manufacturing, and relaunched its "European-style" infant formula in compliance with FDA guidelines in January 2021. Bobbie's revenue grew to $100 million by 2023, even though Modi had made the decision to pause new customer registrations for six months during the 2022 United States infant formula shortage. In July 2023, Modi led Bobbie's acquisition of Nature's One, another formula brand, funded in part by a $70 million funding round raised by Modi.

As part of Bobbie's workplace culture, Modi prioritizes providing robust leave and job security to new parents. She also set up Bobbie For Change, the company's advocacy arm.

== Recognition ==
Modi was named one of Time’s Women of the Year for 2025.
