= Ishwar Chandra Shukla =

Indian politician

Ishwar Chandra Shukla ( 3 January 1948 - 26 September 2020 ) was an Indian politician and former Member of Legislative assembly. He represented the Naugarh Constituency of Uttar Pradesh and was the Vice President of the Uttar Pradesh Congress Committee.

Shri Ishwar Chandra Shukla was born in Siddharth Nagar district of UP. He had an M.A., Llb and B.ed degree from Allahabad University and Lucknow University.

Ishwar Chandra Shukla was active in politics since the early 1970s and joined the Youth Wing of Congress during his early days.

During his political career he had held various important posts in the Congress Party. He was well known for a clean sheet with zero criminal cases until date and also for his active participation in the legislative debates and discussions.

He was the Member of Legislative assembly from 2007 to 2012 from Naugarh.
