= Spice Global =

Indian conglomerate

- Type: Private
- Industry: Conglomerate
- Predecessor: Modi Corp; MCorp Global; Spice Corp
- Founded: 1980; 46 years ago
- Founder: Bhupendra Kumar Modi
- Defunct: 2018; 8 years ago
- Headquarters: Singapore, India
- Area served: Worldwide
- Key people: Ozi Amanat (CIO)
- Total assets: ▲US$ 2 billion (2011)
- Number of employees: 10,000
- Website: Spice Global

DigiSpice (aka Spice Global) was an Indian conglomerate headquartered in Singapore. The company operates in the sectors of telecom, finance, entertainment and technology. They operate internationally in Los Angeles, New York, Kuala Lumpur, London, Dubai, Nepal, Bangladesh, Uganda, Tanzania, Zimbabwe, Sri Lanka and Shenzhen.

In 2014, the company's aggregated assets totalled US$2 billion with over 10,000 employees worldwide.

Spice Global is planning to offer full-fledged banking service, with focus on smart banking, which is showing a 227% annual growth, to its customers. It has applied to the Reserve Bank of India (RBI) for a license. The company is already offering financial services through Wall Street Finance, which has 6,000 sub-agents across India, including Vijaya Bank, ICICI Bank and Kotak.

In 2014, the company made an aggressive bid to acquire the American business magazine Forbes Media, from the Forbes family and the private equity group Elevation Partners. Ozi Amanat valued the company and acquisition at $300–$500m and quoted it as one of the world’s most brilliant brands. The bid for Forbes was short listed as the 3 top bidders for acquisition, beating Time Inc, Fox, Bloomberg, Warren Buffett and other major investors.

== History ==
Spice Global was established in 1980 by B. K. Modi under the name, Modi Corp. Later, the company came to be known as MCorp Global and Spice Corp, before it finally became Spice Global.

In 2009, a bid between Virgin Mobile and Spice Global was held for the 3G contract of Mahanagar Telephone Nigam Limited. The deal was eventually called off due to regulation issues and a deal was not signed for the network.

Spice Telecom was sold to Idea Cellular in 2008.

The company abandoned plans for a US$ 500 million IPO when the Dubai Financial Market General Index dropped 65 percent in 2009. The decision where to hold the IPO was withheld from the general public with Singapore, Hong Kong, London, and the US as strongly speculated possibilities. However, plans in 2012 revealed Spice Global would be listed in London. Modi expects to raise US$ 1 billion in the listing where London has agreed to the listing.

In May 2023, the Times of India reported that Spice Money, a subsidiary of Spice Global, was partnering with Boston Consulting Group (BCG) to strengthen its reach across India. Spice Money was founded in 2015 and aims to develop financial strategies for rural customers in India in saving, credit, and commerce. The partnership with BCG will seek to identify financial areas that demand greater attention and support in rural communities.

== Proposed Operations ==
Spice Global Group plans to expand its footprint in Malaysia. Spice Global has a presence in Malaysia in the field of mobile software and hardware technology through Spice CSL. Spice Global had earlier taken over the Malaysian mobile company, CSL. The company did a business worth over US$100 million in Malaysia in 2012 and hopes to breach US$200 million (RM618 million) by 2014. This year, Spice CSL will launch two new smartphones and one tablet in Malaysia. The company is currently in talks with Malayan Banking Bhd (Maybank) and Bank Islam Malaysia Bhd for strategic partnerships for its proposed banking business.

Spice Global is interested in entering the Malaysian healthcare sector and is in talks with IHH Healthcare Bhd for a partnership. The company also plans to buy a property in Putrajaya.

== Awards and honors ==
- 2007 Golden Peacock certificates for innovative products/services
- Global premier of the World's First Movie Phone
- 2008 Peoples' phone at the World Mobile Congress, Barcelona
- Product of the Year Innovation Award 2010
- Spice Mobility ranked 10 in Asia's 200 Best Under A Billion

== Subsidiaries ==
- Si2i Mobility
  - Si2i - Representing mobility businesses outside India. Listed in Singapore Stock Exchange (SGX: M09)
  - S Mobility Limited – Representing Mobility businesses in India. Listed in NSE (NSE: SPICEMOBIL) and BSE (BSE: 517214)
- Spice Retail - Telecommunications retail and accessory chain (741 stores in 136 cities)
- Spice Digital - Business solutions for telecom operators
- Spice CSL - Global Spice Mobility and is based in Malaysia. It enjoys a market share of 18% in Malaysia.
- Spice Enfotainment
  - Spice World Mall in Noida, Uttar Pradesh
  - Spice Studios - Film production company
  - Spice Investment and Finance Advisors - A 62% controlling stake in Wall Street Finance Limited (India)
  - Spice Innovative Technologies - is headquartered in Singapore, provides voice, data and computing services.
  - Spice BPO Services - operates in the domestic on-shore BPO
- Spice Foundation
  - Varanasi and Rampur DMA Schools
  - Saket City Hospital, South Delhi

== Board of directors ==
- B. K. Modi aka Dr. M, Chairman
- K. N.
- Vangal Ranganathan
- Preeti Malhotra
- Chhavi Leekha
- Ozi Amanat
- Anitha Reddy Chadha
