= Gadariya =

Gadariya गदरिया
- Village development committee
- Location in Nepal
- Coordinates: 28.65°N 80.76°E
- Country: Nepal
- Province: Sudurpashchim Province
- District: Kailali District

Population (1991)
  - Total: 7,355
- Time zone: UTC+5:45 (Nepal Time)

Gadariya, named after people of Gadaria caste, is a village development committee in Kailali District in Sudurpashchim Province of western Nepal. At the time of the 1991 Nepal census it had a population of 7355 living in 726 individual households.
