= Modi Enterprises =

Indian business conglomerate

Modi Industries Limited
- Trade name: Modi Group of Companies
- Formerly: Modi Enterprises (1932 - 2024)
- Type: Private
- Industry: Conglomerate
- Founded: 1932; 94 years ago in Delhi, India
- Founder: Gujarmal Modi
- Key people: Lalit Modi (President & Managing Director); Samir Modi (managing director); Ruchir Modi (executive director)
- Products: Consumer products, multi-level marketing, cigarettes, food and beverages, fashion
- Brands: List: Beacon Travels; Ego-Thai; Ego Italian; Godfrey Phillips; Indofil; Modicare; Modi Healthcare; Pan Vilas
- Number of employees: 28,000 approximately
- Website: www.modi.com

Modi Industries Limited is an Indian business conglomerate based in New Delhi, India. The US $2.8 billion group, consisting of Godfrey Phillips India, Indofil Industries Ltd., Modicare Limited, has a diversified business portfolio including cigarettes manufacturing, education, agricultural chemicals, personal care, tea and beverages, entertainment, consumer products, multi-level marketing, and gourmet restaurants.

== History ==
Gujarmal Modi (1902–1976) founded the Modi Group, beginning with a small, family-run business, then expanding from 1933 onwards with companies such as Modi Sugar, Modi Vanaspati Mfr Co., Modi Industries Ltd, ModiLuft and Modi Rubber, Modi Paints, Modi Oils, Modi Electrodes, Modi Lanterns and Torch works, Tube wells/drilling, Modi Distillery, Modi Steels, Industrial Gases, Modi Spinning and Wvg. Mills Co. Ltd., Modi Yarn Mills, Modi Threads, Modi Soap, and Modi Carpets etc.

By the time Modi's brother Kedar Nath Modi joined the company, the Modi Group was India's seventh largest conglomerate. The company had become the center of the eponymously renamed city of Modinagar. Modi died in 1976, and KN Modi succeeded him with the help of Modi's five sons and his own three sons who later joined the family business. The founder of the company did not leave a will and, although the family remained united under KN Modi's leadership, this oversight would later cause a rift that threatened to destroy the company.

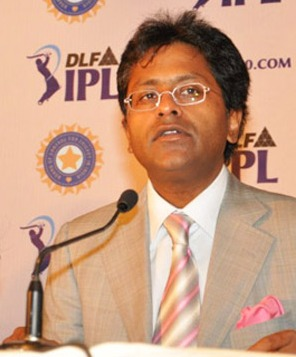
Lalit Modi, the President and MD of Modi Enterprises and the Executive Director of Godfrey Phillips India

In April 2010, Krishan Kumar Modi, former chairman of Modi Group, announced that his eldest son Lalit Modi will succeed him as the head of Modi Group's flagship business Godfrey Phillips India (GPI). Lalit Modi is the founder of the Indian Premier League (IPL). According to KK Modi, his children (Lalit Modi, Samir Modi and Charu Bhartia Modi) will have the obligation to appoint his successor, and only by a unanimous vote. Otherwise, the group will be sold off with the profits from the sale shared equally among them.

In June 2011, The Modi Group announced that it was planning to acquire majority control in Godfrey Phillips India from American tobacco company Philip Morris. Both groups had a 36% share in the company until in 2009, Modi Group acquired an additional 11% stake in GPI from Philip Morris, taking its share to 47%. As per the Joint Venture agreement, Modi Group has the right to take its holdings up to 51% by buying further into Philip Morris' holdings to gain majority control of the company. The deal brought Philip Morris' stake down to 21%.

Krishan Kumar Modi, former chairman of Modi Group died at the age of 79 on 2 November 2019.

== Brands ==
The company's brands include Beacon Travels, Ego-Thai, Ego Italian, Godfrey Phillips, Indofil, Modicare, Colorbar, Modi Healthcare, Pan Vilas, Coearth and 24 Seven.
