= Reeta Ishwar =

Pakistani politician

Member of the National Assembly of Pakistan
- In office 1 June 2013 – 31 May 2018
- Constituency: Reserved seat for women

Personal details
- Party: Pakistan Muslim League (F)

Reeta Ishwar (Urdu: ریتا ایشور) is a Pakistani politician who had been a member of the National Assembly of Pakistan from June 2013 to May 2018.

== Political career ==
She was elected to the National Assembly of Pakistan as a candidate of Pakistan Muslim League (F) on a reserved seat for women from Sindh in the 2013 Pakistani general election.
