= Godfrey Phillips India =

Tobacco manufacturer

Godfrey Phillips India Ltd.
- Type: Public
- Traded as: NSE: GODFRYPHLP; BSE: 500163
- Industry: Tobacco
- Predecessor: Abdulla & Company
- Founded: 1844; 182 years ago in London
- Founder: Godfrey Phillips
- Headquarters: Delhi, India (since 1967)
- Area served: Worldwide
- Key people: Bina Modi (President & MD); Sharad Aggarwal (CEO)
- Products: Cigarettes, Tobacco leaf, Candies, Chewing gum
- Brands: List: Cavanders; Four Square; Marlboro; Red & White; Jaisalmer
- Revenue: ▲₹ 44.252 billion (2022)
- Operating income: ▲₹7.896 billion (2022)
- Net income: ▲₹6.083 billion (2022)
- Total assets: ▲₹45.384 billion (2022)
- Total equity: ▲₹31.883 billion (2022)
- Owner: Modi Enterprises (51%); Philip Morris International (21%)
- Number of employees: 1,045 (2022)
- Parent: Modi Enterprises
- Website: godfreyphillips.com

Godfrey Phillips India Ltd. (GPI) is a British-founded tobacco manufacturer headquartered in India. It is now a part of Modi Enterprises. The company is a major player in the domestic cigarette industry. In 2013-2014 it reported an annual turnover of ₹42.2 billion (equivalent to ₹74 billion or US$760 million in 2026). It has expanded from tobacco to include tea, pan masala, and confectioner. Its operations are primarily located in the northern and western parts of India, but it has recently expanded into West Bengal and the southern part of the country. It sells some of the most popular cigarette brands, such as Four Square, Red and White, Cavanders, Tipper, and North Pole.

The firm was originally established in London in 1844. GPI was one of the first British companies to mass-produce cigarettes.

GPI manufactures and sells cigarettes, smoking tobacco and cigars, apart from having a non-tobacco line of products released in 2009 that include confectionery. GPI is the flagship company of Modi Enterprises.

The company had an annual turnover of approximately ₹29.26 billion (equivalent to ₹36 billion or US$370 million in 2026) as of March 2021. The company also has business interests in pan masala, chewing and confectionery products. The company also manufactures and distributes Marlboro in India under a licence agreement with Philip Morris International.

== History ==
The house of Godfrey Phillips was established in 1844 at Bevis Marks in Aldgate, London, by cigar manufacturer Godfrey Phillips, who was the eldest son of Henry Phillips, born in the country fields outside London in October 1826. When his sons were old enough and working in the business, the firm's name was changed to Godfrey Phillips & Sons, Ltd.

On 21 August 1900 Godfrey Phillips died and in 1908 the partnership was sold, and Godfrey Phillips, Limited, was formed. The first directors were the partners- Joseph Phillips, chairman, Philip Phillips, David Phillips, Spencer Phillips and Arthur Phillips. Later, the business was listed on the London Stock Exchange as Godfrey Phillips Plc.

In 1936, Godfrey Phillips (India), Limited, was created; the building of native-style architecture was devoted to the manufacture of the group's brands Cavander's, De Reszke and Greys.

In 1967, Godfrey Phillips Ltd. of London made an arrangement with International Tobacco Co. who opened a factory in Northern India to manufacture on the company's behalf. Upon the merger with D. Macropolo & Co. Ltd., International Tobacco Co. Ltd. became its subsidiary.

In 1968, Philip Morris Inc. made a takeover bid for Godfrey Phillips Plc and the family shareholders were unable to prevent the company being sold.

Godfrey Phillips India has manufacturing facilities at Rabale in Navi Mumbai, and two units in Ghaziabad (near Delhi). They also have an R&D centre in Mumbai and a food R&D in Ghaziabad, and a tobacco-buying unit in Guntur (Andhra Pradesh).

Godfrey Phillips India has an International Business Division, for international export of its own cigarette brands, cut & blended tobacco, tobacco leaf and providing technical services and contract manufacturing.

In 2011, Modi Enterprises acquire majority control in Godfrey Philips from Philip Morris, Philip Morris' stake down to 21%.

== Brands and products ==
GPI manufactures a variety of products related to tobacco through its subsidiary brands. Godfrey Phillips India also manufactures and distributes cigarette brand Marlboro under a licence agreement with Philip Morris International Inc. Likewise, the company also has a non-tobacco range of products.

Product	Brand/s
Cigarettes	Cavanders, Four Square, Marlboro (owned by Philip Morris), Red & White, Stellar, North Pole, Tipper
Tobacco leaf	– (Note: GPI is tobacco provider of companies such as Philip Morris, ITG, JTI, Eastern Co., European Tobacco, Libyan Tobacco Company and RNTA.)
Candies	Funda Goli
Pan masala	Pan Vilas
Vapes	Verge

== Collectables ==
=== Cigarette cards ===
Godfrey Phillips Ltd. also produced a variety of cigarette cards to advertise their products, with topics such as film actresses, animals, aircraft, famous people from history, cricketers and footballers amongst others. The first cards set was launched in 1904 and featured anonymous pin-up girls.

In the 1920s, the company took advantage of the rise popularity of association football trading cards in those times, releasing football collections in 1920, 1922 and 1923. Godfrey Phillips Ltd. issued a series of 1,100 football cards of the first collection, followed by 2,462 in 1922 and 940 in 1923.

The outbreak of the World War II caused a severe shortage of paper, and tobacco companies were forced to bring an end to the production of cigarette cards.

Godfrey Phillips cigarette cards
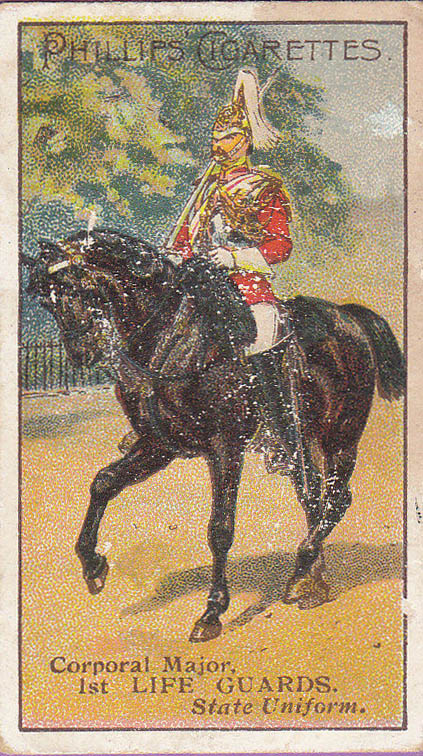
Corporal Mayor, "Types of British Soldiers", 1900

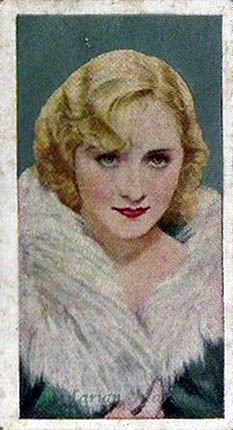
Marian Marsh, "Film Favorites", 1934

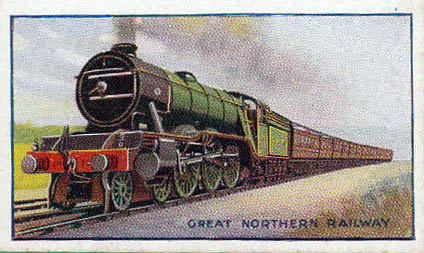
Great Northern Railway locomotive, 1934

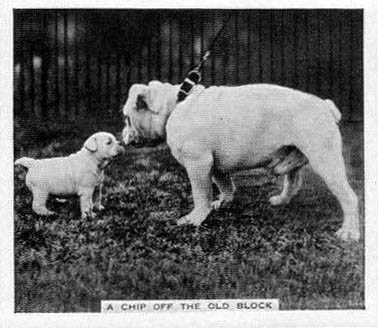
Dogs, "Animals" series, 1935

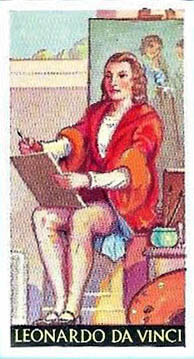
Leonardo da Vinci, "Famous Minors" series, 1936

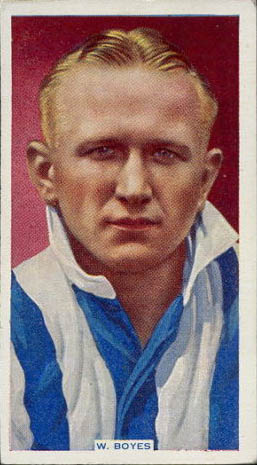
Walter Boyes of West Bromwich, 1936

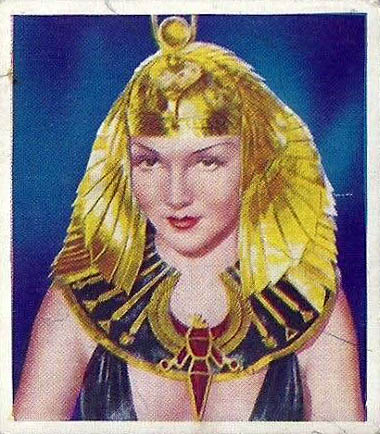
Claudette Colbert as Cleopatra, 1938

=== Flat toy soldiers ===
In the 1930s, the Godfrey Phillips' brand 'Greys' included tin alloy flat-cast toy soldiers in place of cigarette cards. These included German-manufactured Ochel figures depicting horsemen of the Royal Scots Greys cavalry regiment regiment of the British Army at a nonstandard 28mm scale.

== See also ==
- Smoking in India
- ITC Limited, the largest tobacco company
- Smoking in Bollywood
- Modi Enterprises
- Association football trading card
