= Ishwar Modi =

Indian sociologist (1940–2017)

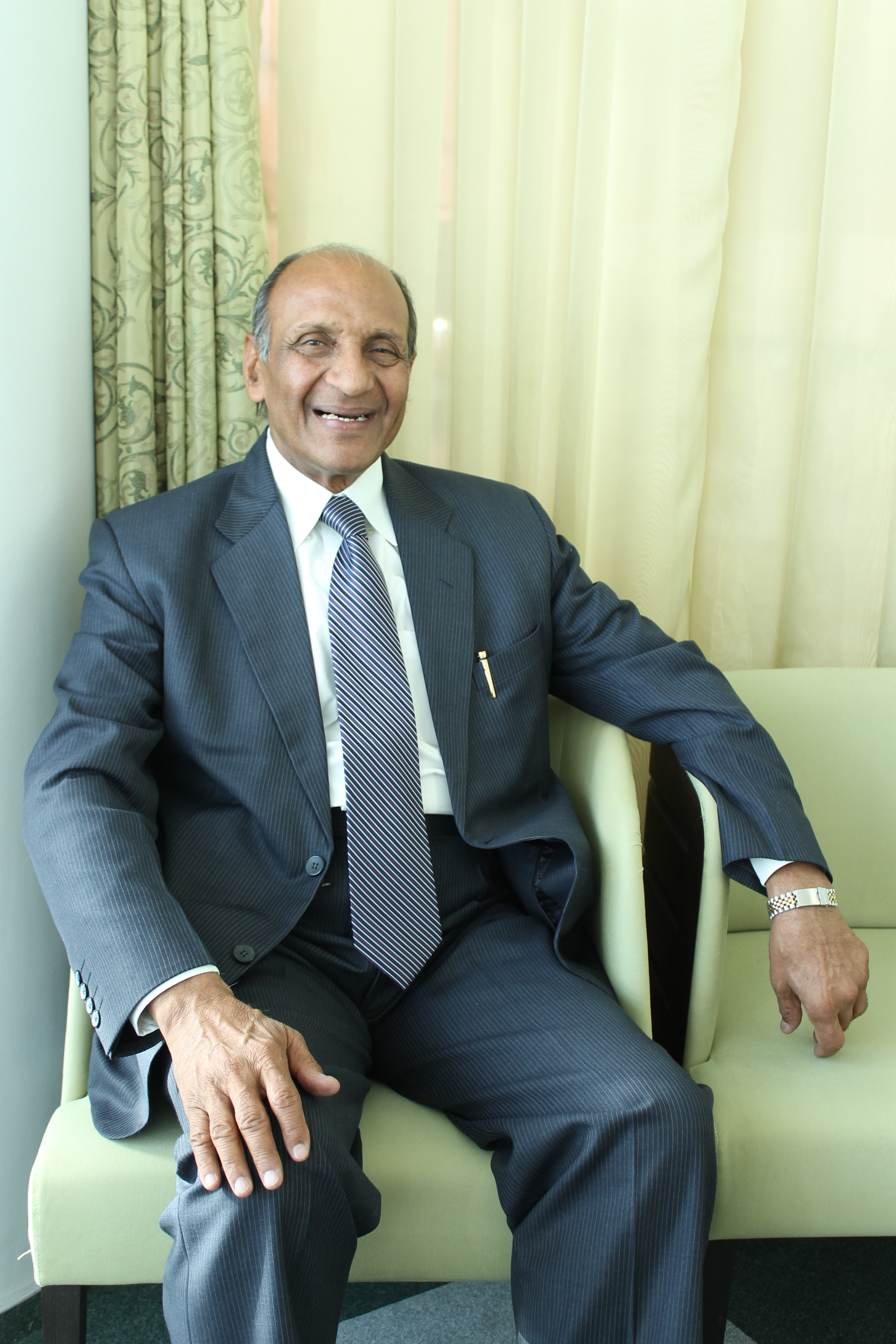

Ishwar Modi (12 December 1940 - 23 May 2017) was an Indian sociologist and a pioneer of leisure studies in India. His work in this field has been widely reviewed in both India and abroad. He completed his master's degree in sociology and PhD from University of Rajasthan, Jaipur. He also worked for his PhD under the title Leisure, Mass Media and Social Structure (1985) at the Centre for the Study of Social Systems, Jawaharlal Nehru University, New Delhi, with a distinguished scholar Professor Yogendra Singh before joining the Department of Sociology at the University of Rajasthan as assistant professor of sociology (September 1974).

Modi received the Lifetime Achievement Award in 2015 from the Indian Sociological Society, which is the highest and most coveted award given by the Society to honour Indian Sociologists who have made profound and exceptional contributions in the field of sociology and thereby enriched the discipline of sociology and enhanced the capability and respectability of its professionals.

== Career ==
Modi has conducted major research projects related to leisure, drug abuse, adult literacy, women, children, youth, senior citizens, theatre and tourism. He has collaborated in several international research projects and has contributed book chapters in international publications.

More than a dozen research students have been awarded PhD under his supervision for their doctoral work, from within the country and abroad. He himself has conducted extensive field work in urban, rural and tribal areas in connection with the various research projects. As a keen student of theory and methodology, he is interested in social categories as children, youth, women, workers, backward classes and the old. He is also interested in the areas of poverty, ecology, health, population, movements, voting behaviour and human rights.

This apart, he has extensively travelled, participated, chaired and co-chaired at several international conferences and spoken on "Leisurology", "Tourism", "Youth" and "Mass Media" in several universities and conferences in Asia, Europe and the United States of America. Many important universities in Canada, and US have invited him to speak on his work on "Leisurology".

Modi accorded the responsibility to organise the first-ever World Leisure Congress in India on "Leisure and Social Change" as Organising Secretary on behalf of Research Committee on Leisure of the [International Sociological Association] (ISA RC 13) in November 1989 at Jaipur.

Elected vice-president of the Research Committee on Leisure of the International Sociological Association (ISA) first for the period 1990?1994 and then again for 1998–2002, and 2002–2006.

Invited to chair sessions at all the congresses held abroad and attended all the previous four World Congresses of Sociology held respectively in New Delhi (1986), Madrid, Spain (1990), Bielefeld, Germany (1994), and Montreal, Canada (1998).

Elected on board of directors of WLRA for several terms (1991–93, 1993–96, 1996–99). The World Leisure and Recreation Association (WLRA), now christened as World Leisure, (which is the largest international body of leisure professionals having consultative status with UN and UNESCO).

Dr. Modi remained Director at the Regional Centre, Jaipur of Kota Open-University, Kota during 1991–92; and (now since 2002) Vardhaman Mahaveer Open University, Kota; for which, he is currently working as Consultant for Culture and Tourism (December 2006).

WLRA conferred its distinction of Honorary Life Membership on Dr. Modi on the occasion of its Annual Meeting held in Minneapolis, USA (October 1994) and also assigned him the responsibility of organising the 3rd WLRA World Congress in Jaipur (1993) as Organising Secretary.

He is the only faculty member from the Department of Sociology, University of Rajasthan, who has attended all the previous four WLRA World Congresses held respectively in Sydney, Australia (1991), Jaipur, India (1993), Cardiff, Wales, UK (1996), and São Paulo, Brazil (1998) and was also invited to chair the sessions.

Similarly, the [International Institute for Peace through Tourism (IIPT)] invited him to participate at its IInd and the IIIrd Global Conferences held respectively in Montreal, Canada (1994) and Glasgow. Scotland, UK (1999) and to moderate/coordinate/facilitate and chair the various sessions.

Delivered the keynote address on: “Cultural Implications of Tourism in the 21st Century” at the International Recreational Management Conference held at the Hong Kong Baptist University in December 1995.

Modi is being regularly invited as a visiting faculty member for the last several years at [WLRA International Center of Excellence (WICE)], previously at Leeuwarden and presently at Wageningen Agricultural University, Wageningen, The Netherlands and has nominated him as its country representative ever since its inception (1992), one of the most important centres for Leisure, Tourism and Environment Studies in the world.

He is not only an elected member of international associations and organisations but was also a Managing committee member of the [Indian Sociological Society] (1995–2001) and continues to be the convenor of its Research Committee on Leisure and Tourism ever since its inception. He has been an executive committee member of the [Rajasthan HRD Network Forum] (2003–2005).

He recently collaborated in a UNESCO sponsored project on "Theatre across Cultures: Encounters along the Silk Road” along with scholars from Switzerland, France and Taiwan.

Modi has been founder director of the Centre for Leisure & Tourism Studies, University of Rajasthan, Jaipur at the time of his retirement (December 2002).

Visiting professor at the [Indian Institute of Health Management Research (IIHRM)], Jaipur (2006).

Elected president of the [Rajasthan Sociological Association] (2005–08)

Elected vice-president of the Rajasthan HRD Network Forum.

This apart, Modi was the only faculty member of the Department of Sociology of the University of Rajasthan who was elected on an important executive position of a research committee of the [International Sociological Association (ISA)].

After his retirement, Modi is working on his long-cherished dream of establishing an India International Institute of Social Sciences (IIISS), an academic institution of international standards at Jaipur with the state-of-art facilities including foreign faculty collaboration.

== Bibliography ==
Some of his major publications, other than the many book chapters and papers on the themes of his special interest mentioned above, include:

1. Leisure, Mass Media and Social Structure (1985)
2. Emerging Trends in Indian Sociology (1986)
3. Drugs: Addiction and Prevention (1997)
4. Human Values and Social Change (2000)
5. Aging and Human Development (2001)

A major publication project is under progress (24 volumes on his favourite themes).
