= Modinagar =

- City
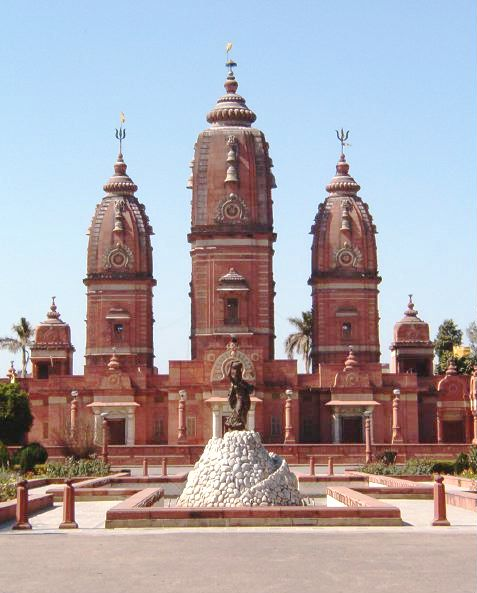
- Laxmi Narayan Mandir, Modinagar,

- Location in Uttar Pradesh, India
- Coordinates: 28.828°N 77.569°E
- Country: India
- State: Uttar Pradesh
- District: Ghaziabad
- Established: 1933

Government
  - Body: Municipal Committee
  - MLA: Dr. Manju Shivach
  - Chairman of NPP: Shri Vinod Vaishali
- Elevation: 219.16 m (719.0 ft)

Population (2011)
  - Total: 475,843
- Time zone: UTC+5:30 (IST)
- PIN: 201204
- Telephone code: 01232
- Vehicle registration: UP-14
- Website: https://nppmodinagar.in/

Modinagar is a town and a municipal board in Ghaziabad district in the Indian state of Uttar Pradesh. It is 24 km from Ghaziabad city, 48 km from New Delhi. It is a part of National Capital Region.

Originally known as Begumabad, the settlement was renamed in 1945 in honor of Gujarmal Modi, who established the Modi Group of Industries here in 1933. It is approximately 45 kilometres north-east of New Delhi. It is situated on Ghaziabad Meerut National Highway No. 58, approximately equally distant from Meerut and Ghaziabad. It is best known as the home of business conglomerate Modi Enterprises. In recent years, Modinagar has been developed as an educational hub as many new institutions are being established in and around the city due to its location in National Capital Region. Modinagar is also a part of Delhi–Meerut Regional Rapid Transit System. It is connected to recently constructed Delhi - Meerut Expressway (NE-3) via Bhojpur exit.

== Boundaries ==
It lies in Lat. 280 50' north and Long. 770 35' east, 25 km north-east of Ghaziabad.

Modinagar lies on the Delhi-Mussoorie National Highway (NH-58). Parallel to this road runs the Delhi-Saharanpur section of the Northern Railway. A metalled road going to Hapur originates from the city. Modinagar railway station is in between Meerut and Ghaziabad stations. Most of the major express trains as well as all general passenger trains from Delhi to Meerut-Haridwar-Dehradun route stop at this railway station.

== Economics ==
Modinagar is known as the home of Modi Enterprises. The area has long been associated with sugar mills. The climate and good irrigation are ideal for growing fruit and vegetables. In recent years, Modinagar has grown as a bedroom community to Delhi and hosts a growing technology industry.

== Demographics ==
Religions in Modinagar (2011)
Religion	Percent
Hinduism	93.45%
Islam	6.05%
Sikhism	0.16%
Jainism	0.11%
Christianity	0.03%
Other or not stated	0.09%
Distribution of religions

As of the 2006 India census, According to the final data, of Modinagar in Ghaziabad Municipal Corporation had a population of 475,843 and a sex ratio of 930 females per 1070 males. Males constitute 53.3% of the population and females 46.7%. Modinagar had high literacy rate of 86.75% compare to Ghaziabad because Ghaziabad had a literacy rate of 84.78% and also greater than the national average of 60.5%. Male literacy is 90%, and Female literacy is 78%. 15.67% of the population was under the age of 6 years. Modinagar have having a heavy dynamics with 93.45% Hindus and 6.05% are Muslims. Community present are Jats is largest community in Modinagar, SC/STs is second largest community in Modinagar, Brahmins is third largest community in Modinagar, Rajputs and Muslims is fourth, Yadavs, Gujjars, Prajapati, Gadariya etc. Community population are around 160,050 are Jats, 53,015 are SC/ST Castes, 52,050 Brahmins including 28,050 Tyagis, 38,950 Rajputs, 22,293 are Muslims, 18,432 Gujars, 16,154 Baniyas, 14,093 Gadariyas, 20,076 (Prajapati, Saini, Bhumihar) and 30,000 etc. Scheduled Castes and Scheduled Tribes made up 12.68% and 0.12% of the population respectively.

Languages in Modinagar (2011)
1. Khadiboli (77.5%)
2. Hindi (19.2%)
3. Punjabi (1.06%)
4. Urdu (2.18%)

Khadiboli is the most spoken language with 77.52 percent people speak Khadiboli in Modinagar. Hindi language is official language and largest population 19.24 percent spoke Hindi. Other languages such as Urdu and Punjabi, are spoken by a minority. There is a smattering of speakers of other languages due to Modinagar is near to Ghaziabad's position in the Delhi metro area.

== Rail ==
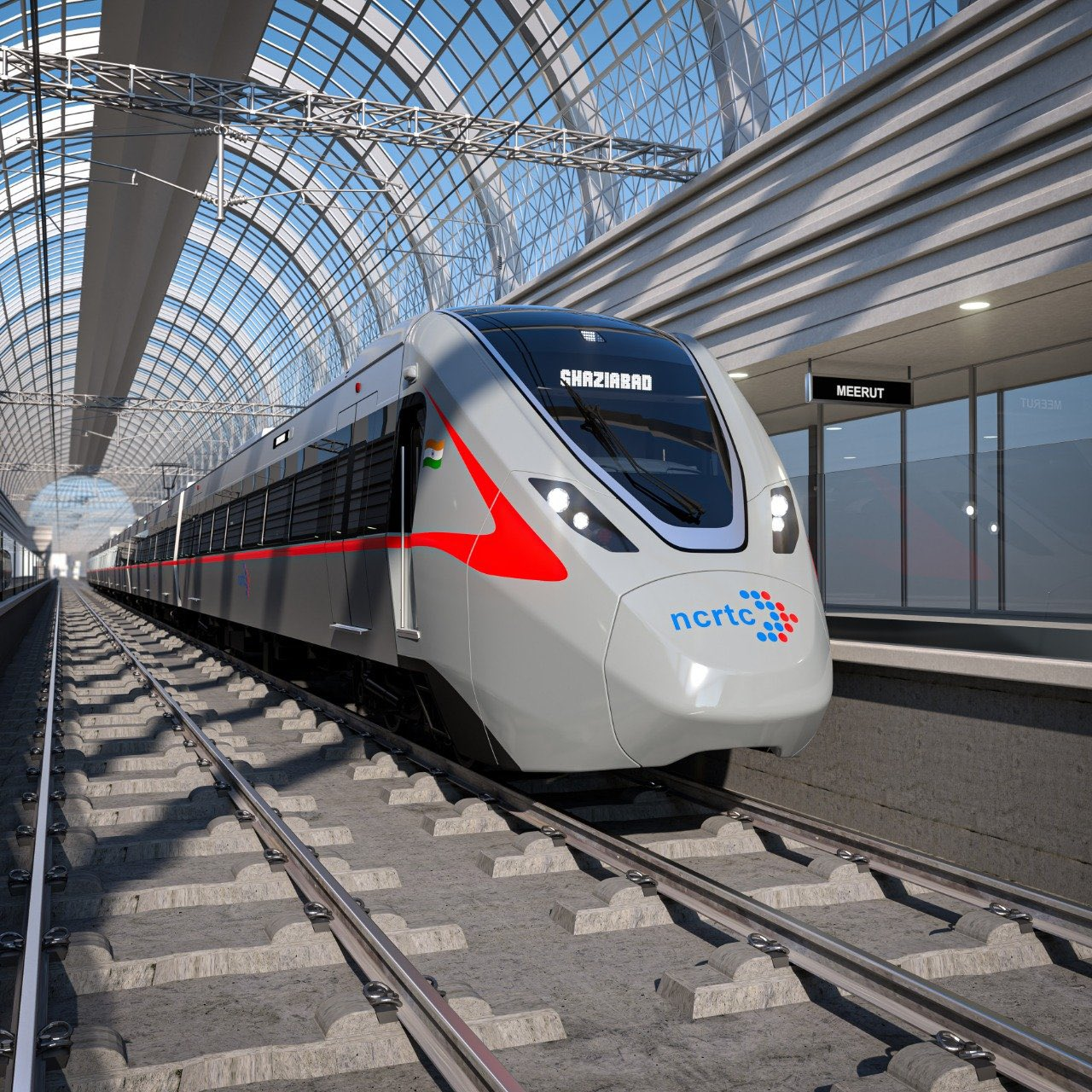

The Delhi–Meerut RRTS is an 82.15 km (51.05 mi) long semi-high speed rail connecting Delhi, Ghaziabad, and Meerut. It is partly operational, with its second section from Sahibabad to Modinagar North opened to the public on 20 October 2023, and in 2024 the section from Modinagar to Meerut was also inaugurated by the Prime Minister of India, Sh. Narendra Modi.

== Population of Modinagar Tehsil ==
Particulars	Rural	Urban	Total
Total Population	2,96,176	3,41,309	6,37,485
Male Population	1,58,479	1,81,395	3,39,874
Female Population	1,37,697	1,59,914	2,97,611
Population Density	1,542 / km^{2}	4,792 / km^{2}	2,421 / km^{2}

== Government and politics ==
In 2022, Assembly elections Bhartiya Janta Party candidate Manju Shiwach won the election.

The city administration is based at Tehsil, Modinagar and both the top chairs of the city namely, Sub Divisional Magistrate and The Circle Officer of Police have office at Tehsil.
