= Gujarmal Modi =

Indian industrialist and philanthropist

- Born: 9 August 1902; Mahendragarh, Patiala State, British India
- Died: 22 January 1976 (aged 73); Modinagar, Uttar Pradesh, India
- Occupation: Industrialist Philanthropist
- Spouse: Rajwan Modi (m. 1914) Dayawati Modi (m. 1932)
- Children: 22, including Krishan and Bhupendra (Note: Eleven of his children with his first wife were stillborn.)

Gujarmal Modi (9 August 1902 – 22 January 1976) was an Indian industrialist and philanthropist who co-established the Modi Group of companies and the industrial city of Modinagar in 1933, along with his brother Kedar Nath Modi. A sugar mill in Modinagar marked the beginning of the Modi Group conglomerate, which later diversified into varied fields.

GM Modi established schools and colleges at his birthplace, Mahendragarh, in Patiala and in Modinagar. He also contributed in the field of higher education by giving grants to established institutions such as Banaras Hindu University, and different colleges in Meerut and other places. He was awarded the Padma Bhushan by the Government of India in 1968. He is the grandfather of Lalit Modi, the founder of the Indian Premier League (IPL).

== Early life ==
Gujarmal Modi was born as Ram Prasad Modi on 9 August 1902, in Mahendragarh (now in Haryana state) to a Marwari family. He was the second child of his father, Multani Mal Modi, and the only child of his mother, Chandi Devi, who was Multani Mal's second wife. Chandi Devi died of sepsis only six days after the birth of Gujarmal. Multani Mal then married a third time, and it was his step-mother, Gujri Devi, who reared Gujarmal. All his life, Gujarmal was to share a relationship of great affection and attachment with his step-mother. He gave up his real name (Ram Prasad) in favour of the name "Gujarmal," which he selected in honour of his step-mother.

During his time studying in the tenth standard, Gujarmal neglected to pay his examination fees, which resulted in the loss of an academic year. This incident led to his father inducting Gujarmal into the family business at a young age while simultaneously being home-schooled.

== Business career ==
In 1932, after a decade during which he grappled with personal issues and depression, Modi revived both his spirit and his business. After his second marriage that year, Modi became enthused and motivated for carrying on his business, because the sense of futility and depression left him when his wife became pregnant. Modi fulfilled his long-standing desire of expanding the family business to new sectors and territories. In 1932, with an amount of Rs. 400/-, he left for Delhi on the lookout for viable ventures. The village of Begumabad was finally selected as the site of his first independent venture— a sugar mill. After initial difficulties in managing the sugar mill, Gujarmal successfully managed to turn things around to make his debut venture into a profitable entity. One of Gujarmal’s major successes was the toilet soap factory, which began operations in 1941. Gujarmal with the help of a Bengali gentleman figured out a way to produce toilet soap without the use of tallow— the substance used to make the soap cake dry and hard. Instead, his toilet soap factory used vanaspati, from his vanaspati manufacturing unit, which proved to be a huge success.

Businesses founded by Gujarmal Modi

- 1933: Sugar mill
- 1939: Vanaspati manufacturing unit
- 1940: Washing soap factory
- 1941: Toilet soap factory
- 1941: Modi tin factory
- 1941: Modi food products
- 1944: Modi Oil Mills
- 1945: Biscuit manufacturing factory and confectionery plant
- 1947: Paints and varnish factory
- 1948: Textile mill
- 1957: Spinning mill
- 1959: Flour mill
- 1960: Distillery
- 1961: Torch factory
- 1964: Steel factory
- 1965: Thread mill
- 1965: Modipon
- 1971: Modi Rubber Ltd

== Personal life ==
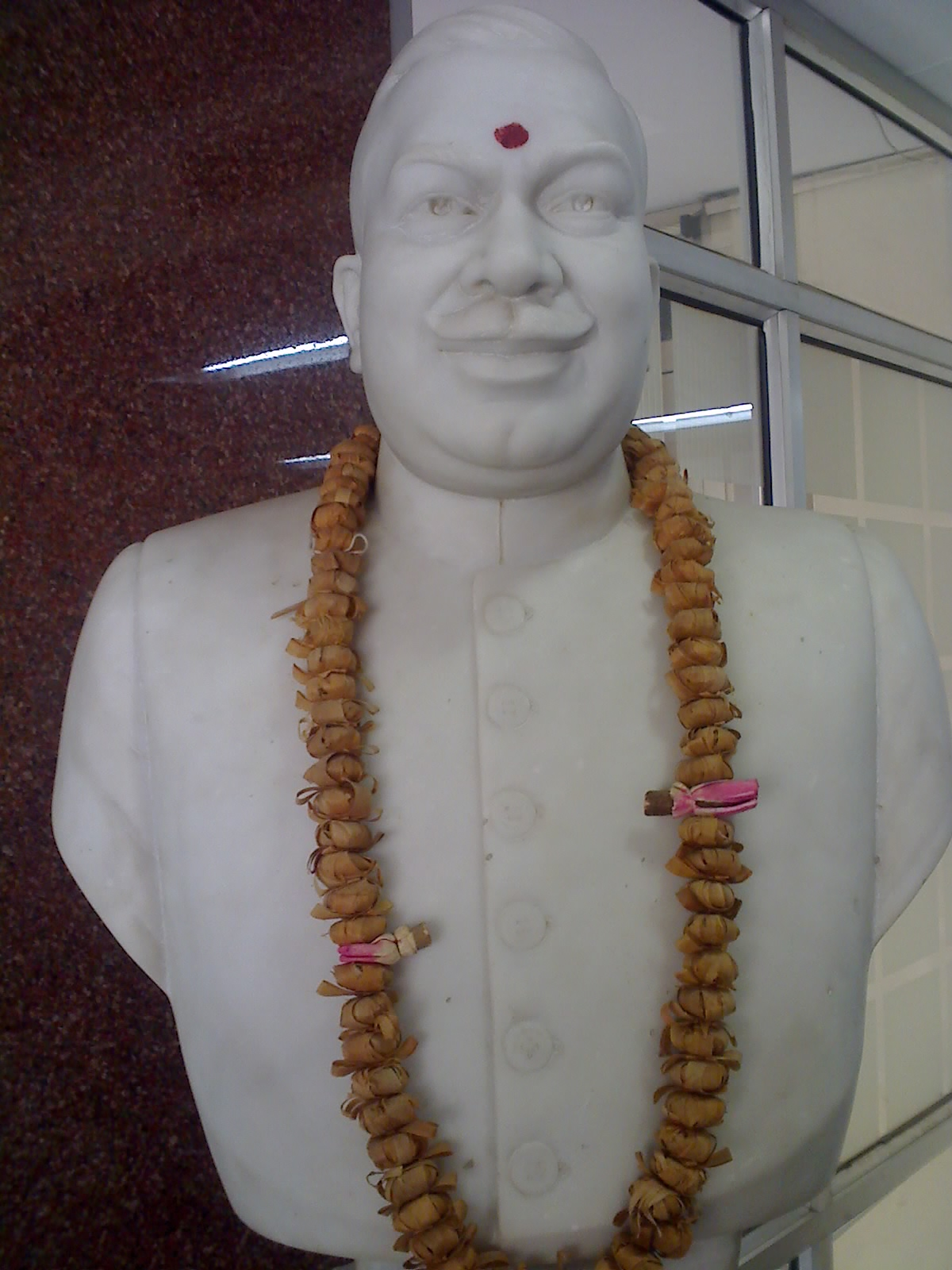
Bust of Gujarmal Modi.

Modi was married aged twelve, in 1914, to a girl the same age as him. He and his wife therefore grew up together and were very attached to each other. Six years after their wedding, the couple became the parents of a child, but the newborn died within a few hours. Little did the family realize at that time that they were fated to relive this misery ten times over, for this heartbreaking event was to be tragically repeated that many times in as many years. During the years 1920-31, Modi's wife bore as many as ten children, but every single child died either in childbirth or in infancy. Medical care in semi-rural Begumabad was abysmal, and the Modi family was not yet seriously wealthy. Modi's wife also began keeping ill constantly, but it is not known whether this was a cause or a consequence of the loss of children. It became clear that further attempt at child-bearing would be both futile and dangerous to the health of the mother. Modi's wife despaired of motherhood, and joined family elders in counselling him to bring another wife home, saying that she would rejoice in his children, for they would be in some sense her own children.

Gujar Mal finally acceded to the entreaties of his father and first wife. Multani Mal set about searching for another suitable match, and on 19 June 1932, Gujar Mal was married to Dayawati Modi, a lady of his own Marwadi community hailing from Etah district of Uttar Pradesh. Dayawati, the daughter of Chheda Lal, a tradesman of Etah, was seventeen years old; Gujar Mal was thirty. The two co-wives lived harmoniously together in the same household, because Gujar Mal began treating his first wife as a family elder. Dayawati was to become the mother of eleven healthy children, five sons and six daughters. Three daughters Rajkumari, Bimla and Rajeshwari were born before the birth of K K Modi, their eldest son, in 1940. Their other sons are Vinay Kumar, Satish Kumar, Bhupendra Kumar aka Dr.M and Umesh Kumar.

== Personality ==
Gujarmal was a staunch patriot and this was amply visible during his youth. In 1926, he was insulted on the basis of his nationality by an Englishman working in India by the name of Mr. Turner, after the young Modi outbid him during a public auction. An incensed Modi subjected the Englishman to a beating, which later resulted in a telling off by the Maharaja of Patiala; but earned him the respect of the public.

In 1945, after the end of the Second World War, the British government wanted to confer a knighthood on Gujarmal for the exemplary service provided by his companies during the War. Gujarmal instead requested the British to confer on him an Indian title. The British duly complied and decided to honour him with the title of Raja Bahadur, which was the catalyst behind the renaming of Begumabad to Modinagar. In 1946, the interim government of India decided to stop conferring titles and the decision to honour Gujarmal was deferred.

== Modi Group ==
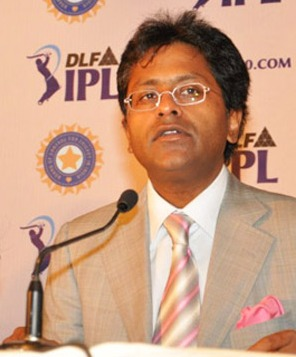
Lalit Modi.

The Modi Group split in 1989, and the business was divided between the five sons of Gujarmal Modi, including Krishan Kumar Modi, VK Modi, SK Modi, B. K. Modi and UK Modi and the three sons of his step brother Kedar Nath Modi. Krishan Kumar Modi, Gujarmal Modi's eldest son, owns Godfrey Phillips, the tobacco manufacturing company.

His brother K. N. Modi, died in 2005, at the age of 84. His son M.K. Modi is the head of Modipon Fibre, of the K.N. Modi Group, while his other son Y.K. Modi was FICCI president for many years. Since the division, the Modi Group companies have underperformed and failed to match the successes achieved by the late Gujarmal Modi.

His son Krishan Kumar Modi and former chairman of Modi Group died at the age of 79 on 2 November 2019.

In April 2010, Krishan Kumar Modi, had revealed that his eldest son Lalit Modi will succeed him as the helm of Modi Group's flagship business Godfrey Phillips India (GPI).

== Awards and honours ==
Modi had a telling impact on Indian commerce and industry and that is amply displayed by the awards and honours bestowed upon him. In 1968, he was decorated with the Padma Bhushan— the third-highest civilian award in India. The same year, he also became the President of the Federation of Indian Chambers of Commerce and Industry (FICCI). Gujarmal held positions in various committees and business-governance bodies during his career.

- 1960: Member of the Central Customs and Excise Advisory Committee
- 1960: Vice-President of the Reserve Bank of Northern India
- 1964: Member of the National Productivity Council
- 1967: Member of the Export and Import Advisory Council & Indian Exports Organisation
- 1968: Chairman of the International Arbitration Council

== Philanthropic activities ==
GM Modi established various institutions in the fields of education, science, medicine and women’s welfare to uplift the country’s downtrodden and encourage competence-development in the youth. The Gujarmal Modi Innovative Science and Technology Award was instituted in 1988 in honour of his numerous philanthropic contributions to the field.

Educational Institutes under the Modi Group

- Multani Mal Modi Post-Graduate College, Modinagar
- Multani Mal Modi Degree College, Patiala
- Modi Science & Commerce College, Modinagar
- Rukmani Modi Mahila Maha Vidyalaya, Modinagar
- Dayawati Modi Public School, Modinagar
- Dayawati Modi High School, G.M. Modigram, Kathwara, Rai Barelli
- Dayawati Modi Junior High School, Sikrikalan
- Dayawati Modi Junior High School, Devendrapuri, Modinagar
- Gayatri Devi Modi Junior High School, Kedarpura, Modinagar
- Chandidevi Modi Junior High School, Modipuram
- Dayawati Modi Junior High School, Saidpur
- Dayawati Modi Junior High School, Abupur
- Dayawati Modi Junior High School, Bhojpur
- Pramila Devi Modi Junior High School, Harmukhpuri, Modinagar
- Dayawati Modi Junior High School, Shahjahanpur
- Condensed Course of Education for Adult Women, Modinagar
- Chheda Lal Shishu Niketan, Kasganj, Etah
- Chandidevi Modi Primary School, Modipuram
- Chandidevi Modi Nursery School, Modipuram
- Dayawati Modi Mahila Shilpa Kala Kendra, Modinagar
- Dayawati Modi Mahila Shilpa Kala Kendra, Modipuram
- Dayawati Modi Mahila Shilpa Kala Kendra, Kedarpura, Modinagar
- Dayawati Modi Mahila Shilpa Kala Kendra, Sikrikalan
- Dayawati Modi Mahila Shilpa Kala Kendra, Abupur
- Dayawati Modi Mahila Shilpa Kala Kendra, G.M. Modigram, Kathwara, Rai Barelli
- Multani Mal Modi Vidyalaya, Mahendergarh, Haryana

== Sources ==
- Herdeck, Margaret; Piramal, Gita (1985). India's industrialists, Volume 1 India's Industrialists. Lynne Rienner. ISBN 0-89410-415-2.
- Saxena, Aruna (1989). Perspectives in industrial geography: a case study of an industrial city of Uttar Pradesh. Concept Publishing Company. ISBN 81-7022-250-8.
- Chauhan, Dr. P.P.S. (1977). A Vision of Karmayogi Gujarmal Modi. Modinagar: Allied Publicity Bureau. pp. 10–14.
