= Jakheda Rahmatpur =

Village in Uttar Pradesh

- Village
- Location in Uttar Pradesh, India
- Coordinates: 28.6926°N 78.0483°E
- Country: India
- State: Uttar Pradesh
- District: Hapur
- Tehsil: Garhmukteshwar

Government
  - Type: Gram Panchayat

Area
  - Total: 4.22 km^{2} (1.63 sq mi)
- Elevation: 213 m (699 ft)

Population (2011)
  - Total: 3,907
  - Density: 926/km^{2} (2,400/sq mi)
- Time zone: UTC+5:30 (IST)
- PIN: 245205
- Vehicle registration: UP37

Jakheda Rahmatpur (Hindi: जखेड़ा रहमतपुर) is a village and Gram Panchayat in the Garhmukteshwar tehsil of Ghaziabad district, Uttar Pradesh, India. Some sources also place it under Hapur district after the district reorganisation in 2011.

== Geography ==
The village covers a total area of 4.22 km² (421.68 hectares), and lies at an elevation of approximately 213 m above sea level.

Its geographical coordinates are 28.6926° N, 78.0483° E.

== Demographics ==
According to the 2011 Census of India:

- Population: 3,907 (Males: 2,074; Females: 1,833) - Children (ages 0–6): 578 (14.8%) - Sex ratio: 884 females per 1,000 males - Scheduled Castes: 918; Scheduled Tribes: 0 - Households: 668

=== Literacy ===
- Overall literacy: 62.63% - Male literacy: 73.90% - Female literacy: 49.84%

=== Workforce ===
- Total workers: 1,346 (main workers: 1,148; marginal workers: 198) - Cultivators: 329; Agricultural labourers: 408

== Administration ==
Jakheda Rahmatpur is administered via its own Gram Panchayat under the Simbhawali block, and falls under the Garhmukteshwar Vidhan Sabha constituency.

== Transport ==
The village is connected by local roads; nearest major railway station is over 10 km away (including the two stations in Garhmukteshwar).

== Postal Services ==
The post office at Jakheda Rahmatpur serves the village under PIN code 245205.

== See also ==
- Hapur district
- Ghaziabad district, Uttar Pradesh
- Garhmukteshwar
