= Pilkhuwa =

Town in Uttar Pradesh, India

- Town
- Location in Uttar Pradesh, India Pilkhuwa (India)
- Coordinates: 28.711969°N 77.654457°E
- Country: India
- State: Uttar Pradesh
- District: Hapur

Government
  - Type: Municipal Council
  - Body: Pilkhuwa Municipal Council
  - Municipal Chairperson: Vibhu Bansal (BJP)

Population (2011)
  - Total: 83,736

Language
  - Official: Hindi
  - Additional official: Urdu
- Time zone: UTC+5:30 (IST)
- PIN: 245304
- Vehicle registration: UP-37

Pilkhuwa is a town and a municipal board in Hapur district in the Indian state of Uttar Pradesh. It is located 12 km from Hapur, the district headquarters. Situated in western Uttar Pradesh, historically known for its textile manufacturing, handloom weaving, This town is surrounded by numerous historical villages and agriculture settlements.

It is located on National Highway-9, which connects the National Capital Territory of Delhi to Lucknow, the capital city of Uttar Pradesh in India.

== Name ==
According to Paul Whalley, the name Pilkhuwā comes from the name of the pilkhan tree, from a variant form pilkhu.

== History ==
In the 12th century, Delhi was ruled by the Rajput King Raja Anangpal Singh Tomar. The etymology of Pilkhuwa lies in the story of an elephant named "Pil", that disappeared from Delhi state, after which the king sent his son to find it. When the search team made a stop at the village of Pilkhuwa, people gathered around them and began saying "Pil-Khuwa", meaning "Pil is lost".

In 1235, Pilkhuwa was established by the Tomar Kings under the Tomar Dynasty. However, in the 14th century, when the Tomar Kings were defeated by the Delhi Sultanate, the Rajput population of Pilkhuwa was affected and their rule came to an end. Pilkhuwa was part of Meerut district until 1976, when on the anniversary of Jawaharlal Nehru's birth, the then-chief minister N. D. Tiwari declared Ghaziabad as a new district. Later on, Ghaziabad was divided into two districts: Ghaziabad and Panchsheel Nagar by Bahujan Samaj Party chief minister Mayawati on 28 September 2011, and Pilkhuwa became part of Panchsheel Nagar. At the time, Panchsheel Nagar was the newly-given name to the city of Hapur by Mayawati; local people were unhappy about the name change, however. Due to political clashes between the Samajwadi Party and Bahujan Samaj Party, the subsequent chief minister Akhilesh Yadav changed the district name to Hapur on 23 July 2012, retaining the original name. Finally, Pilkhuwa became part of Hapur district.

== Demographics ==
According to Official voter data published by the Election Commission of India,has provided community-wise estimates for the Ghaziabad Lok Sabha constituency.

Ghaziabad Lok Sabha constituency has a diverse caste composition with Rajputs considered the most dominant community in the district. The constituency is estimated to have nearly 600,000 to 7 lakh Rajput voters, around 550,000 Muslims, 450,000 Brahmins, 450,000 Scheduled Caste voters, 250,000 Banias, 125,000 Jats, 100,000 Punjabis, 75,000 Tyagis and 70,000 Gujjars.

The district has more than 150 Tomar (Tanwar) Rajput villages and over 84 Gehlot Rajput villages. The historic Satha-Chaurasi region also falls within the district, taking the total number of Rajput-dominated villages to over 250 across Ghaziabad district. Several prominent Rajput leaders have represented the constituency, including Rajnath Singh, who was elected twice as Member of Parliament from Ghaziabad, General V. K. Singh, who also served two terms as MP, and Dr. Ramesh Chandra Singh Tomar, who represented the constituency five times in the Lok Sabha. Former MLA Sukhbir Singh Gehlot was also a notable Rajput leader from the region, reflecting the political influence of the Rajput community in Ghaziabad district.

As of the 2011 Indian Census, Pilkhuwa had a total population of 83,736, of which 44,226 were males and 39,510 were females. The population within the 0-6 age group was 12,468. The total number of literates in Pilkhuwa was 55,936, which constituted 66.8% of the population. Male literacy was 73.3% and female literacy was 59.5%. The effective literacy rate of the 7+ population of Pilkhuwa was 78.5%, of which male literacy rate was 86.5% and female literacy rate was 69.6%. The Scheduled Castes population was 14,370. Pilkhuwa had 13,746 households in 2011.

== Economy ==
Pilkhuwa is notable for its handloom cotton textiles and exotic printing on khadi and handloom fabrics. There were 120 medium scale industries, 1400 power looms and 3 niwar factories in Pilkhuwa in 1991. 7000 persons employed in textile production, 2000 in cloth sheet washing, 500 in pressing machines, 500 in dyeing, 100 in kundis and 200 in stamping and design. Most of the handloom cloths manufactured in Pilkhuwa is supplied to Meerut apart from centres in other parts of India and abroad.

== Educational institutes ==
- Raj Kumar Goel Engineering College
- Saraswati Medical College

== Notable people ==
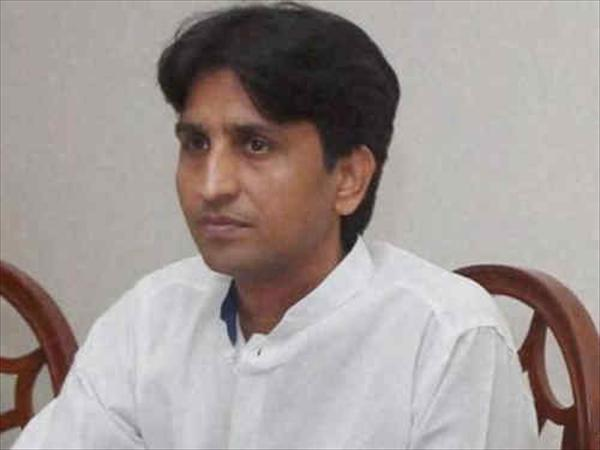
Kumar Vishwas

- Kumar Vishwas
- Manish Sisodia
