= Hasanpur Lodha =

- Village
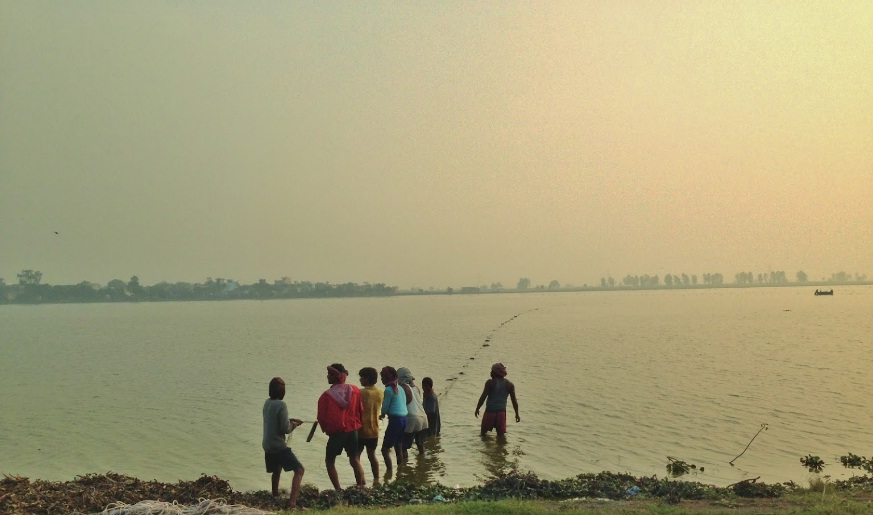
- Fishermen by Lake Hasanpur
- Interactive map of Hasanpur Lodha
- Country: India
- State: Uttar Pradesh

Government
  - Body: Gram panchayat

Population
  - Total: 3,464

Languages
  - Official: Hindi
- Postal code: 201015

Hasanpur Lodha is a village located in Dhaulana Tehsil, Hapur District, Uttar Pradesh, India. It is located 17 km east of the district headquarters, Ghaziabad, and 453 km from state capital Lucknow.

The village is 519.55 hectares in size and most of the land is privately owned. The majority of its 3,464 inhabitants are either Jats or Brahmins, speaking Hindi and Urdu. Its main attractions are a lake and a temple located at Shiv Nagri.
