= Bhatail =

- Village
- Location in Uttar Pradesh, India Bhatail (India)
- Country: India
- State: Uttar Pradesh
- District: Ghaziabad
- Tehsil: Hapur
- Elevation: 201 m (659 ft)

Population (2011)
  - Total: 1,444

Languages
  - Official: Hindi
- Time zone: UTC+5:30 (IST)

Bhatail is a village in Hapur Tehsil in Ghaziabad District of Uttar Pradesh State, India. As of the 2011 census, the village had a population of 1,444, of whom 762 were male and 683 were female. The village has a literacy rate of 73.22%; 85.21% for men and 59.66% for women, higher than the national average of 64.8%.

== Geography ==
The village is located only 50 km (31 miles) away from Delhi, the largest city in India and the second largest in the world. It is also located 25 km (21.6 miles) from the Ganges river. The village is 201 metres above sea level.
