= Amrala =

Amrala Amrala
- Village
- Location within Uttar Pradesh Location within India
- Coordinates: 28.782270°N 77.610816°E
- Country: India
- State: Uttar Pradesh
- District: Ghaziabad
- city: Modinagar
- Founder: vishvender singh
- Seat: modinagar

Government
- 5,000
- Time zone: GMT+5:30
- Postal code: 245304
- Area code: 1232

Amrala is a village in Modinagar under the Ghaziabad district in Uttar Pradesh, India. It is situated near Faridnagar, Bhojpur in Amrala about 7 kilometres (4.3 mi) away from Modinagar (NH 58). The main business of the village is agriculture.
