= Town Agota, District Bulandshahr =

Coordinates: 28.5414139°N 77.8624104°E

Agauta or Agota is a town and a Gram panchayat in Bulandshahr district in the state of Uttar Pradesh, India. This town is 300 years old and was once a Rajya Sabha Seat.

It belongs to Meerut Division. It is located 18 km towards north from district headquarters Bulandshahr. 11 km from Gulaothi. 416 km from state capital Lucknow. Agauta is famous for the Agauta Sugar & Chemicals.

Agota's PIN code is 245411, and its postal head office is located in Gulaothi (Bulandshahr). Agota is known for its calm and peaceful environment, making it a comfortable place to live. The town is welcoming to newcomers, including those interested in investing in land or establishing factories. Residents are supportive of one another, contributing to a strong sense of community. Agota is generally regarded as a safe area with very low reported crime.

Kisoli (2 km), Nimchana (2 km), Pavsara (3 km), Bubupur (3 km), Bagwala (3 km) are the nearby villages to Agota. Agota is surrounded by Gulaothi Tehsil towards the west, Bhawan Bahadur Nagar towards the north, Bulandshahr Tehsil towards the south, and Syana Tehsil towards the east.
