= Khorajpur =

Coordinates: 28.8191°N 77.4354°E

Khorajpur is a village located in the Ghaziabad district of Uttar Pradesh state in India.
