= Faridnagar =

- Town
- Location in Uttar Pradesh, India
- Coordinates: 28.77°N 77.62°E
- Country: India
- State: Uttar Pradesh
- District: Ghaziabad
- Elevation: 212 m (696 ft)

Population (2001)
  - Total: 11,271

Languages
  - Official: Hindi
- Time zone: UTC+5:30 (IST)

Faridnagar is a town and a nagar panchayat in Ghaziabad district in the state of Uttar Pradesh, India.

== Geography ==
Faridnagar is located at 28.77°N 77.62°E. It has an average elevation of 212 metres (695 feet).

== History ==
Faridnagar was founded during the rule of the great mogul emperor Akbar by Nawab Farid-ud-din. He was awarded the "Zagir" of seventeen villages between Pilkhua and Begmabad by emperor Akbar the great. The town used to be a garrison for a small mugal military unit and housed the Taksal - a place to mint mugal coins during the reigns of Akbar and Jahangir. The major source of revenue were farming, gardening and trade. Important industries were cotton weaving and Khandsari-the gud making, oil extraction and pottery making.

The decline of the town started in the early 1930s when the British constructed highways and built rail roads. All of them bypassed Faridnagar and Modinagar became the major industrial and educational center. Cotton industries shifted to Pilkhuwa.

== Demographics ==
As of 2001 India census, Faridnagar had a population of 11,271. Males constitute 53% of the population and females 47%. Faridnagar has an average literacy rate of 43%, lower than the national average of 59.5%: male literacy is 53%, and female literacy is 32%. In Faridnagar, 19% of the population is under 6 years of age. The population is mixed, almost equally divided between Hindus and Muslims. Most of the Hindu population live on Pilkhua side while Muslims live on Hapur side. A high percentage of Muslims went to Pakistan after partition of the country in 1947. The decline of town started in the early nineteen hundreds when the railway lines were laid and roads were paved. The town was bypassed by only few miles. Other town grew particularly Pilkhuwa and Modinagar at the expense of Faridnagar. The sugar mill in Modinagar caused the death of local "Gud" making. Later on failure of electric supply killed the weaving industry too. The weaver community fled en masse to nearby cities.
