= Muradnagar railway station =

Railway station in Uttar Pradesh, India

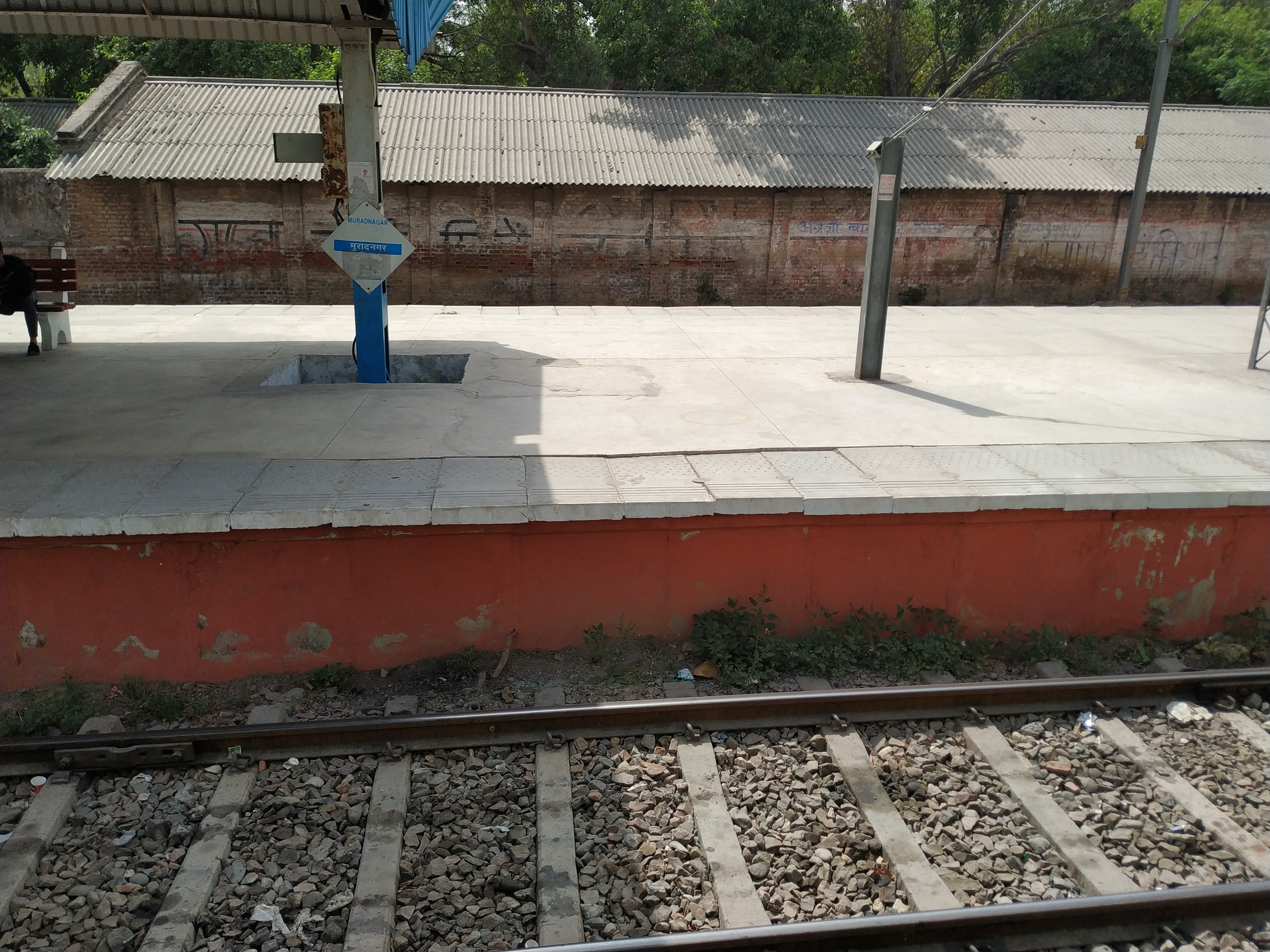
- Muradnagar railway station.

General information
- Location: Muradnagar, Uttar Pradesh; India
- Coordinates: 28.75971°N 77.507484°E
- Elevation: 221 metres (725 ft)
- System: Indian Railways station Passenger station
- Owner: Indian Railways
- Operator: Northern Railway
- Platforms: 2
- Connections: Auto stand

Construction
- Structure type: Standard (on-ground station)

Other information
- Status: Functioning
- Station code: MUD
- Zone(s): Northern Railway
- Division(s): Delhi

Services
| Preceding station | Indian Railways | Following station |
|---|---|---|
| Duhai Halt towards ? | Delhi–Meerut–Saharanpur line | Modinagar towards ? |
Route map
Location
- Location within Uttar Pradesh

Muradnagar railway station (code: MUD) is a railway station in Ghaziabad district, Uttar Pradesh. It serves Muradnagar city. The station has two platforms. The platforms are not well sheltered.

Muradnagar station is on the Meerut City-Ghaziabad line. Express trains do not halt at this station. Only local passenger trains halt in Muradnagar Railway Station.
