= Jalalpur Didhar =

Village in Uttar Pradesh, India

Jalalpur Dhindar Dhindar
- Village
- Jalalpur Dhindar
- Location within Uttar Pradesh Location within India
- Coordinates: 28.83084°N 77.43535°E
- Country: India
- State: Uttar Pradesh
- District: Gaziabad

Population (2011)
  - Total: 4,177

Languages
  - Official: Hindi
- Time zone: UTC+5:30 (IST)
- Postal code: 201206

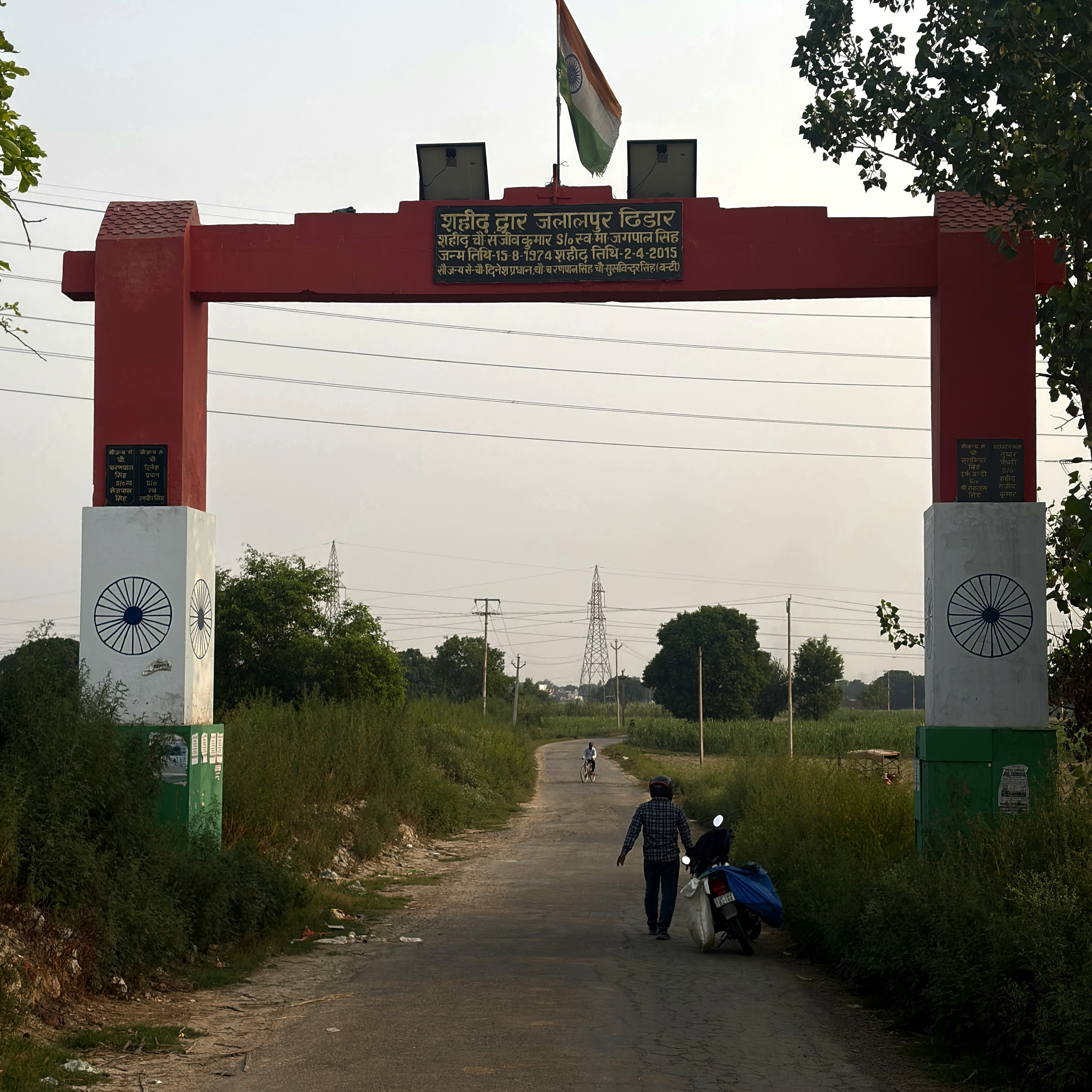
Main gate of the village

Jalalpur Dhindar also written as Jalalpur Didhar or simply Dhindar is a village located near Muradnagar town of Modinagar tehsil in Gaziabad district of Uttar Pradesh, India.

== Demographics ==
According to 2011 census, village Dhindar had a total population of 4,177 people, from which 2317 are males and 1860 are females. And children between age group 0-6 are 498. The average sex ratio of the village is 803 females per 1000 males, which is lower than the sex ratio of Uttar Pradesh state average 902 females per 1000 males.

Jalalpur Dhindar village has higher literacy rate compared to Uttar Pradesh. In 2011, literacy rate of Jalalpur Dhindar village was 83.45% compared to 69.7% of Uttar Pradesh. In Jalalpur Didhar Male literacy stands at 93.39% while female literacy rate was 71.06%.

== Notable people ==
- Saina Nehwal– Former world's no.1 badminton player, althrough born in Hisar, her ancestral village is said to be Dhindar.
- Harvir Singh Nehwal– Father of Saina Nehwal, has a PhD in agricultural science, worked at Chaudhary Charan Singh Haryana Agricultural University.

== See also ==
- Muradnagar
- Modinagar
- Gaziabad
- Baghpat
