= Rali Chauhan =

- Village
- Location in Uttar Pradesh, India Rali Chauhan (India)
- Coordinates: 28.97°N 77.77°E
- Country: India
- State: Uttar Pradesh
- Division: Meerut
- District: Meerut

Population (2011)
  - Total: 3,183

Rali Chauhan is a village in the Meerut district of Uttar Pradesh state, India. It forms a part of the National Capital Region (NCR). It is located 9 km (5.6 mi) from the district capital of Meerut, and 457 km (284 mi) from Lucknow, the state capital. Rali Chauhan's Pincode is 250002. Nearby villages include Islamabad Chhilora, Bhawanpur, Datavali Gesupur, and Ajanta Colony.

== Demographics ==
As of the 2011 Census of India.

- Male Population - 1729
- Female Population - 1454
- Children (ages 0–6) - 467
- Total Population - 3183
- Total number of houses - 548
- Language - Hindi

Compared with Uttar Pradesh as a whole, Rali Chauhan has a higher rate of literacy: 77.61% to 67.68%. The literacy among males is 86.62%, while that among women is 66.83%.

The village is led by a Sarpanch.

== Public transport links ==
Meerut City Rail Way Station and Meerut Cantt Rail Way Station are the nearest rail stations to Rali Chauhan.

== Colleges near Rali Chauhan ==
- Nav Jeevan Inter College
- Jan Hitkaari Inter College
- Bharti College
