= Raj Kumar Goel Engineering College =

Former technical institute in Pilkhuwa, Uttar Pradesh, India

- Motto: "Knowledge is Enveloped by Ignorance"
- Established: 2007
- Affiliations: Dr. A.P.J. Abdul Kalam Technical University, AICTE
- Chairman: Shri Dinesh Kumar Goel
- Director: S. K.Gaur
- Location: Pilkhuwa, India
- Campus: Suburban, 25 acres
- Nickname: RKGEC
- Website: rkgec.edu.in

Raj Kumar Goel Engineering College (RKGEC), founded in 2007, was a technical institute in the city of Pilkhuwa, Hapur district, Uttar Pradesh, India. It was recognized by the All India Council for Technical Education. It was managed by an educational trust known as the Raj Kumar Goel Educational Foundation. The college shut down in 2017.

== Academic programmes ==
RKGEC, Pilkhuwa offers undergraduate and postgraduate programmes in engineering and management. The college provides degree courses in Civil Engineering, Computer Science & Engineering, Electrical & Electronics Engineering, Electronics & Communication Engineering, Mechanical Engineering, and Information Technology.

== Facilities ==
- Library with more than 35,000 books
- Stationery shop with photocopying facility
- In-campus 24-7 Wi-Fi-enabled hostel facility
- Conveyance available for medical cases and all placement activities
- Computer centres are equipped with Core i3 3.2 GHz, 2 GB RAM systems with 40 Mbit/s fiber optic connectivity
- Cricket grounds, football field, cemented basketball court, volleyball court, cemented badminton court, table tennis tables.
