= Modinagar railway station =

Railway station in Uttar Pradesh, India

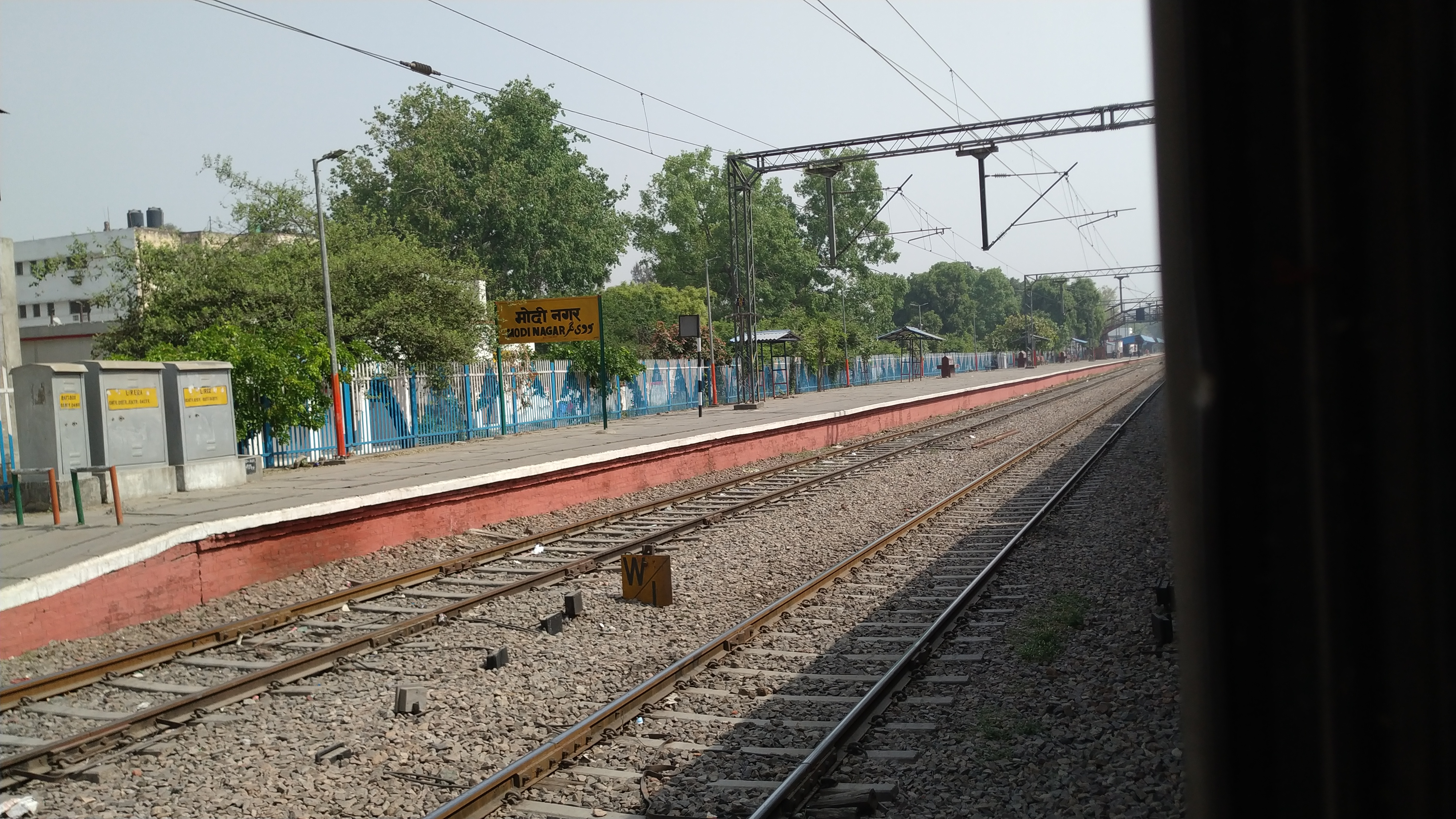
- Modinagar railway station.

General information
- Location: Modinagar, Uttar Pradesh; India
- Coordinates: 28.8285°N 77.5722°E
- Elevation: 222 metres (728 ft)
- System: Indian Railways station Passenger station
- Owner: Indian Railways
- Operator: Northern Railway
- Platforms: 2
- Tracks: 4 (double electrified BG)
- Connections: Auto stand

Construction
- Structure type: Standard (on-ground station)
- Parking: No
- Cycle facilities: No

Other information
- Status: Functioning
- Station code: MDNR
- Zone(s): Northern Railway
- Division(s): Delhi

Services
Preceding station	Indian Railways	Following station
Muradnagar towards ?	Delhi–Meerut–Saharanpur line	Mohiuddinpur towards ?
Route map
Location
- Location within Uttar Pradesh

Modinagar railway station (code: MDNR) is a main railway station in Ghaziabad district, Uttar Pradesh. It serves Modinagar city. The station consists of two platforms. The platforms are not well sheltered. It lacks many facilities including water and sanitation.

The station lies between Meerut and Ghaziabad therefore most of the major express trains as well as all general passenger trains from Delhi to Meerut–Haridwar–Dehradun route stop at this railway station. The station is part of Delhi–Meerut–Saharanpur line of the Northern Railway and comes under Delhi railway division of Northern Railway.

== Trains ==
Some of the trains that run from Modinagar are:

- Chhattisgarh Express
- Panchvalley Passenger
- Ambala–Hazrat Nizamuddin Passenger
- Indore–Dehradun Express
- Jalandhar City–New Delhi Intercity Express
- Shalimar Express
- Old Delhi–Saharanpur DEMU Passenger
- Meerut City–Anand Vihar MEMU
- Rishikesh–Old Delhi Passenger
- Saharanpur Delhi Passenger
- Meerut Cantt.–Rewari Passenger
- Delhi–Ambala Cantonment Intercity Express
- Kalka Delhi Passenger
- Yoga Express
- Meerut City–Mandsor Link Express
- Bandra Terminus–Dehradun Express
- Uttranchal Express
