= Accheja =

Coordinates: 28°43′31″N 77°44′11″E

Accheja is a village in the Gautam Budha Nagar district of Uttar Pradesh, India. It is located 4 kilometres (2.5 mi) from the city of Hapur, and is home to seven temples, including Sai Mandir. It is well connected to Delhi, Ghaziabad and Meerut.
