= Dadayra =

Village in Uttar Pradesh, India

Coordinates: 28.74651°N 77.82293°E

Dadayra is a village in Hapur tehsil in Hapur district in Uttar Pradesh.
