= Asouda =

Village in Hapur district, Uttar Pradesh, India

Coordinates: 28°45′15″N 77°46′15″E

Asouda is a village near Hapur in the Hapur district of Uttar Pradesh state of India.
