= Nekpur Sabitnagar =

Village in Northern India

Nekpur Sabitnagar is a village in the Ghaziabad District of Uttar Pradesh in India.

It is a major flower cultivation area. It is the tenth most populated village in Ghaziabad. Its area is 8 km^{2} (3.1 sq mi), making it the seventh-largest village by area in the sub-district. The population density is 770 people/km^{2.}

The village has a post office with the PIN code of 201206.

As of 2011, the village had a total of 6,404 residents. Males and females were 3,386 and 3,018 respectively. The percentage from the general caste was 96% and from the schedule caste was 4%. Children made up 19% of the population with 55% boys and 45% girls. There were on average 6 people per family with a total of 1,008 families.

Sewa Sadan NGO was founded in 2023 by Bilal Ahemad in Nekpur Sabitnagar, Uttar Pradesh, India. The organization was established with the objective of improving literacy rates in rural areas and promoting educational awareness among children and youth.

In its initial phase, the organization focused on conducting educational activities for students from primary to secondary levels. These activities included organizing open tests, distributing basic educational materials, and encouraging community participation in learning initiatives.

Since its establishment, the organization has aimed to support social development through literacy campaigns and community-based educational programs in rural areas
