= Bisokhar =

- Census town
- Location in Uttar Pradesh, India Bisokhar (India)
- Coordinates: 28°51′29″N 77°34′43″E
- Country: India
- State: Uttar Pradesh
- District: Ghaziabad

Population (2001)
  - Total: 10,476

Languages
  - Official: Hindi
- Time zone: UTC+5:30 (IST)
- Vehicle registration: UP- 14
- Website: up.gov.in

Bisokhar is a census town in Ghaziabad district in the state of Uttar Pradesh, India. Bisokhar is a village in District Ghaziabad in state of Uttar Pradesh, India. Geographically it is located on Delhi - Meerut Highway in the town of Modinagar which is an Industrial town of western UP. More than half land belonging to the village is in modinagar while other is still used as agriculture land. Modinagar railway station is 3 km away. It has an elected village panchayat. People living here belong to primarily Religion Hindu and Muslim.

== Demographics ==
As of the 2001 Census of India, Bisokhar had a population of 10,476. Males constitute 54% of the population and females 46%. Bisokhar has an average literacy rate of 58%, lower than the national average of 59.5%; with male literacy of 63% and female literacy of 43%. 17% of the population is under 6 years of age.
