= Chander Nagar =

City and municipal council in Uttar Pradesh, India

Chander Nagar is a city and municipal council in the Ghaziabad district of Uttar Pradesh, India.

== Geography ==
Chander nagar is located at 28.66°N 77.33°E and has an average elevation of 206 m above sea level.
