= Babugarh =

Babugarh Babugarh Chavani
- Town
- Location in Uttar Pradesh, India
- Coordinates: 28.72°N 77.85°E
- Country: India
- State: Uttar Pradesh
- District: Hapur
- Elevation: 200 m (660 ft)

Population (2001)
  - Total: 5,938

Languages
  - Official: Hindi
- Time zone: UTC+5:30 (IST)

Babugarh Chavani is a town and a nagar panchayat in, near Hapur city in Hapur district, in the state of Uttar Pradesh, India. Babugarh Chavani is located almost 7 km away from Hapur towards Holy Pilgrimage Garhmukteshwar after crossing toll bridge near village "Tatarpur & Simroli". The name Chavani comes from EBS (Equine Breeding Stud) of the Indian Army. People of Babugarh are rich because their land is acquired by government for construction work. According to Land rules of Government of India government give them a huge amount of compensation for Land acquisition.

== Geography ==
Babugarh Chavani is located at 28.72°N 77.85°E. It has an average elevation of 200 metres (656 feet).

== Demographics ==
As of 2001 India census, Babugarh had a population of 5938. Males constitute 53% of the population and females 47%. Babugarh has an average literacy rate of 64%, higher than the national average of 59.5%; with 61% of the males and 39% of females literate. 15% of the population is under 6 years of age.
