= Muradnagar =

- City
- Location in Uttar Pradesh, India
- Coordinates: 28.78°N 77.5°E
- Country: India
- State: Uttar Pradesh
- District: Ghaziabad

Government
  - Body: Municipal Committee
- Elevation: 215 m (705 ft)

Population (2011)
  - Total: 408,643

Languages
  - Official: Hindi, Khadiboli
- Time zone: UTC+5:30 (IST)
- Postal code: 201206
- Vehicle registration: UP-14

Muradnagar is a city and a municipal board in Ghaziabad district of Uttar Pradesh, India. It lies about 22 km (14 mi) from Ghaziabad, the district headquarters, and 55 km (34 mi) from Delhi.

Muradnagar is a part of Delhi–Meerut Regional Rapid Transit System.

== Geography ==
Muradnagar is located at 28.78°N 77.5°E.

== Boundaries ==
Muradnagar lies on the Delhi-Mussoorie National Highway (NH-58). Parallel to this road runs the Delhi-Saharanpur section of the Northern Railway. A metalled road going to Hapur originates from the city. Muradnagar railway station is in between Meerut and Ghaziabad stations. Most of the major express trains as well as all general passenger trains from Delhi to Meerut-Haridwar-Dehradun route stop at this railway station.

== Demographics ==
Religions in Muradnagar (2011)
Religion	Percent
Hinduism	91.50%
Islam	5.16%
Sikhism	0.96%
Jainism	0.91%
Christianity	0.58%
Other or not stated	0.87%
Distribution of religions

As of the 2006 India census, According to the final data, of Muradnagar in Ghaziabad Municipal Corporation had a population of 408,643 and a sex ratio of 940 females per 1060 males. Males constitute 53% of the population and females 47%. Muradnagar had high literacy rate of 90.75% compare to Ghaziabad because Ghaziabad had a literacy rate of 84.78% and also greater than the national average of 60.5%. Male literacy is 96%, and Female literacy is 85%. 15.67% of the population was under the age of 6 years. Muradnagar have having a low dynamics with 91.50% Hindus and 5.16% are Muslims. Community present are Jats is largest community in Muradnagar, Brahmins is second largest community in Muradnagar, SC/STs is third largest community in Muradnagar, Yadavs is fourth, Rajputs, Baniyas, Gujars, Muslims, Prajapati etc. community population around 138,939 Jats, 49,050 Brahmins including 34,050 Tyagis, 41,000 SC/ST Castes, 37,950 Yadavs, 21,085 Muslims, 20,432 Rajputs, 16,754 Baniyas, 13,893 Gujars, 13,076 (Prajapati, saini, bhumihar) etc. Scheduled Castes and Scheduled Tribes made up 10.68% and 0.12% of the population respectively.

Languages in Muradnagar (2011)
1. Khadiboli (65.5%)
2. Hindi (30.2%)
3. Punjabi (1.08%)
4. Urdu (1.06%)
5. other (2.10%)

Khadiboli is the most spoken language with 65.52 percent people speak Khadiboli in Muradnagar. Hindi language is official language and largest population 30.24 percent spoke Hindi. Other languages such as Urdu and Punjabi, are spoken by a minority. There is a smattering of speakers of other languages due to Muradnagar is near to Ghaziabad's position in the Delhi metro area.

== Rail ==
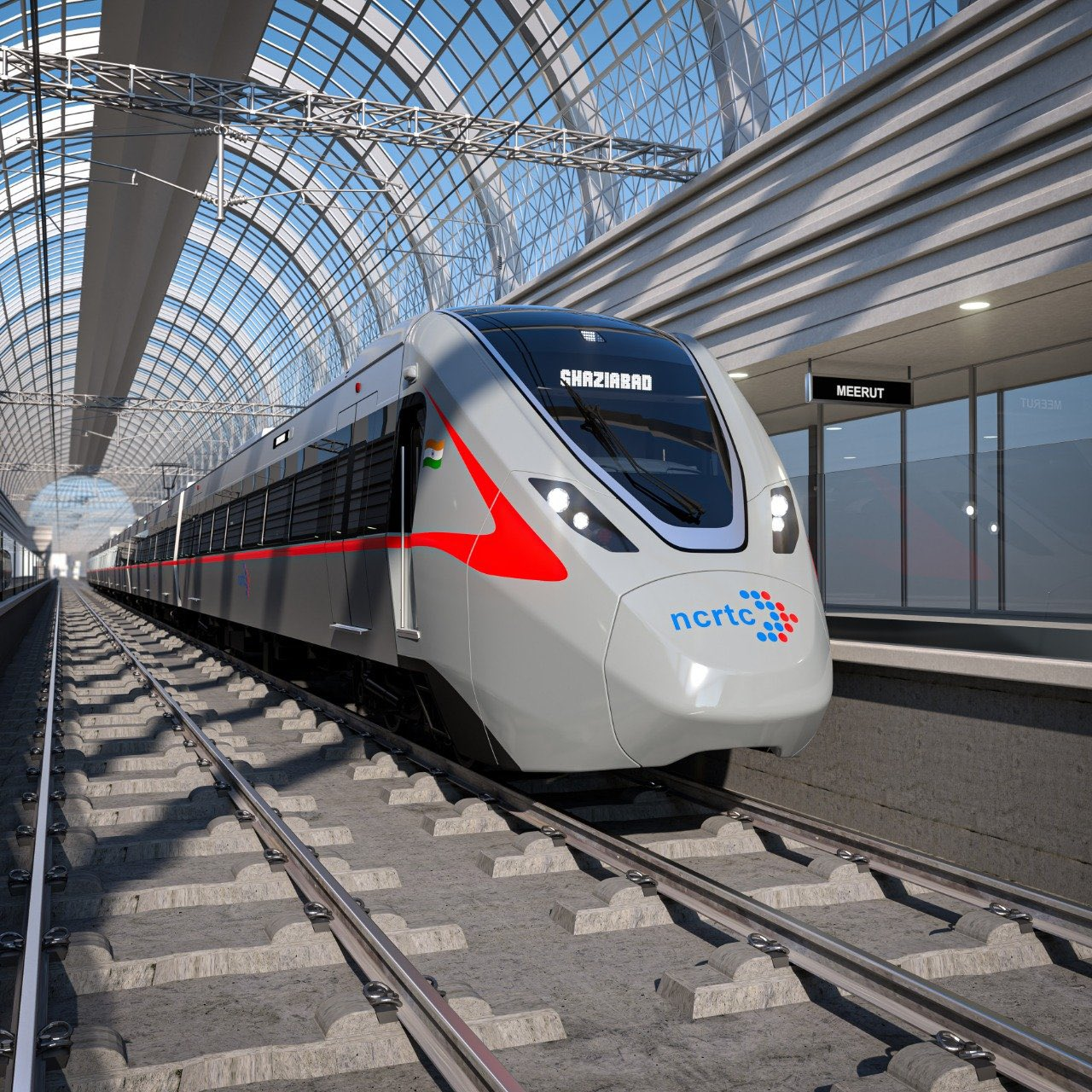

Delhi–Meerut Regional Rapid Transit System known as Delhi-Meerut RRTS is an 82.15 km (51.05 mi) long under-construction semi-high speed rail connecting Delhi, Ghaziabad, and Meerut. It is partly operational, with its priority section from Sahibabad to Muradnagar opened to public on 20 October 2023.

== Muradnagar RRTS Station ==
Murad Nagar RRTS station is an elevated RRTS station. This serves as a RRTS station for higher-speed trains on the Delhi–Meerut Regional Rapid Transit System that reaches speeds of upto 180 km/h.

After the trial run of Duhai - Meerut South RRTS stretch was commissioned successfully, this RRTS station was inaugurated by Prime Minister Narendra Modi on March 6, 2024 via video conferencing from Kolkata, and began its operations along with the existing 17-km Sahibabad-Duhai stretch of the Delhi–Meerut RRTS from March 7, 2024.
