= Duhai RRTS station =

RapidX's Delhi–Meerut RRTS station

Duhai

General information
- Location: Duhai, Basantpur Saitli, Ghaziabad, Uttar Pradesh 201003; India
- Coordinates: 28.72734°N 77.47179°E
- System: Namo Bharat RRTS station
- Owner: NCRTC
- Operator: NCRTC
- Line: Delhi–Meerut RRTS
- Platforms: Island platform Platform-1 → Duhai Depot; Platform-2 → Duhai Depot / Modipuram Side platform Platform-2 → Duhai Depot / Modipuram; Platform-3 → Sarai Kale Khan
- Tracks: 3

Construction
- Structure type: Elevated, Double track
- Platform levels: 2
- Parking: Four-Wheeler Parking
- Accessible: Yes

Other information
- Status: Operational

History
- Opened: 21 October 2023; 2 years ago
- Electrified: 25 kV 50 Hz AC through overhead catenary

Services
Preceding station	Namo Bharat	Following station
Guldhar towards Sarai Kale Khan	Delhi–Meerut	Duhai Depot Terminus
Guldhar towards Sarai Kale Khan	Delhi–Meerut	Murad Nagar towards Modipuram
Route map
Location

Duhai RRTS station is an elevated RRTS station in the Ghaziabad district of Uttar Pradesh, India. This will serve as a RRTS station for higher-speed trains on the Delhi–Meerut Regional Rapid Transit System that can reach speeds of up to 180 km/h.

Duhai RRTS station was commissioned on 20 October 2023 by Prime Minister Narendra Modi along with the 17 km long Sahibad-Duhaiyya section of Delhi–Meerut RRTS and was open to general public on 21 October 2023.

== History ==
The National Capital Region Transport Corporation (NCRTC) had invited tenders for the construction of the Duhai RRTS station along with the 4.5 km long Guldhar–Duhai section of the 82.15 km Delhi-Meerut RRTS line. Apco Infratech and China Railway First Group (JV) emerged as the lowest bidder for construction work. Under the agreement, companies started construction of Duhai RRTS station.

== Station layout ==
The Duhai RRTS station will have three levels - platform, concourse and street level. Duhai RRTS station will be 215 meters long and 26 meters wide. The rail tracks will be constructed at a height of 24 meters above the ground level.

G	Street level	Exit/Entrance
L1	Mezzanine	Fare control, station agent, Ticket/token, shops
L2	Platform 1 Eastbound	Towards → Duhai Depot (Operational during peak hours)
L2	Island platform | P1 doors will open on the right | P2 doors will open on the left
L2	Platform 2 Eastbound	Towards → Duhai Depot / Modipuram; Next Station: Murad Nagar
L2	Platform 3 Westbound	Towards ← Sarai Kale Khan; Next Station: DPS Rajnagar Guldhar
L2	Side platform | Doors will open on the left
L2

There are 4 Gate points – 1, 2, 3 and 4. Commuters can use either of the points for their travel:-

- Gate 1 - Towards Drizzling Land Water Park (Meerut Side)
- Gate 2 (Closed) - Towards Babu Banarasi Das Institute of Technology (Meerut Side)
- Gate 3 - Towards IAMR Group of Institutions (Delhi Side)
- Gate 4 - Towards Delhi Side
