= Bhudia =

- Village
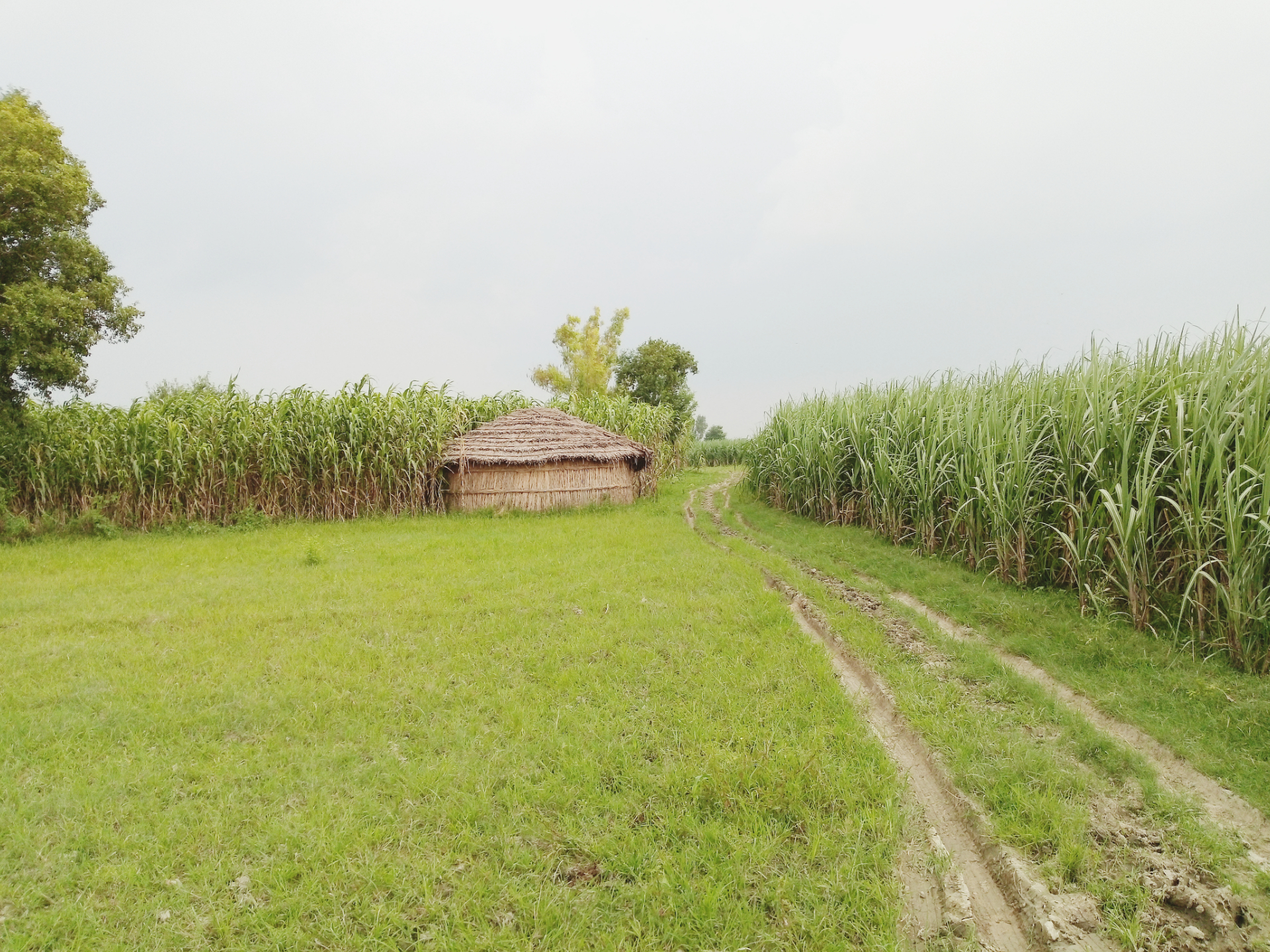
- Roadside view in (Dehar) Bhudia
- Nickname: Keshughari
- Location in Uttar Pradesh, India Bhudia (India)
- Coordinates: 28°35′03.9″N 77°44′07.0″E
- Country: India
- State: Uttar Pradesh
- District: Ghaziabad district, Uttar Pradesh
- Established: 1616

Government
  - Body: Gram panchayat
  - Gram pradhan: Rohit Baisla
- Elevation: 252 m (827 ft)

Population (2011)
  - Total: 1,272

Languages
  - Official: Hindi & Gujari
- Time zone: UTC+5:30 (IST)
- PIN: 245101
- Vehicle registration: UP 37

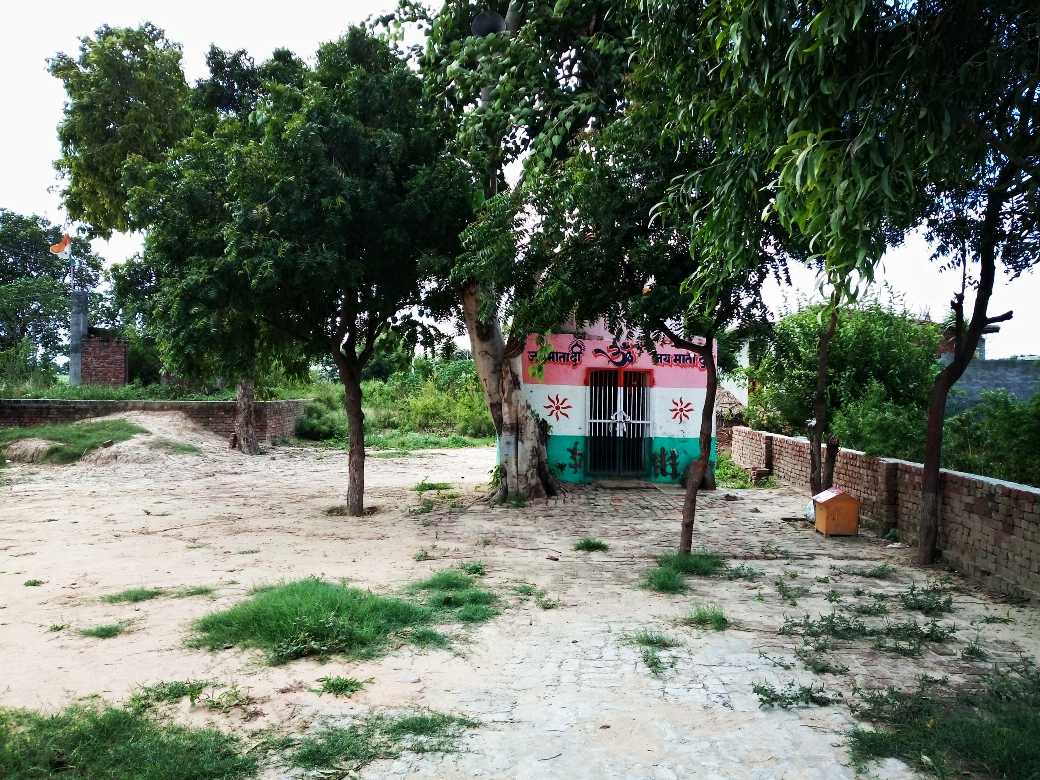
Mata Rani Temple Gom Bhudia.

Bhudia is a village in the Ghaziabad district of the Indian state of Uttar Pradesh. It is located 9 kilometres (5.6 mi) west of Gulaothi, 16 kilometres (9.9 mi) south of Hapur, 18 kilometres (11 mi) from Greater Noida and 56 kilometres (35 mi) from the Indian capital New Delhi.

It is located 9 km from its home town Gulaothi, 16 km from its district Hapur, 18 km from Noida, and 56 km from Delhi. A religious temple resides in the area, known to the locals as 'Jai Dhak Baba'.

As of the Indian Population Census of 2011, Bhudia contains a total 225 residing families. The population total is 1272, in which 675 are males and 597 are females. The population of children between the ages of 0-6 is 169, making up 13.29% of total population of the village. The Average Sex ratio is 884, which is lower than the Uttar Pradesh state average of 912. The Child Sex ratio is 1139, higher than the Uttar Pradesh average of 902.

The primary occupation of the villagers are farming and animal rearing.

== Pre-settlement ==
Around 1615, three Baislan elders left the Badoli village (located in present-day Haryana), where two settled in Meerut and the other settled in Dahirpur Rajjakpur, a nearby village of present Bhudia. Around 1755, with a much higher population, the villagers of Dahirpur Rajjakpur fought a war with the nearby Jats, where they won and was able to obtain their land and establish the Bhudia village.

== Administration ==
Bhudia is administrated by the Head of the Village, known as "Sarpanch (Pradhan)," who is elected representative of the village.
