= Gulaothi =

City in Uttar Pradesh, India

- Town
- Location in Uttar Pradesh, India Gulaothi (India)
- Coordinates: 28.6°N 77.78°E
- Country: India
- State: Uttar Pradesh
- District: Bulandshahr

Government
  - Type: Municipal Board
- Elevation: 200 m (660 ft)

Population (2011)
  - Total: 50,823

Language
  - Official: Hindi
  - Additional official: Urdu
- Time zone: UTC+5:30 (IST)
- Vehicle registration: UP-13

Gulaothi is a town, near Bulandshahr city in the Bulandshahr district that falls under the Meerut division of the Indian state of Uttar Pradesh. It has mixed Jat,Rajput and Gurjar villages.

== Geography ==
Gulaothi is located at 28.6°N 77.78°E. at a distance of 60 km from National Capital of India; New Delhi. It is located in India National Capital, New Delhi NCR (National Capital Region). It can be reached via Ghaziabad- Hapur NH-9, Bulandshahr - Meerut NH-334 or via Ghaziabad-Dasna-Masuri-Dhaulana State Highway. It has an average elevation of 200 metres (656 feet).

== Demographics ==
As of 2011 Indian Census, Gulaothi had a total population of 50,823, of which 26,738 were males and 24,085 were females. Population within the age group of 0 to 6 years was 7,933. The total number of literates in Gulaothi was 30,948, which constituted 60.9% of the population with male literacy of 67.4% and female literacy of 53.7%. The effective literacy rate of 7+ population of Gulaothi was 72.2%, of which male literacy rate was 80.2% and female literacy rate was 63.3%. The Scheduled Castes and Scheduled Tribes population was 4,738 and 1 respectively. Gulaothi had 7855 households in 2011.

As of 2001 India census, Gulaothi had a population of 42,872. Males constitute 53% of the population and females 47%. Gulaothi has an average literacy rate of 55%, lower than the national average of 59.5%: male literacy is 64%, and female literacy is 45%. In Gulaothi, 16% of the population is under 6 years of age.

== History ==
Gulaothi was earlier known as "Gulab Basi" because of large scale cultivation of Roses called "Gulab" in Devnagri Hindi. Gulaothi has been a great learning center of spiritualism and formal education. Seemingly this city is the birthplace of many great scholars like Qari Muhammed Miya Rehmatullah, who was the Shahi Imam of Eidgah Delhi and President of Jamiat Ulma -e- Hind, Delhi etc. There are several visiting places in Gulaothi like The Jama Masjid, Madarsa Mumbaul Uloom which was established by Maulana Qasim Nanautwi Rehmatullah, many old Mahales and the Old Bada Mandir are being one of them.

== Historical monuments ==
Gulaothi contains several historic religious structures, memorials, educational institutions, and colonial-era buildings associated with the cultural development of the town and the wider Bulandshahr district region.

=== Jama Masjid ===
The Jama Masjid of Gulaothi is among the oldest religious structures in the town and serves as an important center of Islamic worship and community life.

The mosque displays architectural features commonly associated with traditional north Indian mosque architecture, including arches, domes, and an open prayer courtyard. Local traditions associate parts of the structure with the late Mughal and early colonial periods, though the building has undergone several renovations over time.

The mosque remains an important religious landmark and attracts worshippers during major Islamic festivals such as Eid al-Fitr and Eid al-Adha.

=== Fatima ki Kothi ===
Fatima ki Kothi is a historic residential structure associated with late colonial-era architecture in western Uttar Pradesh. The building is known locally for its large courtyard-style layout and Indo-Islamic decorative elements.

According to local traditions, the kothi was associated with influential families of the town during the late nineteenth and early twentieth centuries. It is regarded as one of the older surviving heritage residences in Gulaothi.

=== Shaheed Smarak ===
Shaheed Smarak is a memorial dedicated to Indian freedom fighters associated with the Indian independence movement. The monument serves as a commemorative site honoring local and regional participants in anti-colonial movements during the British Raj.

The memorial is used during public ceremonies held on Independence Day and Republic Day.

=== Madarsa Mambaul Uloom ===
Madarsa Mambaul Uloom is an Islamic educational institution in Gulaothi and is among the older religious schools in the town.

The institution has historically served as a center for the study of Islamic theology, Arabic, Urdu literature, and traditional religious education. The madrasa complex also reflects aspects of traditional Islamic educational architecture found in western Uttar Pradesh.

=== Bada Mandir ===
Bada Mandir is one of the principal Hindu temples in Gulaothi and is an important religious site for the local population.

The temple is particularly active during Hindu festivals such as Janmashtami, Navaratri, and Diwali. Though parts of the current structure are modern, local traditions suggest the temple complex originated from an older shrine existing prior to the twentieth century.

=== Ancient Mahadev Temple ===
The Ancient Mahadev Temple is dedicated to Shiva and is considered one of the older religious structures in the town.

The temple attracts devotees during Maha Shivaratri and the month of Shravana. The present structure has undergone renovation several times while preserving elements of the earlier shrine.

=== Old mahals and havelis ===
Several older mahals, havelis, and merchant residences survive in parts of Gulaothi. Many of these structures date to the late nineteenth and early twentieth centuries and reflect a blend of Indo-Islamic and colonial architectural influences.

These buildings commonly feature carved wooden doors, internal courtyards, ornamental balconies, and thick masonry walls designed for climatic cooling. Although many have undergone alteration or partial deterioration, they remain part of Gulaothi's historical urban character.

== See also ==
- Bhudia
- Bhatona
- Bulandshahr
