= Garhmukteshwar =

- Town
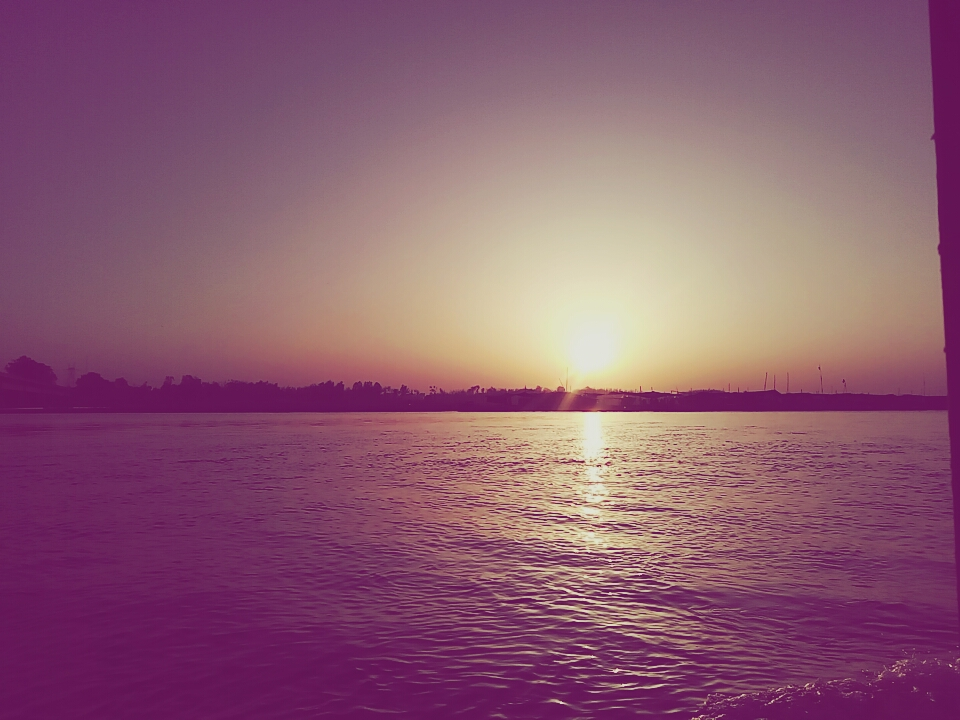
- View of Garh Ganga in Garhmukteshwar (Hapur), UP.
- Nickname: Garh Ganga
- Location in Uttar Pradesh, India Garhmukteshwar (India)
- Coordinates: 28°48′N 78°06′E
- Country: India
- State: Uttar Pradesh
- District: Hapur
- Named for: Mukteshwar Mahadev

Government
  - Type: Municipal Council
  - Body: Garhmukteshwar Municipal Council
  - Municipal Chairperson: Rakesh Kumar (BJP)
  - MLA: Harendra Singh Tewatia, (BJP)

Population (2011)
  - Total: 46,077

Languages
  - Official: Hindi
- Time zone: UTC+5:30 (IST)
- PIN: 245205
- Telephone code: 5731
- Vehicle registration: UP-37
- Website: www.nppgarhmukteshwar.com

Garhmukteshwar is a town, just outside of Hapur city, and tehsil in Hapur district of the Indian state of Uttar Pradesh. According to Census 2011 information the sub-district code of Garhmukteshwar block is 00741. Total area of Garhmukteshwar is 272 km^{2} including 237.38 km^{2} rural area and 34.13 km^{2} urban area. It has a population of 46,077. There are 64,688 houses in the sub-district. There are about 137 villages in Garhmukteshwar block. The city is part of the Delhi–NCR.

== History ==
Garhmukteshwar is an ancient settlement that is mentioned in the Bhagavata Purana and the Mahabharata. There are claims that it was a part of ancient Hastinapur, the capital of the Pandavas. An ancient fort, repaired by the Maratha leader Mir Bhawan, became, under the British, the headquarters of the tehsil. The name of the town is derived from the temple of Mukteshwar Mahadeva, dedicated to the goddess Ganga who is worshipped there in four temples. The town has 80 sati pillars, marking the spots where Hindu widows are said to have become "sati". The town also has a mosque, built by Gays-ud-din Balban, that bears an inscription in Arabic dating to 682 Hijri (1283 A.D.).

=== Partition violence ===
Garhmukteshwar was the scene of anti-Muslim violence in November 1946 when various areas of British India were experiencing significant communal unrest as the partition of the country into India and Pakistan loomed. Gyanendra Pandey describes the place as "a metaphor for the atrocities of Partition; and Partition itself a metaphor for the kind of extraordinary genocidal violence that was not witnessed again in India, perhaps until 1984". Official investigations into violence in Uttar Pradesh at that time note that there was a "desire for revenge" among both Hindus and Muslims, resulting from news of similar violence in Calcutta.

== Climate ==
Garhmukteshwar

Climate chart (precipitation, max. and min. temperature)
J	F	M	A	M	J	J	A	S	O	N	D
20 20 8	25 24 11	25 30 16	10 37 21	41 40 26	97 38 28	190 35 27	207 34 27	134 34 25	12 33 19	4 28 13	10 23 8
- █ Average max. and min. temperatures in °C
- █ Precipitation totals in mm
- Source: World Weather Service
Imperial conversion
J	F	M	A	M	J	J	A	S	O	N	D
0.8 68 46	1 75 52	1 86 61	0.4 99 70	1.6 104 79	3.8 100 82	7.5 95 81	8.1 93 81	5.3 93 77	0.5 91 66	0.2 82 55	0.4 73 46
- █ Average max. and min. temperatures in °F
- █ Precipitation totals in inches

Garhmukteshwar has a monsoon influenced humid subtropical climate characterized by very hot summers and cool winters. Summers last from early April to late June during and are extremely hot, with temperatures reaching 43 °C (109 °F). The monsoon arrives in late June and continues till the middle of September. Temperatures drop slightly, with plenty of cloud cover but with higher humidity. Temperatures rise again in October and the town then has a mild, dry winter season from late October to the middle of March Lowest temperature recorded is 0.5 °C (32.9 °F). Rainfall is about 80 cm to 100 cm per annum, which is suitable for growing crops. Most of the rainfall is received during the monsoon. Humidity varies from 30 to 100%. The town receives no snow.

Climate data for Garhmukteshwar
Month	Jan	Feb	Mar	Apr	May	Jun	Jul	Aug	Sep	Oct	Nov	Dec	Year
Record high °C (°F)	29 (84)	32 (90)	39 (102)	43 (109)	45 (113)	46 (115)	44 (111)	40 (104)	39 (102)	38 (100)	34 (93)	30 (86)	46 (115)
Mean daily maximum °C (°F)	22 (72)	26 (79)	30 (86)	38 (100)	43 (109)	42 (108)	40 (104)	36 (97)	37 (99)	32 (90)	29 (84)	25 (77)	33 (92)
Mean daily minimum °C (°F)	5 (41)	8 (46)	12 (54)	15 (59)	19 (66)	21 (70)	22 (72)	22 (72)	19 (66)	15 (59)	10 (50)	6 (43)	15 (58)
Record low °C (°F)	−2.5 (27.5)	−1 (30)	2 (36)	8 (46)	15 (59)	17 (63)	16 (61)	19 (66)	15 (59)	10 (50)	1 (34)	0 (32)	−2.5 (27.5)
Average rainfall mm (inches)	24 (0.9)	18 (0.7)	10 (0.4)	5 (0.2)	15 (0.6)	54 (2.1)	248 (9.8)	332 (13.1)	138 (5.4)	42 (1.7)	3 (0.1)	8 (0.3)	897 (35.3)
Average rainy days	2	1	1	0	1	3	9	11	4	1	0	0	33
Average relative humidity (%)	79	70	59	42	41	58	80	84	77	68	67	75	67
Source: Department of Meteorology, Ministry of Earth Sciences, Government of India

== Demographics ==
Garhmukhteshwar has a population of 46,077 of which 24,437 are males and 21,640 are females, per the 2011 Census of India.

== Location ==
Garhmukteshwar is situated on National Highway 9, which connects it to New Delhi, which is around 100 kilometres (62 mi) away, and puts the town, which is 5 kilometres (3.1 mi) from the Ganges River, on a direct route from India's capital city to that river.

== Railways ==
There are two railway stations in the city, named Garhmukteshwar and Garhmukteshwar Bridge (Brijghat). Both stations are situated on the Delhi–Moradabad line.

== Notable Persons ==
- Er.Udit Gupta

Government Contractor

- Kanak Agarwal

Adhti, Expller

- Shubham Chaudhary
- Adv. Aaftab Alam
- Adv. Naved Chaudhary

== See also ==
- Ghaziabad, Uttar Pradesh
- Siyana
- Bulandshahr
- Gajraula
- Amroha
- Hapur
