= Dhaulana =

- Tehsil
- Location in Uttar Pradesh, India Dhaulana (India)
- Coordinates: 28.39°N 77.39°E
- Country: India
- State: Uttar Pradesh
- District: [Hapur]
- Founder: Dhaul Singh
- Named for: Dhaul Singh

Government
  - Type: Constitutional Federal Republic
  - Body: Village Municipality, State and Center Government
  - Member Of State Legislative Assembly: Dharmesh Tomar
- Elevation: 250 m (820 ft)

Population
  - Total: 30,000

Languages
  - Official: Hindi
- Time zone: UTC+5:30 (IST)
- PIN: 245301
- Telephone code: 91-120
- Vehicle registration: UP-37
- Website: up.gov.in

Dhaulana is one of the three Tehsils of Hapur district of Uttar Pradesh, state of India. It was created on 28 September 2011 and comprises 91 Rajput (Thakur) villages. Dhaulana lies in Satha Chaurasi regions of Western Uttar Pradesh.

== About ==
Dhaulana is one of the biggest industrial towns in the National Capital Region of India, with a lot of factories working and a lot more in the process of construction, and not just the factories, it has a certain number of showrooms and outlets as well, such as Hero MotoCorp and LG Corporation, to name a few. Dhaulana is the commercial centre of Satha Chaurasi Area .

== Demographics ==
Ghaziabad Lok Sabha constituency has a diverse caste composition with Rajputs considered the most dominant community in the district. The constituency is estimated to have nearly 600,000 Rajput voters, around 550,000 Muslims, 450,000 Brahmins, 450,000 Scheduled Caste voters, 250,000 Banias, 125,000 Jats, 100,000 Punjabis, 75,000 Tyagis and 70,000 Gujjars.

The district has more than 150 Tomar (Tanwar) Rajput villages and over 84 Gehlot Rajput villages. The historic Satha-Chaurasi region also falls within the district, taking the total number of Rajput-dominated villages to over 250 across Ghaziabad district.

Several prominent Rajput leaders have represented the constituency, including Rajnath Singh, who was elected twice as Member of Parliament from Ghaziabad, General V. K. Singh, who also served two terms as MP, and Dr. Ramesh Chandra Singh Tomar, who represented the constituency five times in the Lok Sabha. Former MLA Sukhbir Singh Gehlot was also a notable Rajput leader from the region, reflecting the political influence of the Rajput community in Ghaziabad district.

== History ==
Dhaulana enjoys a great part in Indian History especially in British Era, like with the 1857 revolt in the city of Meerut being the origin of the revolution against the East India Company. The Rajputs of Satha- Chaurasi also left their home to be a part of this revolt and Thakur Jhanku Singh was the man leading the crowd. While protesting against East India Company the crowd went to the police station and burned down the whole thing, The then station incharge Mubarak Ali, showing cowardice ran away and hid in nearby villages to save his life and he later reached Meerut and informed Senior British Officials about the situation in Dhaulana.

Lala Jhanku Singhal along with thousand of men moved towards Delhi and upon reaching Red Fort he tore the symbol of East India Company waving and waved his Saffron Pagdi instead. This action was a humiliation to the East India Company and they were deeply humiliated. The East India Company along with large troop and Military Tanks reached Dhaulana and arrested 14 peoples named in the action including Thakur Makhan Gehlot, Thakur Chandan Singh, Thakur Jiraj Singh, Thakur Daulat Singh, Thakur Sumer Singh, Thakur Sahib Singh, Thakur Kiddha Singh, Thakur Maharaj Singh, Thakur Durga Singh, Thakur Jiya Singh, Thakur Masav Singh, Thakur Wajir Singh and Lala Jhankumal Singhal.
