= Meerut division =

Administrative division of Uttar Pradesh, India

Coordinates: 28.9900°N 77.7000°E

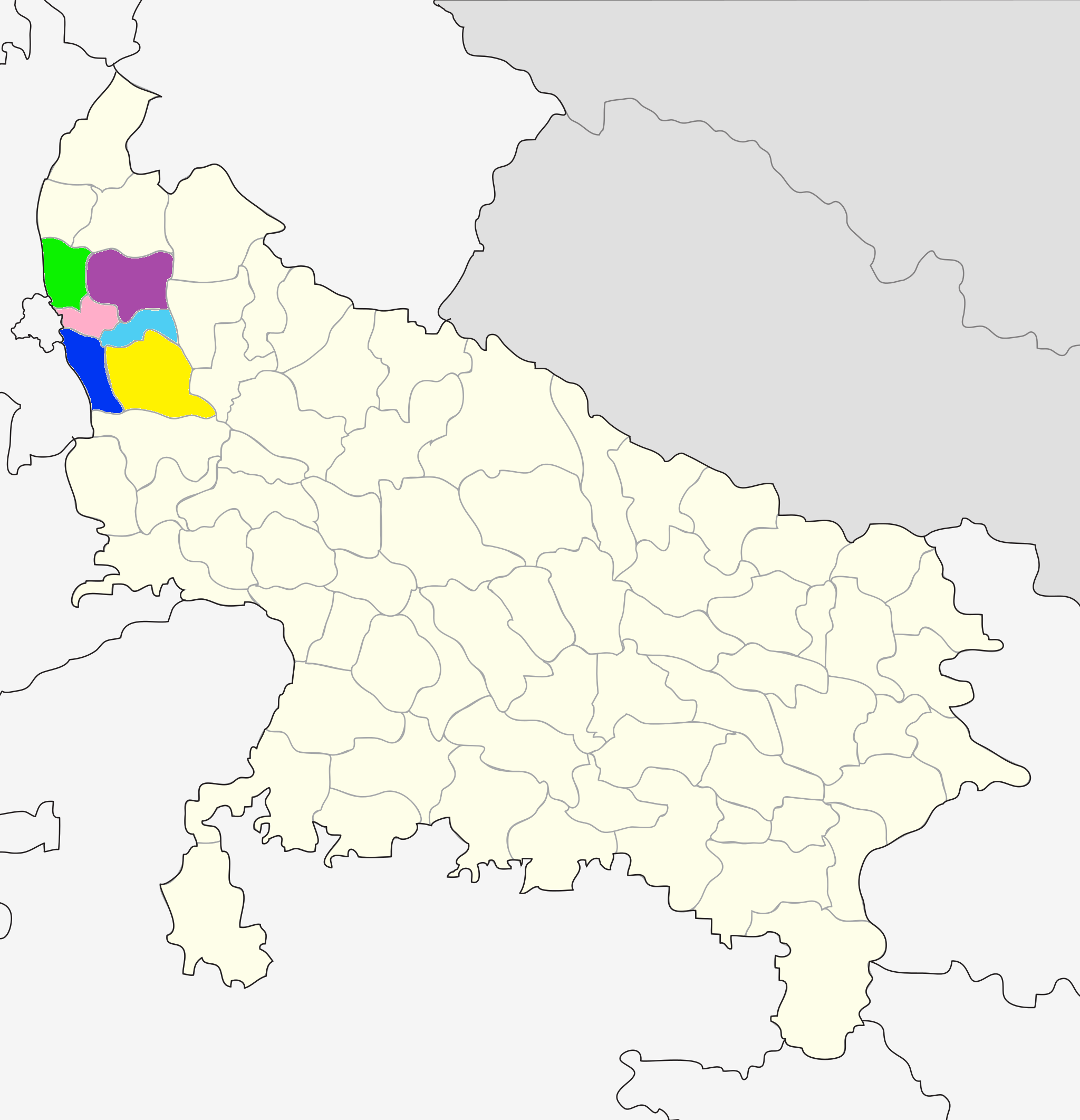
Different districts of Meerut division Baghpat Meerut Ghaziabad Hapur Gautam Buddha Nagar Bulandshahr

Meerut division (Hindi pronunciation: [meːɾəʈʰ]) is one of the 18 administrative geographical units (i.e. division) of the northern Indian state of Uttar Pradesh. Meerut city is the administrative headquarters of the division. It consists of 6 districts:-

- Meerut
- Baghpat
- Bulandshahr
- Gautam Buddha Nagar
- Ghaziabad
- Hapur

== Coverage ==
It is that area of Western Uttar Pradesh which is part of National Capital Region (NCR). All the districts, major cities and towns in this division are part of the NCR region of Uttar Pradesh. Ghaziabad, Noida were first to be added to NCR, later Meerut, Hapur, Muzaffarnagar, Bulandshahr and Baghpat were added. The region consists of nearly 37% of NCR area.

== Education ==
Higher government educational institutions in Meerut division are Chaudhary Charan Singh University (Meerut), LLRM Medical College (Meerut) and Gautam Buddha University (Greater Noida).
