= Satha Chaurasi =

Region in Western Uttar Pradesh, India

Satha Chaurasi (also known as Laghu Mewar) refers to an area in the west of the Indian state of Uttar Pradesh, where the majority population belongs to the members of the Rajputs (Thakur) community. It falls within the boundaries of the Ghaziabad, Meerut and Muzaffarnagar Lok Sabha constituencies.

Satha translates as group of sixty(60) Sisodia Rajput villages and chaurasi as group of eighty-four(84) Tomar or Tanwar Rajput villages. The villages of Satha-Chaurasi region are known as the ‘warrior villages’ maybe due to their historical importance. These numbers may have had a significant socio-political context in the medieval period as a definition of scope for territorial and lineal boundaries.

== History ==
The region includes Ghaziabad, Hapur, Gautam Budh Nagar district, Bulandshahr, Dadri, Baghpat, Meerut and Muzaffarnagar.

This area was settled between the 10th and 11th. There are 60 (Satha) villages of Gehlot Rajputs (Sisodias), the descendants of Rawal Khumaan I, son of founder of Mewar, Bappa Rawal. It is believed that two brothers from the Guhilot royal family of Mewar, Rana Vakshraj Singh and Rana Hastraj Singh, established their new kingdoms in Uttar Pradesh. Rana Vakshraj Singh settled 60 Guhilaut (Sisodia) villages in the Dadri-Dhaulana area, while Rana Hastraj Singh founded the town of Hathras. Dehra village became the headquarters of Shishodia's, seven generations later, three princes Rana Sahajpal, Rana Jaspal, and Rana Bhanwar Pal continued the legacy by establishing new villages in the area.

There are 84 (Chaurasi) villages of the Tomar Rajputs, founded by Ajaypal Tomar, the younger brother of Anangpal Tomar, in the 11th century while the descendants of Maharaja Anangpal Tomar set up camp near Sanskar College of Parson in 1178 AD after returning from Ganga Snan. From here Rishi Galav established Galand which is the largest village of Tomar Rajputs. The Sisodias are believed to be of Suryanvanshi Kshatriya lineage while the Tomars are believed to be of Chandravanshi Kshatriya lineage thus for the same reason marriages take place between the Sisodias and Tomars from the ancient time and still the same continues.

The region also played a significant role during the Indian Rebellion of 1857. Fourteen martyrs from the Dhaulana Tehsil were executed by the British, leaving behind a legacy of bravery and sacrifice.
