= Hapur =

Hapur Haripur
- City
- Location in Uttar Pradesh, India Hapur (India)
- Coordinates: 28.730937°N 77.775736°E
- Country: India
- State: Uttar Pradesh
- Division: Meerut
- District: Hapur

Government
  - Type: Municipal Council
  - Body: Hapur Municipal Council
  - Municipal Chairperson: Pushpa Devi (BSP)
  - MLA: Vijay Pal (BJP)
  - District Magistrate: Abhishek Pandey , IAS
  - SP: Kunwar Gyananjay Singh, IPS
- Elevation: 216.1032 m (709.000 ft)

Population (2011)
  - Total: 317,004

Languages
  - Official: Hindi
  - Native: Khariboli
- Time zone: UTC+5:30 (IST)
- PIN: 245101
- 0122: 5731
- Vehicle registration: UP-37
- Website: http://hapur.nic.in/

Hapur is a city and the administrative headquarters of Hapur district, in Uttar Pradesh, India. Located about 60 kilometres (37 mi) east of New Delhi, the city is part of the Delhi National Capital Region (NCR). National Highway 9 passes through the city, connecting it to Delhi.

== History ==
Hapur is said to have been founded in the tenth century.

Hapur is listed in the Ain-i-Akbari as a pargana under Delhi sarkar, producing a revenue of 2,103,589 dams for the imperial treasury and supplying a force of 300 infantry and 4 cavalry.

It was granted by Daulat Scindia to his French general Pierre Cuillier-Perron at the end of the 18th century. Under the British Raj, Hapur was within Meerut District, was surrounded by several fine groves, and carried on considerable trade in sugar, jaggery (gur), grain, cotton, timber, bamboo, and brass and steel utensils. Hapur participated heavily in the 1857 Rebellion led by the local Gurjar Zamindars The important cavalry remount depot and farm of Babugarh adjoined the town. Earlier it was within Ghaziabad district but in 2012 it became a separate district. It comes within Meerut commissionaire.

== Geography ==
Hapur is located at 28.72°N 77.78°E. It has an average elevation of 213 metres (699 feet) (higher than its neighbours).

== Climate ==
Hapur has a monsoon-influenced humid subtropical climate characterised by very hot summers and cool winters. Summers last from early April to late June and are extremely hot, with temperatures reaching 43 °C (109 °F). The monsoon arrives in late June and continues until the middle of September. Temperatures drop slightly, with plenty of cloud cover, but with higher humidity. Temperatures rise again in October; and the city then has a mild, dry winter season from late October to the middle of March.

Rainfall is about 90 cm to 100 cm per annum, which is suitable for growing crops. Most of the rainfall is received during the monsoon. Humidity varies from 30 to 100%.

Climate data for Hapur(1971–2000)
Month	Jan	Feb	Mar	Apr	May	Jun	Jul	Aug	Sep	Oct	Nov	Dec	Year
Record high °C (°F)	29.3 (84.7)	32.2 (90.0)	39.5 (103.1)	43.5 (110.3)	45.8 (114.4)	46.1 (115.0)	46.0 (114.8)	40.0 (104.0)	39.0 (102.2)	38.0 (100.4)	34.5 (94.1)	30.0 (86.0)	46.1 (115.0)
Mean daily maximum °C (°F)	21.9 (71.4)	23.1 (73.6)	28.7 (83.7)	36.3 (97.3)	39.1 (102.4)	37.6 (99.7)	33.6 (92.5)	32.6 (90.7)	33.7 (92.7)	32.8 (91.0)	28.6 (83.5)	23.5 (74.3)	31.1 (88.0)
Mean daily minimum °C (°F)	7.2 (45.0)	9.1 (48.4)	13.8 (56.8)	19.9 (67.8)	24.3 (75.7)	26.0 (78.8)	25.9 (78.6)	25.5 (77.9)	23.6 (74.5)	18.2 (64.8)	12.4 (54.3)	8.0 (46.4)	17.7 (63.9)
Record low °C (°F)	0.2 (32.4)	0.1 (32.2)	5.4 (41.7)	8.3 (46.9)	15.4 (59.7)	17.7 (63.9)	16.5 (61.7)	19.0 (66.2)	15.7 (60.3)	7.2 (45.0)	1.8 (35.2)	0.2 (32.4)	0.1 (32.2)
Average precipitation mm (inches)	19.7 (0.78)	24.9 (0.98)	24.4 (0.96)	12.8 (0.50)	19.1 (0.75)	101.2 (3.98)	299.0 (11.77)	264.7 (10.42)	115.4 (4.54)	25.9 (1.02)	4.3 (0.17)	13.4 (0.53)	945.0 (37.20)
Average rainy days	1.5	1.7	1.7	0.9	1.6	4.9	11.2	9.4	6.2	1.6	0.4	0.9	42.0
Source: India Meteorological Department (record high and low up to 2010)

== Demographics ==
Religions in Hapur (2011)
Religion	Percent
Hinduism	66.27%
Islam	32.12%
Sikhism	0.82%
Other or not stated	0.79%
Distribution of religions

According to the 2011 census, Hapur had a population of 262,983, consisting of 139,525 males and 123,458 females. The literacy rate was 63.40%: 80.66% for males and 66.59% for females. 14.35% of the population was from 0–6 years. Scheduled Castes make up 29.62% of the population.

Hinduism is the majority religion in Hapur city, with 174,278 (66.27%) followers. Islam is the second-most popular religion in Hapur, with 84,477 (32.12%). Followers of Sikhism number 2,163 (0.82%), Jainism 981 (0.37%), Christianity 765 (0.29%), and Buddhism 162 (0.06%). Approximately 156 (0.06%) stated "No Particular Religion" and 1 (0.00%) stated "Other Religion".

Languages in Hapur (2011)
1. Hindi (80.4%)
2. Urdu (18.3%)
3. Others (1.26%)

Hindi is the most spoken language. Other languages such as Urdu are spoken by a minority.

== Hapur-Pilkhuwa Development Authority ==
Many high-standard educational and research institutes are being established in the Hapur-Pilkhuwa Development Region, e.g. a dental college and research institute, engineering colleges, commerce colleges a Delhi Public School branch, and other educational and research centres. Similarly, in housing development, many famous developers like Ansal Housing Group, Eros Group, etc., are investing large amounts of money in constructing housing for the town.

== Notable people ==
- Charan Singh, the former prime minister of India, was born in the village of Noorpur, Hapur.

== See also ==
- Asouda
- Bhudia
- Dhaulana
- Garhmukteshwar
- Rafiq Nagar
