= Hapur district =

Coordinates: 28.7309°N 77.7757°E

- District of Uttar Pradesh
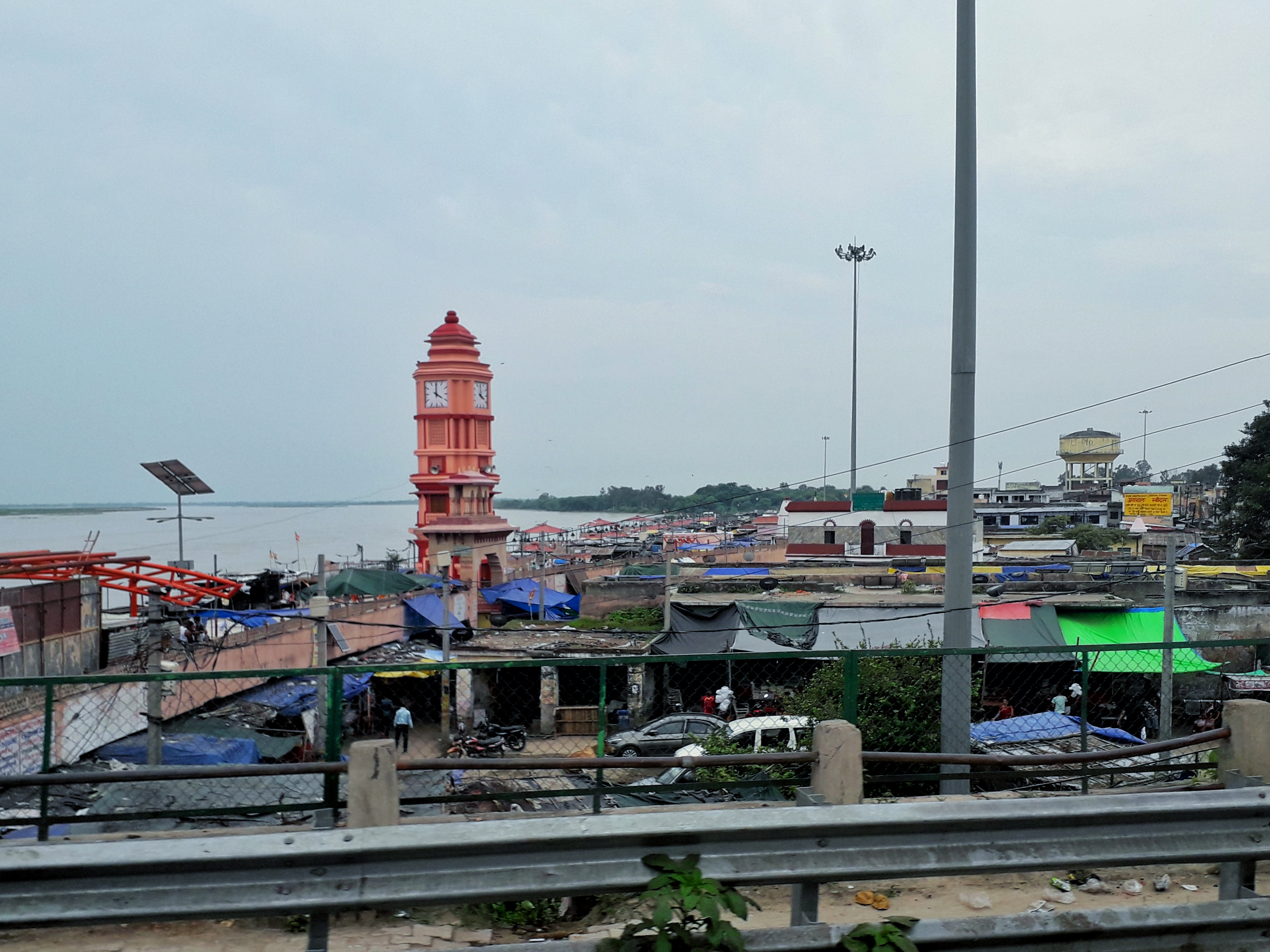
- Brajghat in Garhmukteshwar

- Location of Hapur district in Uttar Pradesh
- Country: India
- State: Uttar Pradesh
- Division: Meerut
- Headquarters: Hapur
- Tehsils: Hapur, Garhmukteshwar, Dhaulana

Government
  - District Magistrate: Mr. Abhishek Pandey, IAS
  - Superintendent of Police: Kunwar Gyananjay Singh, IPS

Area
  - Total: 660 km^{2} (250 sq mi)

Population (2011)
  - Total: 1,338,311
  - Density: 2,000/km^{2} (5,300/sq mi)
- Time zone: UTC+05:30 (IST)
- Website: hapur.nic.in

Hapur district (earlier Panchsheel Nagar) is a recently formed district in the Indian state of Uttar Pradesh with a population of about 1,338,211 at the 2011 Census. It arose as an area leading in the trade of grains and jaggery. This district on the Ganges river is 60 kilometres (37 mi) from New Delhi. Being located on the river could be a reason for its prosperity in trade. It is the smallest district of Uttar Pradesh.

== Demographics ==
According to Official voter data published by the Election Commission of India, has provided community-wise estimates for the Ghaziabad Lok Sabha constituency.

Ghaziabad Lok Sabha constituency has a diverse caste composition with Rajputs considered the most dominant community in the district. The constituency is estimated to have nearly 600,000 to 7 lakh Rajput voters, around 550,000 Muslims, 450,000 Brahmins, 450,000 Scheduled Caste voters, 250,000 Banias, 125,000 Jats, 100,000 Punjabis, 75,000 Tyagis and 70,000 Gujjars.

The district has more than 150 Tomar (Tanwar) Rajput villages and over 84 Gehlot Rajput villages. The historic Satha-Chaurasi region also falls within the district, taking the total number of Rajput-dominated villages to over 250 across Ghaziabad district. Several prominent Rajput leaders have represented the constituency, including Rajnath Singh, who was elected twice as Member of Parliament from Ghaziabad, General V. K. Singh, who also served two terms as MP, and Dr. Ramesh Chandra Singh Tomar, who represented the constituency five times in the Lok Sabha. Former MLA Sukhbir Singh Gehlot was also a notable Rajput leader from the region, reflecting the political influence of the Rajput community in Ghaziabad district.

== History ==
The new district Panchsheel Nagar, was created from the tehsils of Hapur, Garhmukteshwar and Dhaulana (which were previously part of Ghaziabad district) as one of three new districts of Uttar Pradesh on 28 September 2011. U.P. Chief Minister Mayawati justified the decision by declaring that Ghaziabad district was "far too big for administrative efficiency", and that creating smaller districts conformed to the ideas proposed by social reformers B. R. Ambedkar and Jyotirao Phule.

The district was renamed from Panchsheel Nagar to Hapur district on 23 July 2012. Hapur district is a part of Meerut division.

== Government ==
It falls within the National Capital Region of India but comes under the state legislature of Uttar Pradesh.

=== Administrative divisions ===
Hapur district contains three Tehsils: Hapur, Garhmukteshwar and Dhaulana.

== Demographics ==
Religions in Hapur district (2011)
Religion	Percent
Hinduism	66.81%
Islam	32.39%
Other or not stated	0.80%
Distribution of religions

The district population at the 2011 census was 1,338,311. Hapur has a sex ratio of 887 females per 1000 males. 409,747 (30.62%) lived in urban areas. Scheduled Castes made up 293,410 (21.92%) of the population.

Languages of Hapur district (2011)
1. Hindi (82.8%)
2. Urdu (16.7%)
3. Others (0.45%)

At the 2011 census, 82.84% of the population spoke Hindi and 16.71% Urdu as their first language.

== Economy ==
Major industries in the district are food processing, paper, textiles and steel tube production.

== Notable people ==
- Charan Singh
