= Ghaziabad district =

Coordinates: 28.6667°N 77.4333°E

- District of Uttar Pradesh
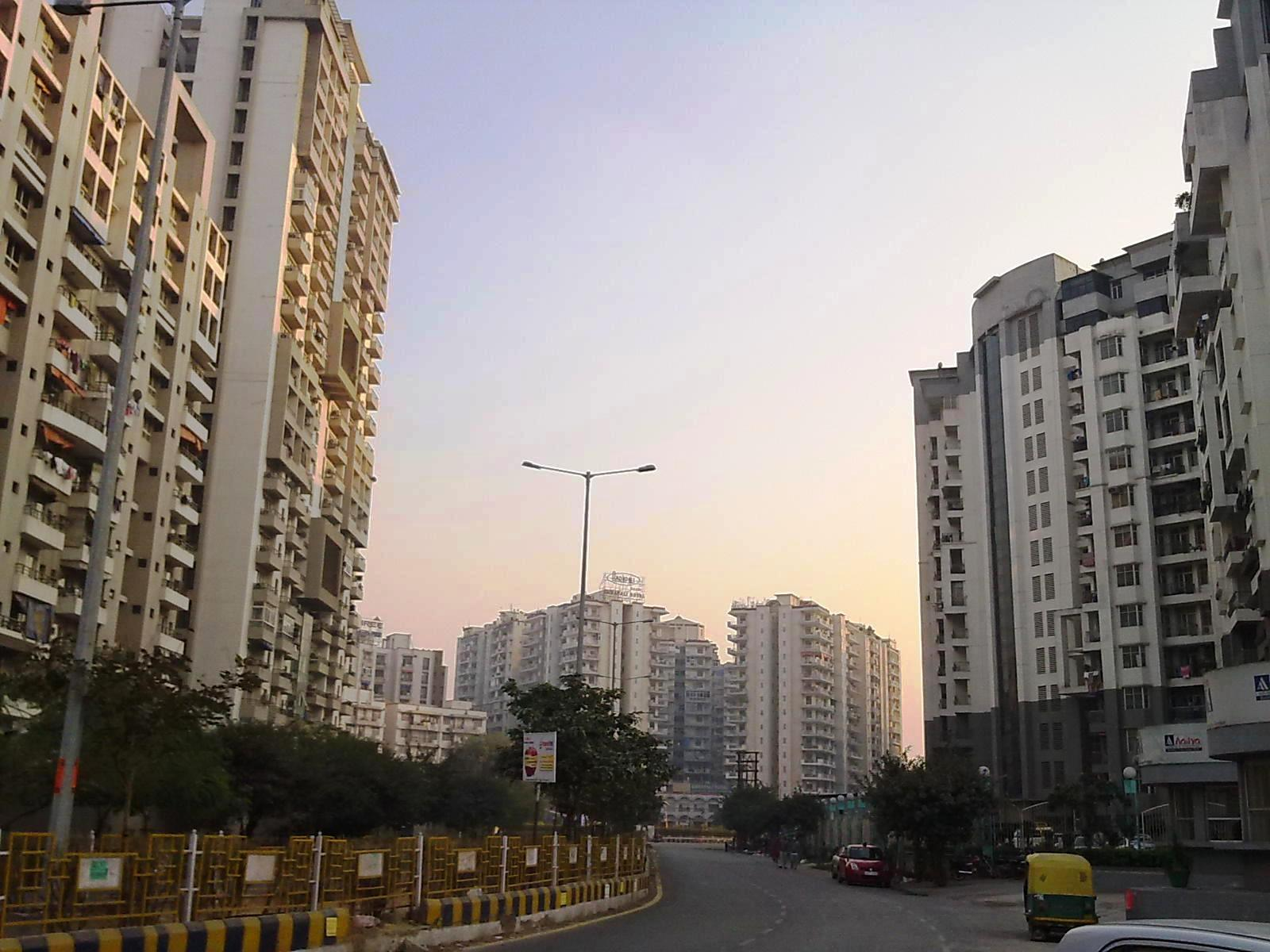
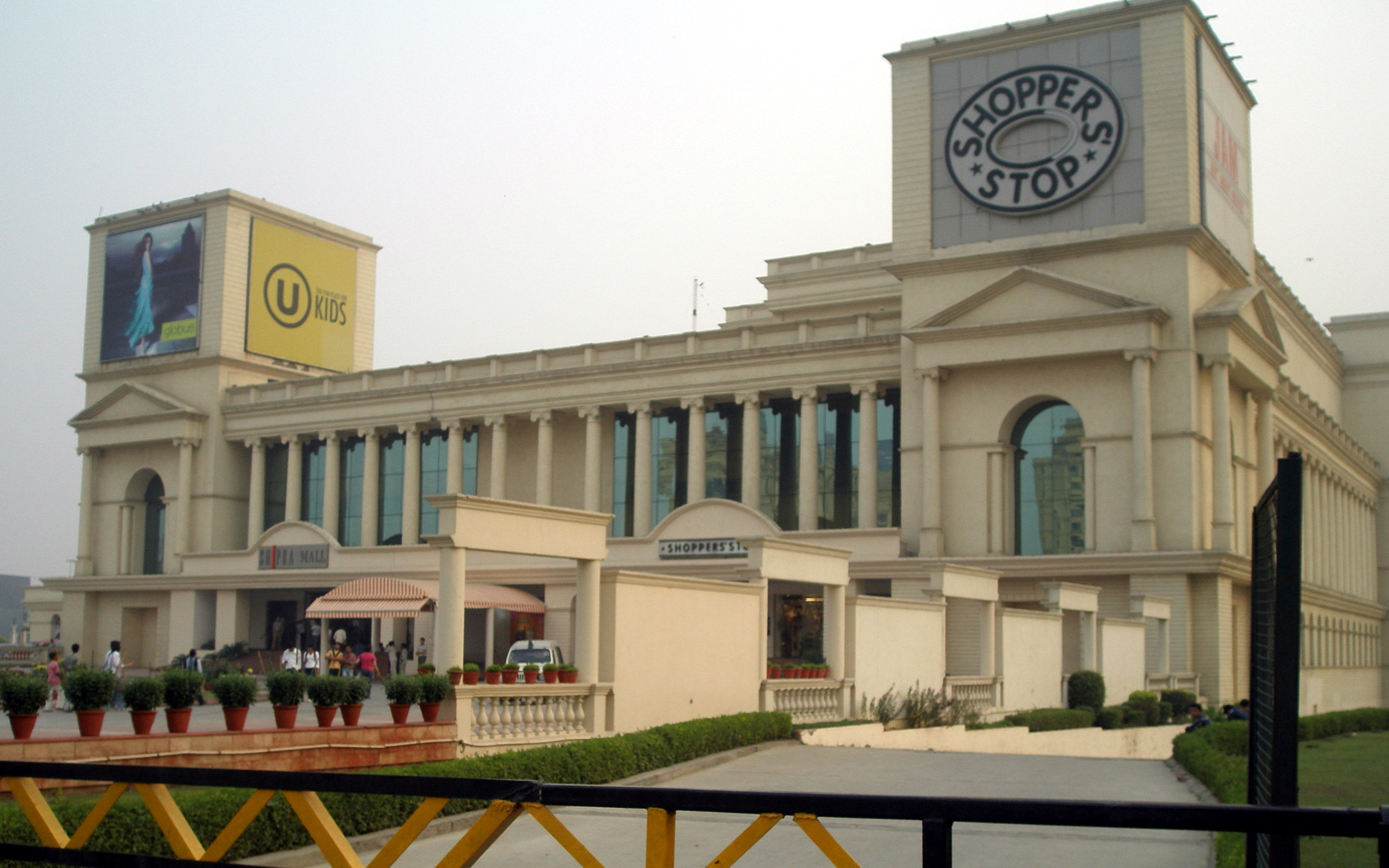
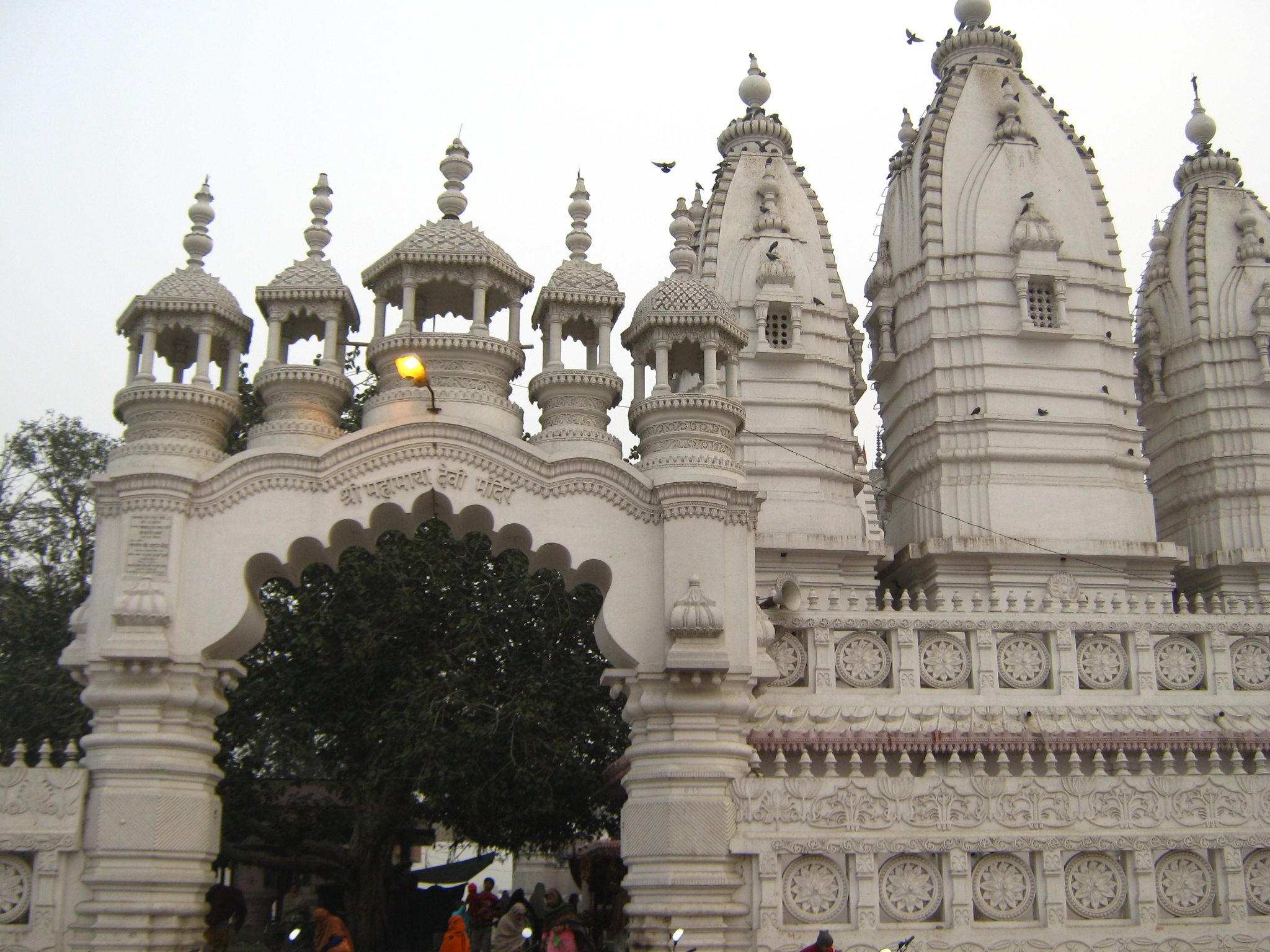
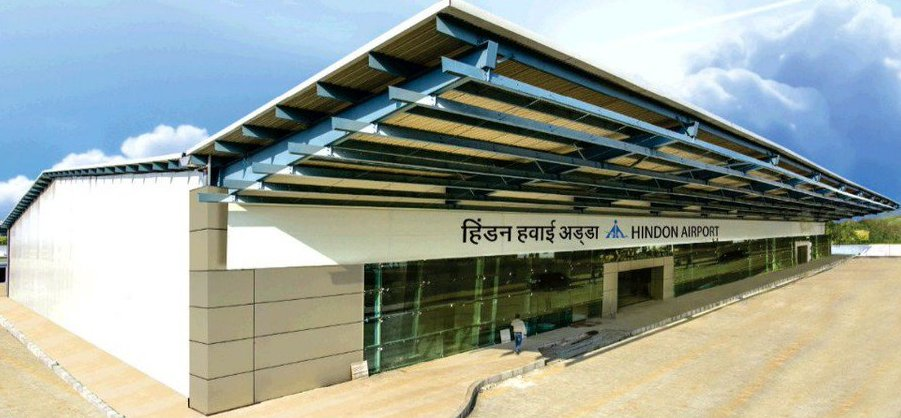
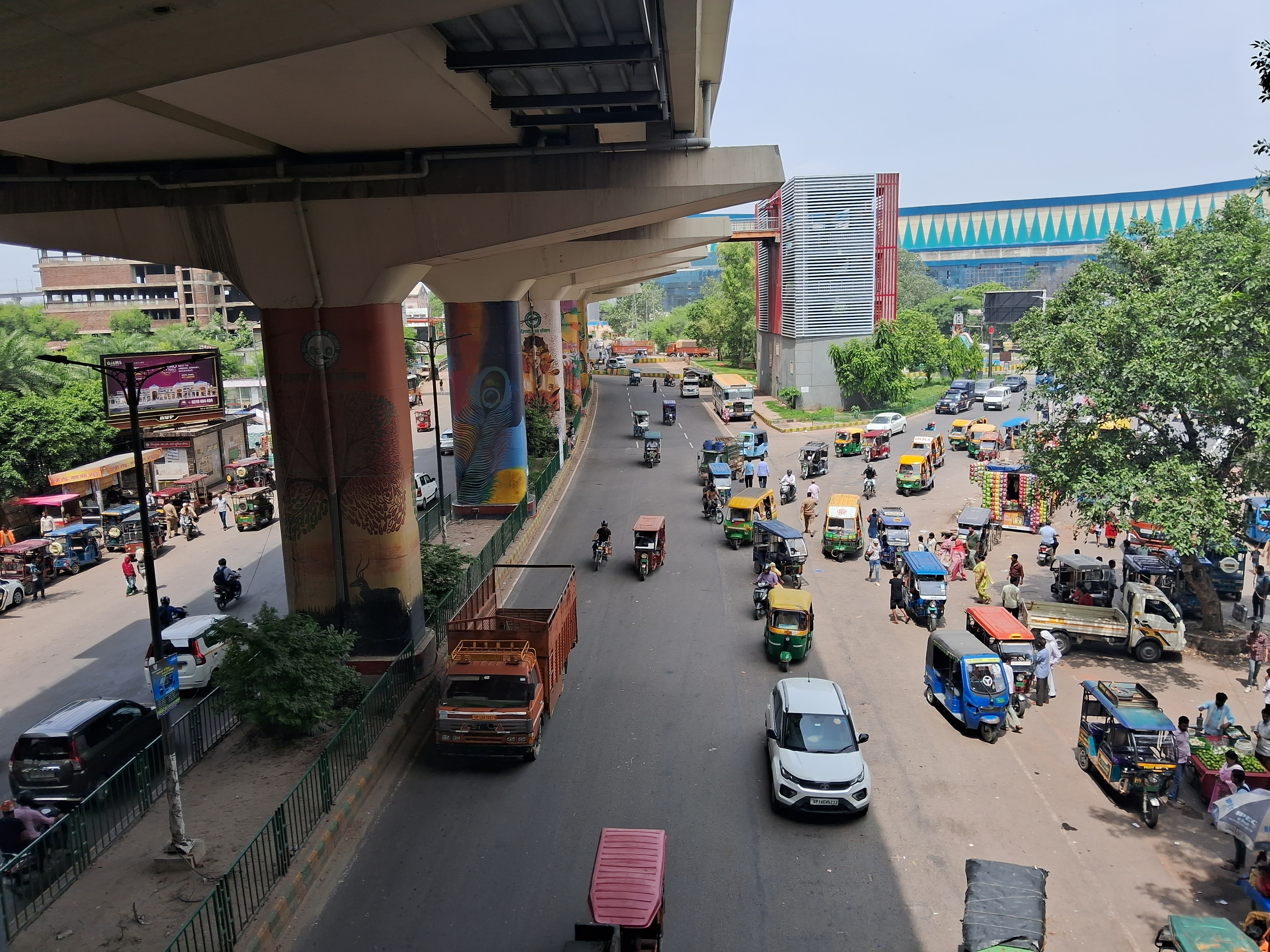
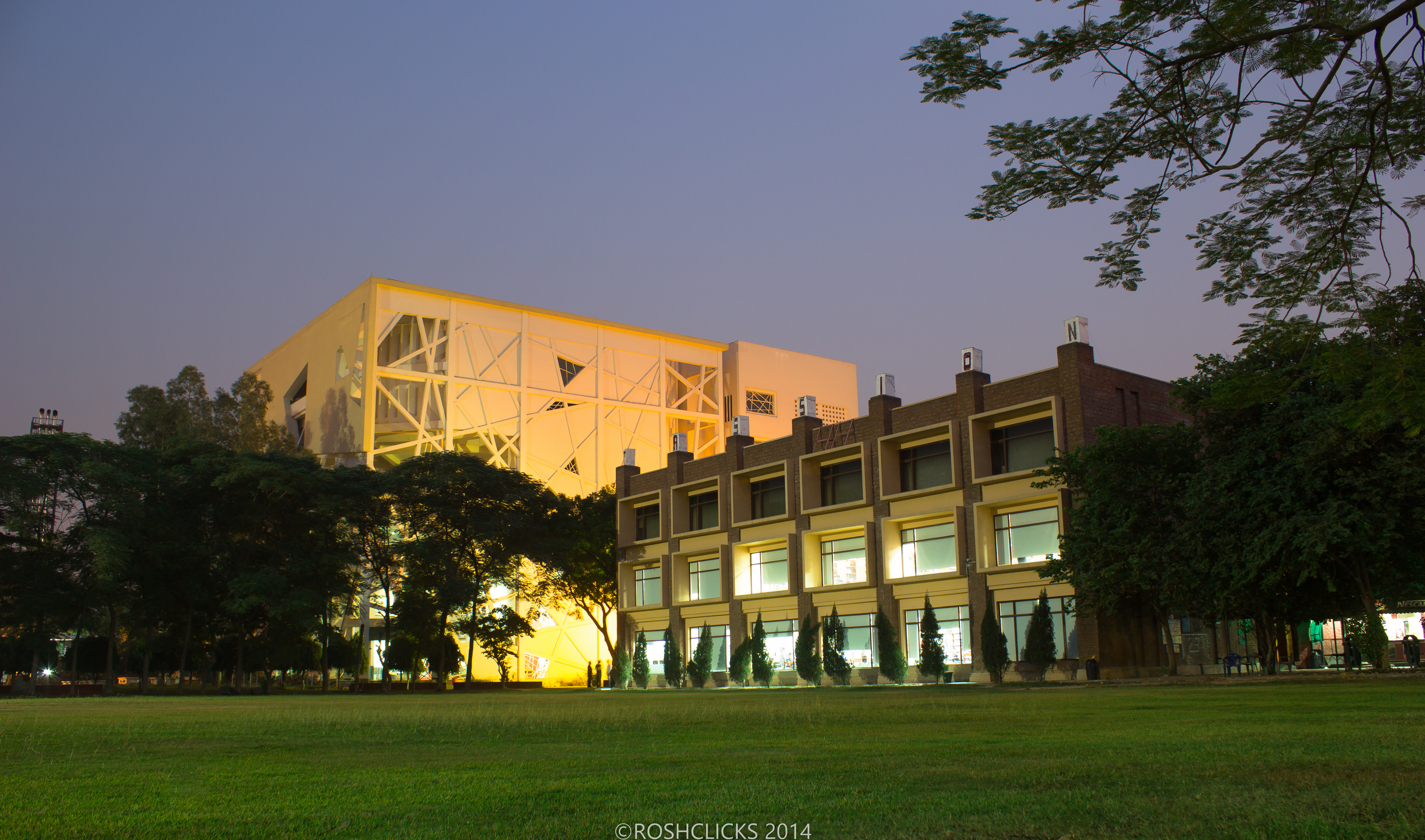
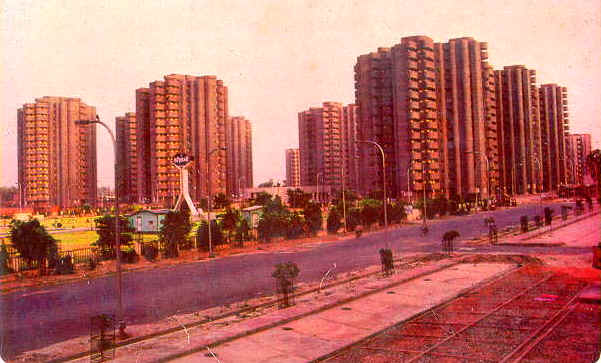
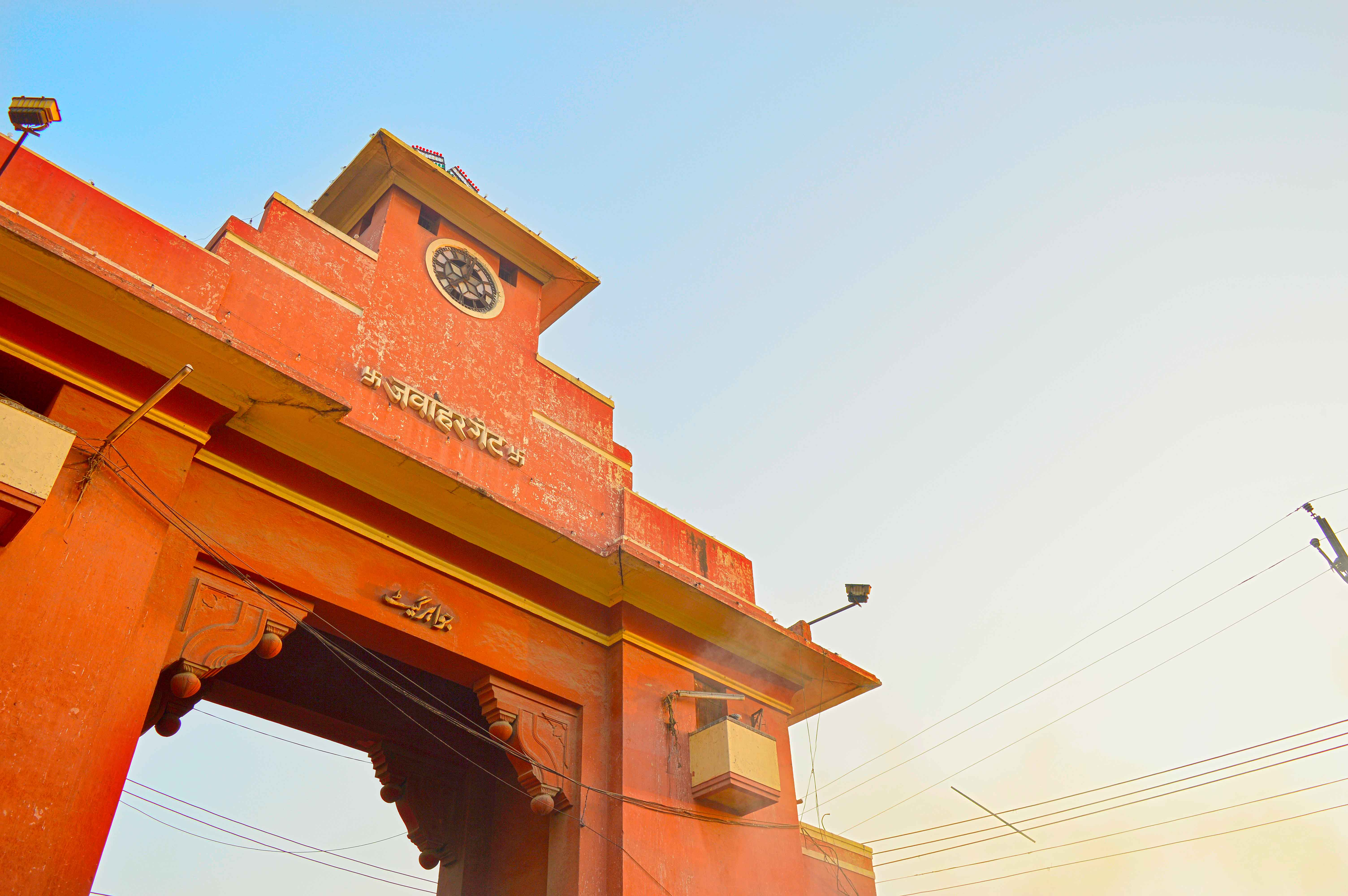
- Clockwise from Top: Indirapuram Skyline, Shipra Mall, Mahamaya Mandir, Modinagar, Hindon Airport, Delhi-Meerut road, Ghaziabad, Institute of Management Technology, Kaushambi Skyline and Clock House

- Location of Ghaziabad district in Uttar Pradesh
- Country: India
- State: Uttar Pradesh
- Division: Meerut
- Headquarters: Ghaziabad
- Tehsils: 1. Ghaziabad; 2. Modinagar; 3. Loni

Government
  - Lok Sabha constituencies: 1. Meerut (shared with Meerut district) 2. Ghaziabad
  - Vidhan Sabha constituencies: 5

Area
  - Total: 1,034 km^{2} (399 sq mi)

Population
  - Total: 3,343,334
  - Density: 3,233/km^{2} (8,374/sq mi)
  - Urban: 67.55%

Demographics
  - Literacy: 85%
  - Sex ratio: 860 (2001)
- Time zone: UTC+05:30 (IST)
- Major highways: NH58, NH24, NH91

Ghaziabad district (pronounced [ɣaːziːaːˈbaːd̪ ˈzɪla]) is a largely suburban district of Uttar Pradesh state in northern India. It is also a core part of the National Capital Region. The city of Ghaziabad is the administrative headquarters of the district. This district is part of Meerut Division. It has become a major bedroom community for Delhi.

== History ==
Before 1976, the area of Ghaziabad district was categorized as Ghaziabad Tehsil of Meerut district. On 14 November 1976, then Chief Minister of Uttar Pradesh N.D. Tiwari declared it as a separate district with an area of 2550 km^{2}.

The district was further reduced in size to 1933 km^{2} on 6 September 1997 when the Government of Uttar Pradesh carved out the blocks of Dadri and Bisrakh to create Gautam Buddh Nagar district.

In September 2011, the Hapur tehsil was split off (from Ghaziabad district) to form Hapur District by then Chief Minister Mayawati, finally reducing the size of Ghaziabad district to 1273 km^{2} and the revised population is 1,422,000.

== Demographics ==
According to Official voter data published by the Election Commission of India,has provided community-wise estimates for the Ghaziabad Lok Sabha constituency. Ghaziabad Lok Sabha constituency has a diverse caste composition with Rajputs considered the most dominant community in the district. The constituency is estimated to have nearly 600,000 to 7 lakh Rajput voters, around 550,000 Muslims, 450,000 Brahmins, 450,000 Scheduled Caste voters, 250,000 Banias, 125,000 Jats, 100,000 Punjabis, 75,000 Tyagis and 70,000 Gujjars. The district has more than 150 Tomar (Tanwar) Rajput villages and over 84 Gehlot Rajput villages. The historic Satha-Chaurasi region also falls within the district, taking the total number of Rajput-dominated villages to over 250 across Ghaziabad district. Several prominent Rajput leaders have represented the constituency, including Rajnath Singh, who was elected twice as Member of Parliament from Ghaziabad, General V. K. Singh, who also served two terms as MP, and Dr. Ramesh Chandra Singh Tomar, who represented the constituency five times in the Lok Sabha. Former MLA Sukhbir Singh Gehlot was also a notable Rajput leader from the region, reflecting the political influence of the Rajput community in Ghaziabad district.

=== COVID-19 pandemic in Ghaziabad ===
The first positive case of COVID-19 was confirmed on 5 March 2020 as a businessman resident of Raj Nagar Extension area of Ghaziabad city who returned from Iran.

By June 30, Ghaziabad had highest number of active COVID-19 cases in the state. As of August 21, it had a total of 7,049 confirmed COVID-19 cases, which included 5,846 patients (82.93%) discharged and 67 dead, apart from 1,136 active cases. It had 338 active containment zones in different parts.

== Geography ==
The district is bounded on the northwest by Baghpat District, on the north by Meerut District, on the east by Hapur District, on the southeast by Bulandshahr District, on the southwest by Gautam Buddha Nagar District, and on the west by Delhi state across the Yamuna River. The Hindon River flows through the district.

== Demographics ==
Religions in residual Ghaziabad district (2011)
Religion	Percent
Hinduism	75.38%
Islam	22.53%
Sikhism	0.56%
Christianity	0.49%
Jainism	0.46%
Other or not stated	0.58%
Distribution of religions

According to the 2011 Census, it is the third most populous district of Uttar Pradesh (out of 75), after Prayagraj and Moradabad.

According to the 2011 census of Ghaziabad district, it has a population of 4,681,645, roughly equal to the nation of Ireland or the US state of South Carolina. This gives it a ranking of 28th highest in India (out of a total of 640). The district has a population density of 3,967 inhabitants per square kilometre (10,270/sq mi). Its population growth rate over the decade 2001–2011 was 41.66%. Ghaziabad has a sex ratio of 878 females for every 1000 males, and a literacy rate of 85%.

At the 2011 census, this district had a population of 4,661,452 (3rd highest in UP), with 2,481,803 males and 2,179,649 females. This is revised to 3,323,241 after Hapur district was split off. Ghaziabad district comprises 2.33% of the total population of UP. It has the highest density of population in the state with 4060 persons per square km. It is also second in population growth rate with a 40.66% rise. The average literacy rate in 2011 was 85%, which was the highest in UP.

After bifurcation, residual Ghaziabad district has a population of 3,343,334. The sex ratio is 878 females per 1000 males. 2,752,800 (82.34%) lived in urban areas. Scheduled Castes made up 480,053 (14.36%) of the population.

=== Language ===
Languages of residual Ghaziabad district (2011)
1. Hindi (94.2%)
2. Urdu (3.90%)
3. Others (1.89%)

At the time of the 2011 census, 94.21% of the population spoke Hindi and 3.90% Urdu as their first language.
