= List of Rajputs =

Notable members of the Rajput community

This is a list of notable members of the Rajput community.

== Saints and folk icons ==
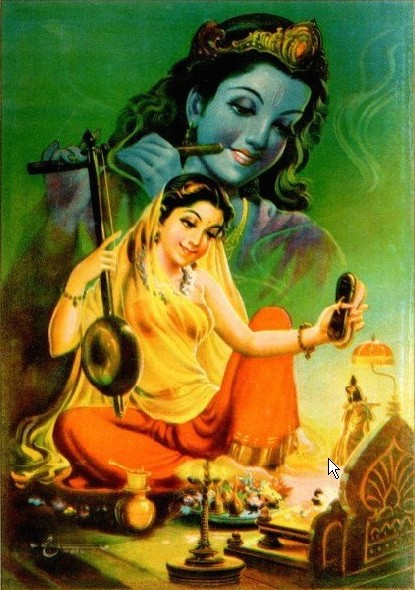
Painting of Saint Mirabai

- Mirabai, a princess and celebrated saint of the Bhakti movement and a devotee of Lord Krishna.
- Baba Ramdev or Ramdeo Pir, a 14th-century Tanwar (Tomar) ruler and Hindu deity of Gujarat and Rajasthan who worked for the upliftment of poor and downtrodden; also worshiped by Muslims.
- Gogaji, also known as Jaharveer Chauhan, an Indian warrior-hero, venerated as a saint and protector specifically against snake bites.
- Pabuji, a Hindu folk-deity of Rajasthan, immortalised in regional epic traditions and traditional performing arts such as Pabuji Ki Phad.
- Guru Jambheshwar, aka Jambhoji Panwar, the founder of Bishnoi panth which emphasises on protecting plants and animals.
- Dulla Bhatti, a Punjabi folk hero of Bhatti clan who led revolt against Akbar, the winter festival of Lohri is celebrated in remembrance of his legendary heroics.
- Om Banna, a modern Rajasthani folk deity whose Royal Enfield shrine is venerated by travellers for protection.
- Vachharadada, aka Vachhraj Dada Solanki, Hindu deity from Gujarat who died protecting cows.
- Rawal Mallinath, a 14th-century ruler and revered folk hero of Rajasthan, whose enduring legacy gave the Malani region its name.
- Pipaji, renounced his throne to become a disciple of the saint Ramananda, is revered as one of the fifteen Bhagats whose hymns are included in the Guru Granth Sahib.

== Historical figures ==
List of notable Rajputs during the pre-British era, ordered chronologically by reign.

=== Hindu Rajputs ===
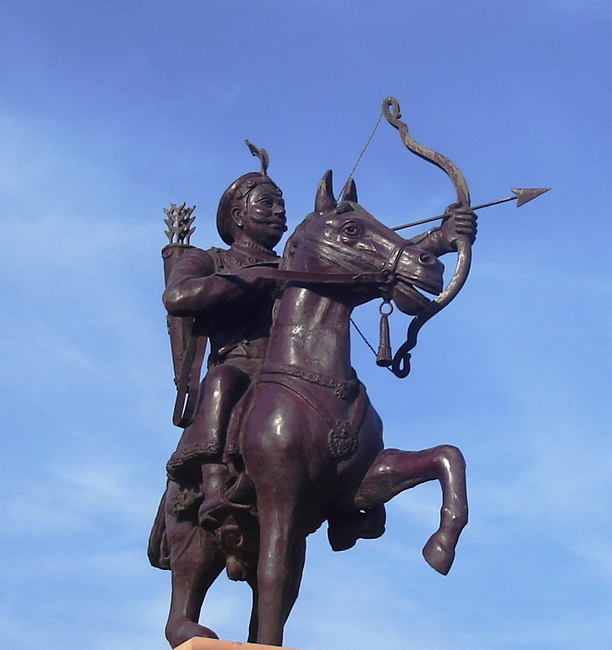
Prithviraj Chauhan, King of Ajmer

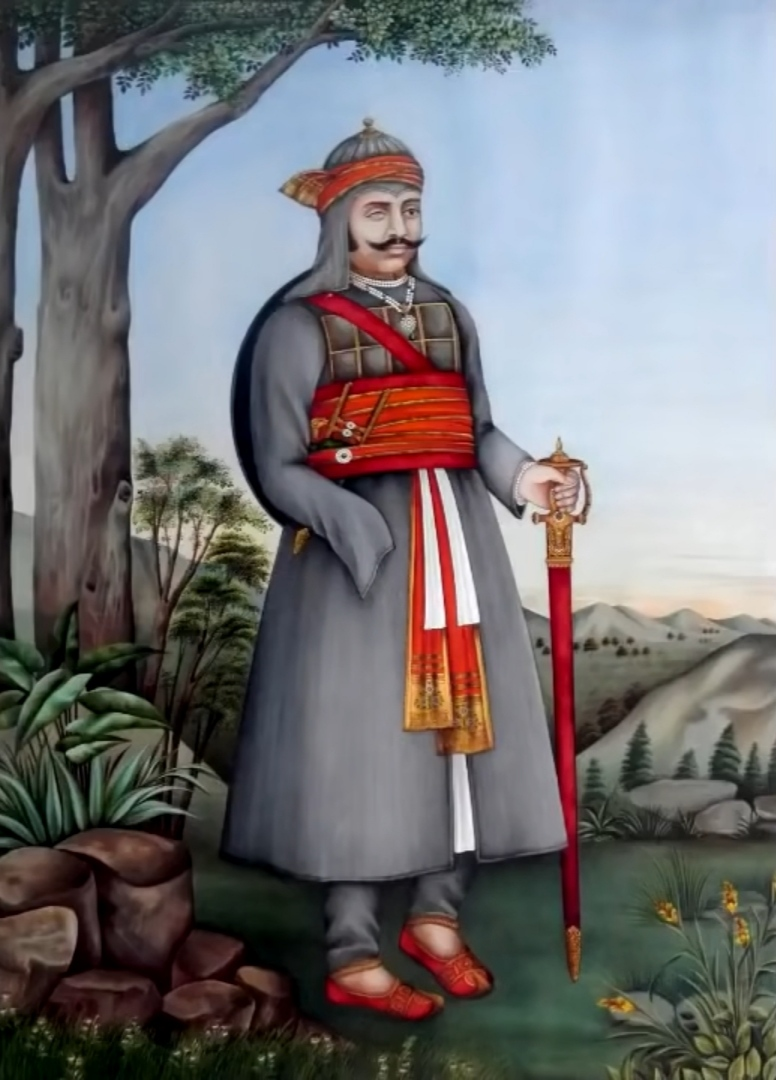
Rana Sanga, king of Mewar

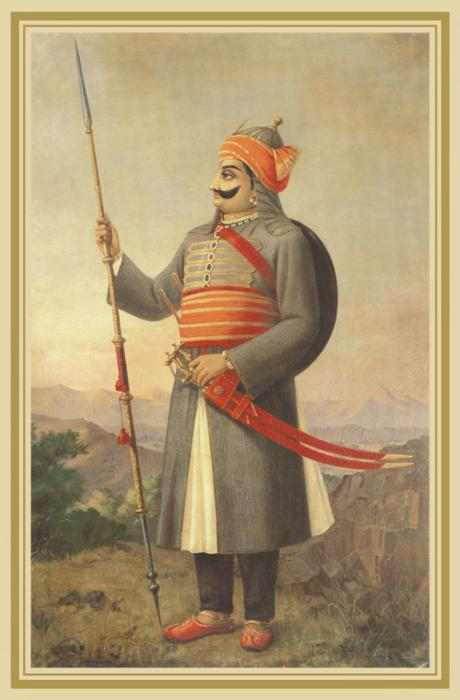
Maharana Pratap of Mewar, by Raja Ravi Varma

- King Porus, an ancient king whose territory spanned between the Jhelum River and Chenab River in the Punjab region of India and Pakistan.
- Rao Bhati, ancestor of the royal families of the Phulkian dynasty: Patiala, Nabha, Jind, and Faridkot
- Nagabhata I, founder of the Pratihara dynasty
- Bappa Rawal, one of the first major rulers of the Kingdom of Mewar, credited for rebelling the Arab invasion of India.
- Mularaja, founder of the Chaulukya (Solanki) dynasty
- Jayapala, a ruler of the Hindu Shahi Dynasty from 964 to 1001
- Vidyadhara, a Chandela king who ruled the Jejakabhukti region (Bundelkhand, Madhya Pradesh) and fought against the Ghaznavids
- Bhima I, was a Chaulukya king who ruled parts of present-day Gujarat, India
- Suhaldev Bais, ruler who defeated and killed the Ghaznavid general Ghazi Saiyyad Salar Masud
- Jayasimha Siddharaja, Indian king who ruled western parts of India
- Kumarapala, was an Indian king from the Chaulukya (Solanki) dynasty of Gujarat
- Ajayapala, was an Indian king from the Chaulukya (Solanki) dynasty of Gujarat
- Mularaja II, Ruler of the Solanki dynasty of Gujarat, who defeated the Ghurid forces.
- Prithviraj Chauhan, King from the Chahamana dynasty who ruled Sapadalaksha (present-day north-western India)
- Jaichand, last powerful king of the Gahadavala dynasty, was killed in the Battle of Chandawar by Ghurid forces.
- Bhima II, Indian king who ruled parts of present-day Gujarat
- Karna, last ruler of the Vaghela dynasty of Gujarat as he was defeated by the forces of Allauddin Khilji.
- Hammiradeva, last ruler of the Ranthambore branch of the Chauhans (Chahamanas), was killed in the Siege of Ranthambore.
- Rawal Ratan Singh, King of Mewar who fought against Allauddin Khilji in the siege of Chittorgarh
- Maharana Hammir Singh, defeated the Tughlaq dynasty, and re-captured present-day Rajasthan from Muslim forces of Delhi and became the first of his dynasty to use the royal title 'Rana'
- Maharaja Kam Dev Misir, a Sikarwar Rajput and a ruler of the Pahargarh Estate.
- Maharana Kumbha, a Sisodia ruler of the Kingdom of Mewar, who is said to have fought total 56 battles and never lost in any battle
- Maharao Shekhaji, a 15th century Shekhawat ruler who rules the Shekhawati region, comprising the districts of Sikar, Churu and Jhunjhunu, Rajasthan
- Man Singh Tomar, King of Gwalior, who defended his kingdom for nearly two decades against relentless attacks from the Lodi dynasty
- Rana Sanga, King of Mewar and head of Rajput confederacy in Rajputana during the early 16th century
- Maldev Rathore, King of Marwar was an insurgent ruler against both the Sur Empire and the Mughals
- Chandrasen Rathore, King of Marwar who defended his kingdom for nearly two decades against relentless attacks from the Mughals
- Maharana Pratap, king of Mewar who was a successful insurgent ruler against the Mughals
- Ramshah Tanwar, a Tomar ruler who fought as an ally of Maharana Pratap along with his three sons, grandson and 300 soldiers against Mughal ruler Akbar in the Battle of Haldighati
- Maharana Amar Singh I, King of Mewar, he was the eldest son of Maharana Pratap who continued his father's struggle against the Mughals and defeated the Mughal army sent by Jahangir in the Battle of Dewar
- Raja Jagat Singh, King and soldier of the Nurpur kingdom of Nurpur, in Himachal Pradesh.
- Jai Singh I, King of Amber, a state later known as Jaipur, and a senior general ("Mirza Raja") of the Mughal Empire
- Amar Singh Rathore, ruler who killed the Wazir of Mughal Emperor Shah Jahan, Salabat Khan
- Rani Karnavati of Garhwal, the Parmar Rajput Queen of Garhwal, credited for defending the kingdom against the Mughal emperor Shah Jahan.
- Ratan Singh Rathore, founder of Ratlam kingdom.
- Rao Raja Chattar Sal, King of Bundi, he served Shah Jahan as head of his Hada Rajput troops, he was trusted by Dara Shikoh with governorship of Delhi, for whom he died fighting in the War of Succession against Aurangzeb in 1658
- Maharaja Jaswant Singh, King of Marwar, he was a trusted general of the Mughal emperor Shah Jahan
- Bhim Chand was the Rajput King of Bilaspur state (reigned 1665 – 1692)
- Maharaja Chhatrasal, King of Bundelkhand, who led a successful rebellion against the Mughals and established his own independent kingdom
- Babu Himmat Sah, the founder and the first Bandhalgoti ruler of Kohra (estate) of Oudh, British India (now in Amethi district, Uttar Pradesh, India)
- Raja Sawai Pratap Singh, founder king of Alwar State. He belonged to the Naruka clan
- Sansar Chand, a Katoch King of Kangra, patron of Kangra paintings

==== City founders ====
- Bhoja Parmar, ruler of the Paramara Dynasty of Malwa, established Bhojpal (Bhopal) and constructed the Bhojtal lake
- Karna, King from the Chaulukya dynasty of Gujarat and founder of Karnavati (Ahmedabad)
- Anangpal Tomar, ruler of the Tomar dynasty of Delhi, founder Dhillikapuri (Delhi) and built the first fortress, Lal Kot.
- Ajayaraja II, founded Ajmer and built the strategic Taragarh Fort.
- Rawal Jaisal, founder and first ruler of the Kingdom of Jaisalmer (Jaisalmer), built the Jaisalmer Fort
- Rao Jodha, King of Marwar and founder of its capital city Jodhpur
- Rao Bika, founder and king of Bikaner State (Bikaner), son of Rao Jodha who left Marwar to create his own kingdom
- Rudra Pratap Singh, first ruler and founder of Orchha kingdom (Orchha).
- Jam Rawal, King of Cutch State and founder of Nawanagar State (Jamnagar).
- Rana Udai Singh II, King of Mewar and founder of its capital city Udaipur
- Kishan Singh, founded the independent state of Kishangarh (Kishangarh), later famous for its miniature paintings.
- Vir Singh Deo, King of Orchha and founder of Datia
- Maharana Raj Singh I, King of Mewar, founded Rajsamand and its lake as a famine relief project
- Dowlat Singh, founded Sikar in 1687, establishing it as a major hub of the Shekhawati region.
- Jai Singh II, King of Amber and founder of its capital city Jaipur, first planned city designed on Vastu Shastra principles

==== Legendary warriors ====
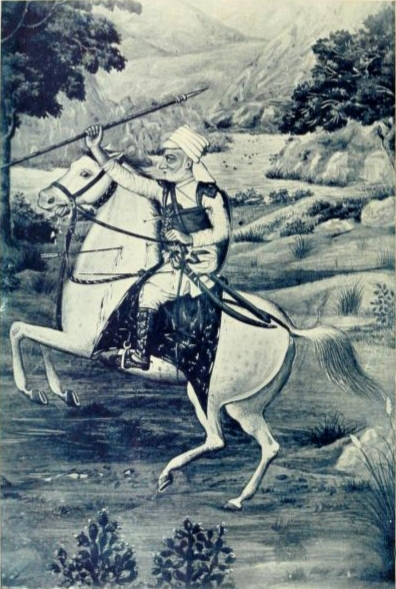
Durgadas Rathore, by Har Bilas Sarda

- Dhir Singh Pundir, a Commander in chief of Chahamana Emperor Prithviraj Chauhan
- Alha and Udal, the Banaphar Rajput generals of Chandela king Parmardi-deva or Parmal of Mahoba.
- Gora Singh and Badal Singh, two warriors from Mewar, a famous folk tale of them is about Gora Singh who is said to have fought even after his head was severed, a testament to the legendary Rajput valour
- Gajpati Ujjainia, commander in the army of the Sur Empire and chieftain in the Bhojpuri region of Bihar
- Jaimal Rathore and Patta Sisodia, two 16th-century Rajput warriors who defended the Chittorgarh Fort against the Mughal emperor Akbar's forces.
- Jhala Maan Singh, a military general of Maharana Pratap, fought in the Battle of Haldighati
- Durgadas Rathore, was a minister of Marwar who was successful in preserving Marwar against Mughal rule
- Mian Dido Jamwal, a Dogra Rajput warrior from the Jamwal clan who rebelled against the overlords of Jammu during the Sikh Empire of Ranjit Singh.
- Zorawar Singh Kahluria, Kalhuria Rajput who conquered Ladakh, Baltistan, Gilgit and Western Tibet

=== Sikh Rajputs ===
- Alam Singh Nachna, a warrior in Guru Gobind Singh’s army and was a Rajput turned Sikh
- Bhai Mani Singh, a Sikh scholar and martyr
- Bhai Bachittar Singh, a Sikh general, known with the title of Shaheed (martyr)
- Bhai Uda Singh, a Sikh warrior during the period of Guru Gobind Singh
- Bhagwant Singh Bangeshwar, engaged in a battle with a Mughal commander named Kamal Khan of Attock Fort.
- Banda Singh Bahadur, was a Sikh military commander of Khalsa army who assembled a fighting force and led the rebellion against the Mughals to establish Khalsa rule in Punjab
- Baba Baj Singh, Sikh general, scholar and martyr

=== Muslim Rajputs ===
- Rai Bhoe Bhatti, Founder of Nankana Sahib.
- Rai Bular Bhatti, a Muslim Rajput who donated 18,750 acres of land to Guru Nanak
- Hasan Khan Mewati, Ruler of Mewat, he allied with Rana Sanga in the Battle of Khanwa
- Isa Khan, a Muslim Rajput chieftain who led the Baro Bhuiyans (twelve landlords) in 16th-century Bengal, throughout his reign he resisted the Mughal attacks
- Malik Fateh Khan Tiwana, a Punjabi Muslim Rajput landowner and politician during the Sikh Empire.

== Anti-colonialists ==
=== Company rule ===
- Raja Narain Singh, Zamindar of the Seris and Kutumba estate who participated in the 1781 revolt in Bihar.

=== Mutineers and rebels, Indian rebellion of 1857 ===
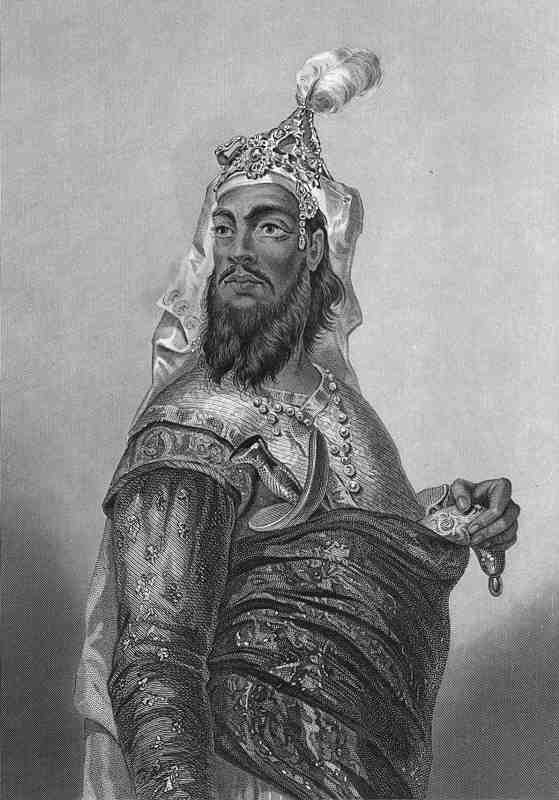
An illustration of Veer Kunwar Singh in The History of the Indian Empire, c. 1858

- Kunwar Singh, ruler of Jagdishpur estate and the chief military organiser in the Indian rebellion of 1857 against British rule.
- Babu Amar Singh, prominent leader who assumed command of rebel forces in Bihar following the death of his brother, Kunwar Singh.
- Hare Krishna Singh, commander and chief of Kunwar Singh's rebel forces.
- Hanumant Singh, influential Taluqdar of the Kalakankar estate who raised a battalion and served as a key revolutionary leader.
- Jodha Singh Ataiya, Zamindar from Fatehpur, engaged in guerrilla warfare against the British and was martyred in the Bawani Imli massacre.
- Babu Bhoop Singh, ruler of Kohra estate and a prominent leader in the rebellion.
- Raja Lal Madho Singh, ruler of Amethi estate, who was an arch rebel and a prominent leader from the beginning of the Indian rebellion of 1857.
- Bandhu Singh, rebel leader of Dumari estate.
- Kushal Singh, Thakur of Auwa who defeated British Army under General Lawrence during Indian rebellion of 1857.
- Lal Pratap Singh, Rajkumar of Kalakankar estate and a prominent leader in the rebellion.
- Meghar Singh Sakarwar, Zamindar of Gahmar. who participated by supporting rebel soldiers under Babu Amar Singh.
- Ram Baksh Singh, Zamindar of Daundia Khera estate who participated in the rebellion.
- Rana Beni Madho, ruler of Shankarpur estate and a key rebel leader in Oudh.
- Rana Ratan Singh, rebel leader affiliated with the Sodhas of Umerkot

=== British Raj ===
- Sardarsinhji Ravaji Rana, was an Indian independence activist, founding member of the Paris Indian Society and the vice-president of the Indian Home Rule Society.
- Rao Gopal Singh Kharwa, erstwhile ruler of Kharwa state, was jailed for organising revolt against the British
- Anugrah Narayan Sinha, known as Bihar Vibhuti, was an Indian nationalist statesman, participant in Champaran Satyagraha, Gandhian and one of the architects of modern Bihar, who also served as the first Deputy Chief Minister of Bihar
- Bijoy Prasad Singh Roy, was an Indian lawyer and politician. A prominent figure during the Indian independence movement, he had served as the President of the Indian National Liberation Foundation (Indian Liberal Party).
- Thakur Roshan Singh, was an Indian revolutionary and a member of Hindustan Socialist Republican Association
- Ram Prasad Bismil, was an Indian poet, writer, and revolutionary who fought against British Raj, participating in the Mainpuri Conspiracy of 1918, and the Kakori Conspiracy of 1925.
- Mahavir Singh Rathore, revolutionary freedom fighter; member of Naujawan Bharat Sabha who helped Bhagat Singh escape from the British.
- Habib-ur-Rahman, officer of the Azad Hind Fauj patriots army in the Second War of Independence during World War II against the British Raj Empire (Note: He was of Chibhal Royalty)

== Rulers of princely states ==
List of notable Rajputs during the British era who hailed from royal families that ruled princely states, Thikanas, and Zamindars.

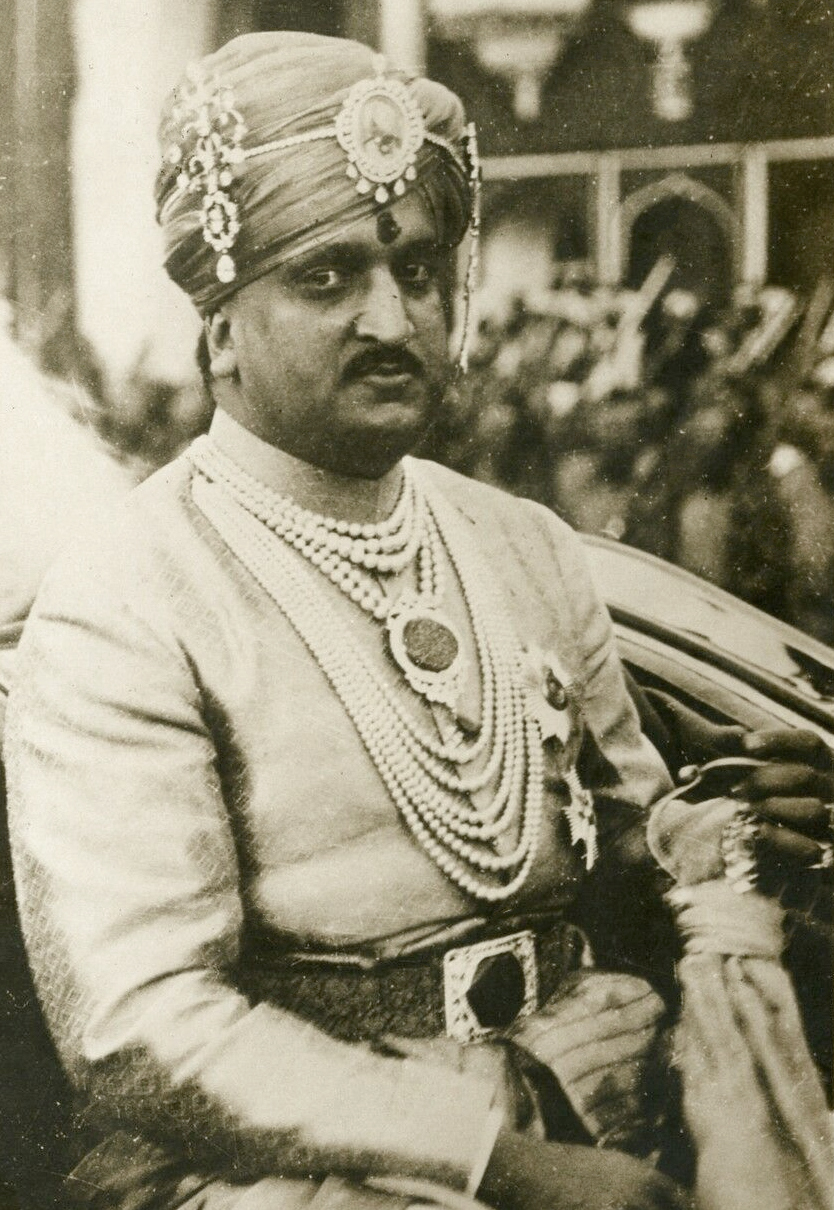
Maharaja Hari Singh, the last Maharaja of Jammu and Kashmir, hailed from the Dogra Dynasty of Rajputs

- Maharaja Ganga Singh of Bikaner, a modern reformist visionary. He was also the only non-White member of the British Imperial War Cabinet during World War I.
- Pratap Singh of Jammu and Kashmir, Maharaja of Jammu and Kashmir
- Maharaja Hari Singh, the last ruler of Jammu and Kashmir
- Khengarji III, Maharaja of Kutch.
- Takht Singh, Maharaja of Jodhpur.
- Jaswant Singh II, Maharaja of Jodhpur.
- Sardar Singh of Jodhpur, Maharaja of Jodhpur.
- Fateh Singh of Udaipur and Mewar, Maharaja of Udaipur.
- Bhupal Singh, Maharaja of Udaipur.
- Madho Singh II, Maharaja of Jaipur.
- Man Singh II, Maharaja of Jaipur.
- Pragmalji II, Maharaja of Kutch.
- Umaid Singh, Maharaja of Jodhpur.
- Hanwant Singh, last Maharaja of Jodhpur.
- Jai Singh Prabhakar, Maharaja of Alwar.
- Amarsinhji Banesinhji, last Maharaja of Wankaner.
- Umed Singh II, Maharaja of Kota.
- Bhim Singh II, Maharaja of Kota.
- Raja Rajendra Singh, Raja of Baghal from 1946 until 1971.
- Sita Devi (Maharani of Kapurthala), born to the royal family of Kashipur
- Natwarsinhji Bhavsinhji the Maharja of Porbandar State from Jethwa dynasty

== British Indian military people ==
- Major General Sajjan Singh of Ratlam, British Indian officer who served in World War I, Third Afghan War. He was the Maharaja of Ratlam.
- Major General Thakur Mahadeo Singh, first Indian Commandant of the Indian Military Academy.
- Brigadier Hanut Singh, British Indian officer, son of Pratap Singh of Idar, served in World War I.
- Col Thakur Hari Singh Shekhawat, British Indian officer who served in Second Afghan War, Tirah campaign.
- Col Bahadur Singh of Bundi, Maharao Raja of Bundi, awarded the Military Cross during the Burma campaign
- Col Pratap Singh of Idar, was a decorated British Indian Army officer who served in Second Afghan War, Tirah campaign, Boxer Rebellion, First World War. He was the Maharaja of Idar and administrator and Regent of Jodhpur.
- Lt Col Raghbir Singh Pathania, British Indian officer who served and was killed in World War I
- Major Dalpat Singh, son of Thakur Hari Singh Shekhawat, was a British Indian officer, known as the "Hero of Haifa" for his actions in the Battle of Haifa during World War I.
- Jemadar Prakash Singh Chib, awarded Victoria Cross during the Burma campaign
- Jemadar Rao Abdul Hafiz, awarded Victoria Cross for the Battle of Imphal
- Jemadar Lala Ram, awarded Victoria Cross for the Battle of Hanna
- Jemadar Gobind Singh, awarded Victoria Cross for the Battle of Cambrai
- Subedar Darwan Singh Negi, awarded Victoria Cross for the Defence of Festubert
- Subedar Ram Sarup Singh, awarded Victoria Cross during the Burma campaign
- Havildar Chatta Singh, awarded Victoria Cross for the Battle of Wadi
- Naik Kirpa Ram, awarded George Cross for supreme self-sacrifice by absorbing the blast of a misfired rifle grenade.
- Rifleman Gabar Singh Negi, awarded Victoria Cross for the Battle of Neuve-Chapelle

== Politicians of post colonial India ==
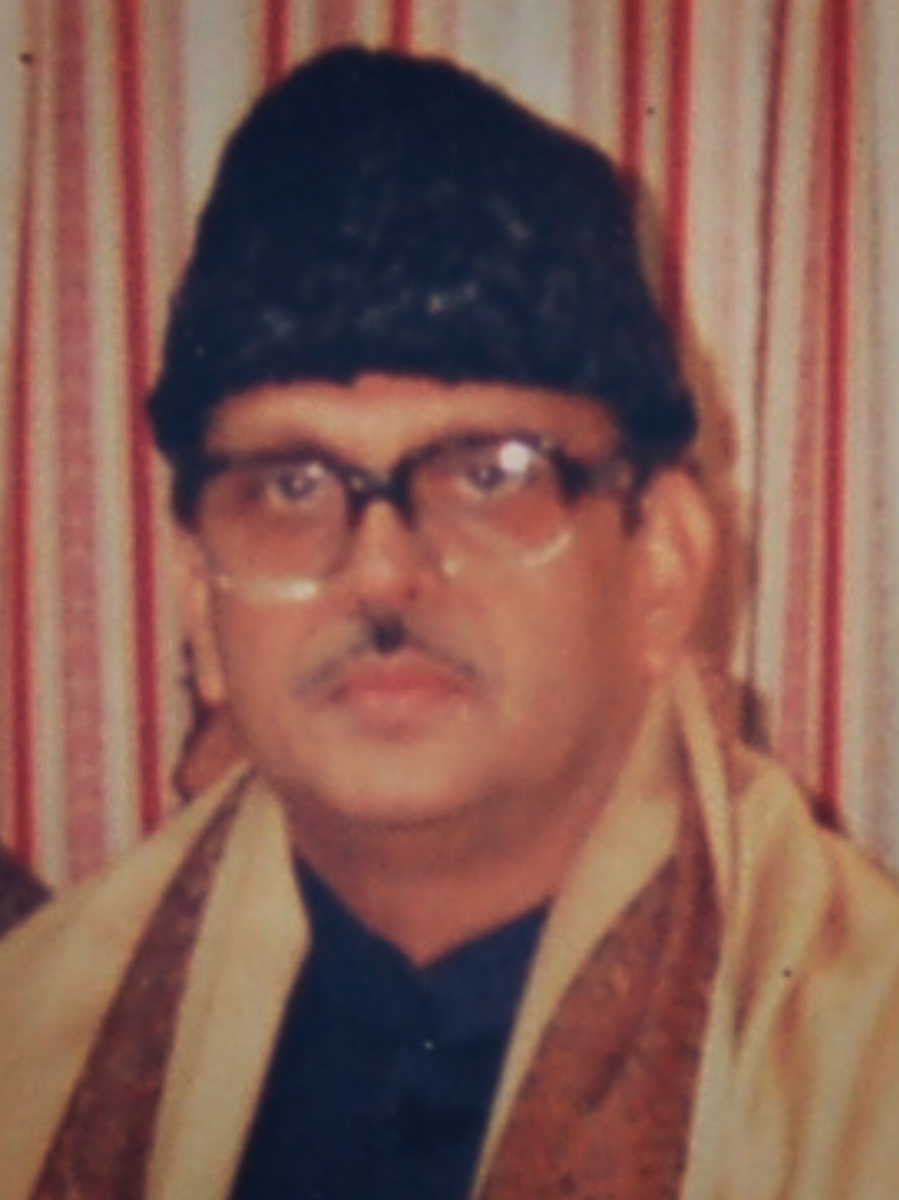
V.P. Singh, former Indian Prime Minister

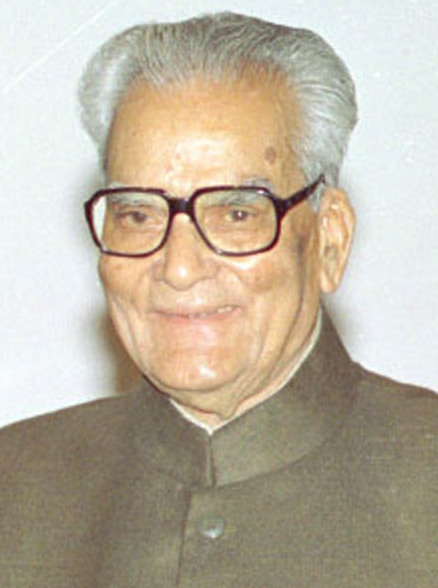
Bhairon Singh Shekhawat, former vice-president of India

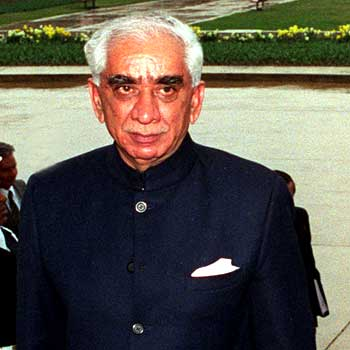
Jaswant Singh

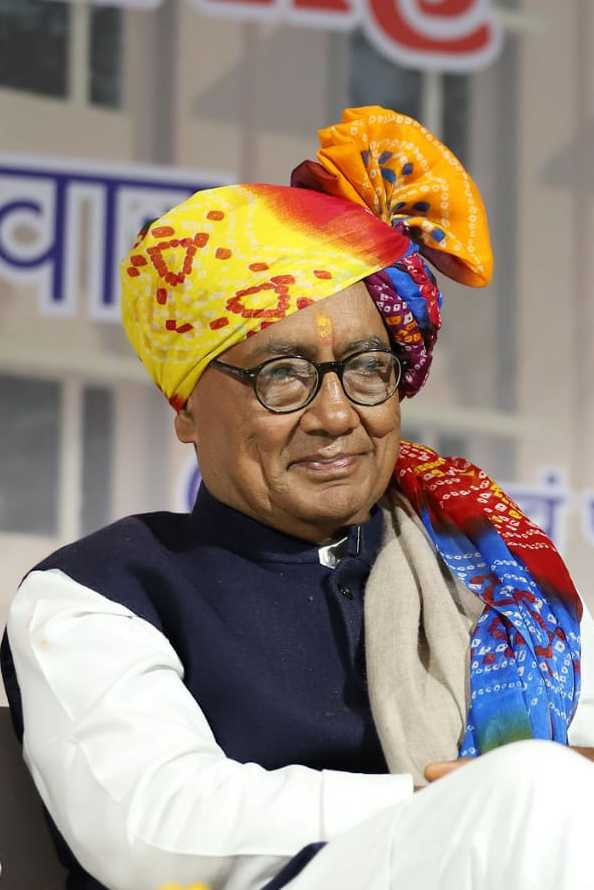
Digvijaya Singh, veteran politician of the Congress party

=== Vice-presidents ===
- Bhairon Singh Shekhawat, 11th Vice-President of India, former Chief minister of Rajasthan

=== Prime ministers ===
- V. P. Singh, former Prime Minister of India (1989–1990) and former Chief Minister of Uttar Pradesh.
- Chandra Shekhar, former Prime Minister of India (1990–1991)

=== Cabinet ministers ===
- Jaswant Singh, former Minister of Defence and External Affairs
- Dinesh Singh, former Minister of External Affairs
- Dilip Singh Judeo, former Minister of Environment and Forests
- Kalyan Singh Kalvi, former Minister of Energy
- Rajiv Pratap Rudy, former Minister of Civil Aviation
- R. K. Singh, former Minister of Power
- Satya Narayan Sinha, former Minister of Health and Information and Broadcasting
- Narendra Singh Tomar, former Minister of Agriculture & Farmers Welfare
- Jitendra Singh Rana, Minister of State (I/C) Science and Technology
- Raghuvansh Prasad Singh, former Minister of State (I/C) Food and Animal Husbandry
- Digvijay Singh, former Minister of State for External Affairs

=== State politicians ===
- Yashwant Singh Parmar, former Chief Minister and widely considered the maker of modern Himachal Pradesh
- Chandrashekhar Singh, former Chief minister of Bihar
- Satyendra Narayan Sinha, former Chief minister of Bihar
- Harihar Singh, former Chief minister of Bihar
- Deep Narayan Singh, former Chief minister of Bihar
- Atishi Marlena, former Chief minister of Delhi
- Thakur Ram Lal, former Chief minister of Himachal Pradesh
- Virbhadra Singh, former Chief minister of Himachal Pradesh
- Dharam Singh, former Chief minister of Karnataka
- Arjun Singh, former Chief minister of Madhya Pradesh
- Digvijaya Singh, former Chief minister of Madhya Pradesh
- Govind Narayan Singh, former Chief minister of Madhya Pradesh, former governor of Bihar
- Rajendra Narayan Singh Deo, former Chief minister of Odisha
- Harish Rawat, former Chief minister of Uttarakhand
- Yogi Adityanath, current Chief minister of Uttar Pradesh
- Vir Bahadur Singh, former Chief minister of Uttar Pradesh
- Tribhuvan Narain Singh, former Chief minister of Uttar Pradesh
- Manish Sisodia, former Deputy Chief Minister of Delhi
- Bhishma Narain Singh, former governors of Assam and Tamil Nadu
- Ram Dulari Sinha, former governor of Bihar
- Karan Singh, former governor of Jammu and Kashmir

=== Members of parliament ===
==== Lok Sabha ====
- Lovely Anand, Lok Sabha MP from Sheohar
- Nawab Singh Chauhan, former Lok Sabha MP from Aligarh
- Indra Kumari, former Lok Sabha MP from Aligarh
- Mohar Singh Rathore, former Lok Sabha MP from Churu
- Kishori Sinha, former Lok Sabha MP from Vaishali
- Anand Singh, former Lok Sabha MP from Gonda
- Bhim Singh, former Lok Sabha MP from Udhampur, founder of JKNPP
- Dhananjay Singh, former Lok Sabha MP from Jaunpur
- Satya Deo Singh, former Lok Sabha MP from Balrampur, former BJYM president
- Shiv Kumar Shastri, former Lok Sabha MP from Aligarh
- Tan Singh, former Lok Sabha MP from Barmer; founder of Shri Kshatriya Yuvak Sangh
- Ugrasen Singh, former Lok Sabha MP from Deoria
- Uma Shankar Singh, former Lok Sabha MP from Maharajganj (Bihar)

==== Rajya Sabha ====
- Amar Singh, former Rajya Sabha MP from Uttar Pradesh
- Gaj Singh, former Rajya Sabha MP from Rajasthan; titular Maharaja of Jodhpur

=== Others ===
- Devisingh Ransingh Shekhawat, former First Gentleman of India
- Ravindra Singh Bhati, MLA Sheo, Rajasthan
- Rivaba Jadeja, MLA Jamnagar North, minister in Gujarat
- Pratap Singh Khachariyawas, former MLA Civil Lines and minister in Rajasthan
- Sher Singh Rana, founder of Rashtravadi Janlok Party

== Indian armed forces ==
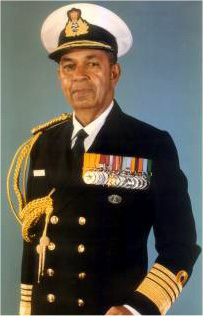
Madhvendra Singh, former Chief of Indian Navy

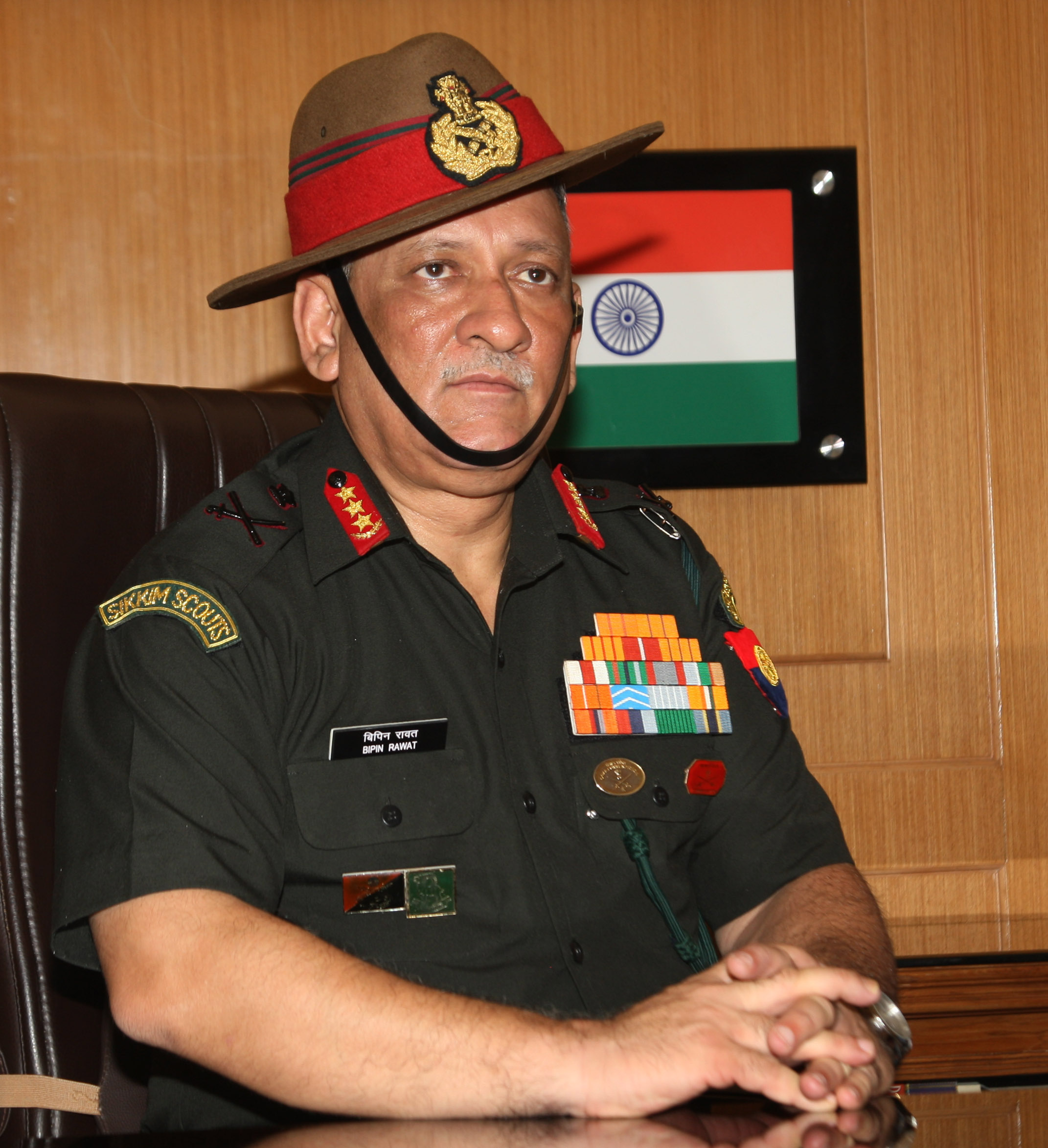
Bipin Rawat, former Chief of Army Staff of the Indian Army

- General Anil Chauhan, 2nd Chief of Defence Staff (CDS) of the Indian Armed Forces
- General Bipin Rawat, 1st Chief of Defence Staff (CDS) of India and former Chief of the Army Staff
- General Rajendrasinhji Jadeja, first Chief of the Army Staff
- General V.K. Singh, Indian politician and former Chief of the Army Staff
- Admiral Madhvendra Singh, former Chief of the Naval Staff
- Lt Gen Hanut Singh Rathore, awarded the Maha Vir Chakra for the Battle of Basantar
- Lt Gen Nathu Singh Rathore, served the Indian Army from 1947 to 1954, was offered Commander-in-Chief of army post but he declined, stating that General K. M. Cariappa was senior to him and more eligible for the post.
- Lt Gen Lakshman Singh Rawat, former Deputy Chief of the Army
- Lt Gen Kashmir Singh Katoch, Indian general during the 1947 war
- Lt Gen Bikram Singh, GOC Chinar Corps
- Lt Gen Kanwar Bahadur Singh, served the Indian Army from 1931 to 1959
- Lt Gen Sagat Singh, awarded the Padma Bhushan
- Air Marshal Prithi Singh, former AOC-in-C of the Western Air Command
- Maj Gen Anant Singh Pathania, a recipient of Maha Vir Chakra and the first Indian to receive Military Cross in the Second World War.
- Maj Gen Kanwar Zorawar Singh, awarded the Military Cross
- Air Vice Marshal Chandan Singh Rathore, awarded the Maha Vir Chakra
- Brigadier Rajinder Singh, popularly known as "Saviour of Kashmir" and India's first recipient of the Maha Vir Chakra.
- Brigadier Sawai Bhawani Singh, awarded the Maha Vir Chakra
- Brigadier Manjit Singh, awarded Maha Vir Chakra
- Brigadier Saurabh Singh Shekhawat, awarded the Kirti Chakra
- Col Brijpal Singh, awarded Vir Chakra
- Col Thakur Govind Singh, first Indian commandant of the President’s Bodyguard
- Col Karni Singh Rathore, awarded the Kirti Chakra
- Group Captain Virendera Singh Pathania, fighter pilot credited with independent India's first dogfight kill, awarded Vir Chakra
- Lt Col Megh Singh, known for creating the special forces of India, awarded Vir Chakra
- Major Shaitan Singh, awarded the Param Vir Chakra
- Capt Gurbachan Singh Salaria, awarded the Param Vir Chakra
- Capt Ummed Singh Mahra, awarded the Ashok Chakra
- Lt Kiran Shekhawat, first Indian Navy woman officer to be killed in the line of duty
- Company Havildar Major Piru Singh Shekhawat, awarded the Param Vir Chakra
- Naik Jadu Nath Singh Rathore, awarded the Param Vir Chakra

== Politicians of Pakistan ==
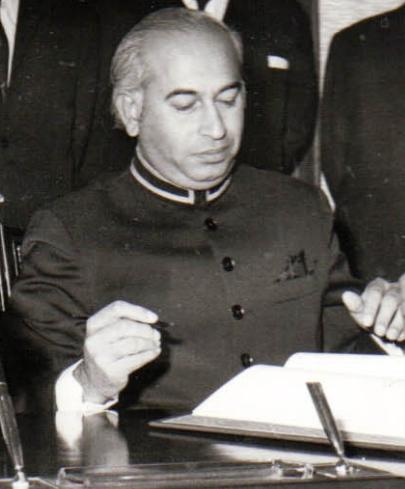
Zulfiqar Ali Bhutto, former President and Prime Minister of Pakistan

=== President ===
- Zulfikar Ali Bhutto, 4th President and the 9th Prime Minister of Pakistan

=== Prime Ministers ===
- Firoz Khan Noon, 3rd Chief Minister of Punjab, 7th Prime Minister of Pakistan
- Benazir Bhutto, 11th and 13th Prime Minister of Pakistan.
- Raja Pervez Ashraf, 17th Prime Minister of Pakistan.

=== Cabinet Ministers ===
- Chaudhary Nisar Ali Khan, 40th Interior Minister of Pakistan.
- Ahsan Iqbal, 41st Interior Minister of Pakistan, Incumbent Minister of Planning, Development and Initiatives
- Rana Sanaullah, 46th Interior Minister of Pakistan.
- Rana Tanveer Hussain, Incumbent Minister for National Food Security and Research, and Minister of Industries.

=== State Politicians ===
- Malik Khizar Hayat Tiwana, last Premier of the united Punjab.
- Raja Mumtaz Hussain Rathore, 3rd Prime Minister of Azad Kashmir.
- Sardar Sikandar Hayat, 6th Prime Minister and 15th & 16th President of Azad Kashmir
- Raja Zulqarnain Khan, 19th President of Azad Jammu and Kashmir.
- Allah Bux Soomro, former chief minister of Sindh
- Mumtaz Bhutto, 13th & 18th Chief Minister of Sindh.
- Sir Shah Nawaz Bhutto, Prime Minister of the princely state Junagarh
- Chaudhry Ghulam Abbas, former Head of the Azad Kashmir government
- Rana Chander Singh, former Federal Minister of Pakistan
- Rana Hamir Singh, former Member of Provincial Assembly of Sindh, 26th and current Rana of Umerkot, Sindh, Pakistan
- Ram Singh Sodho, former member of the Provincial Assembly of Sindh

=== Scottish Politician ===
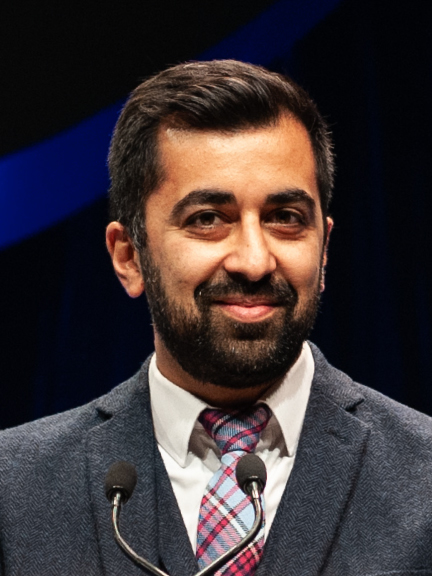
Humza Yousaf, head of the Scottish government

- Humza Yousaf, former First Minister of Scotland.

== Pakistani armed forces ==
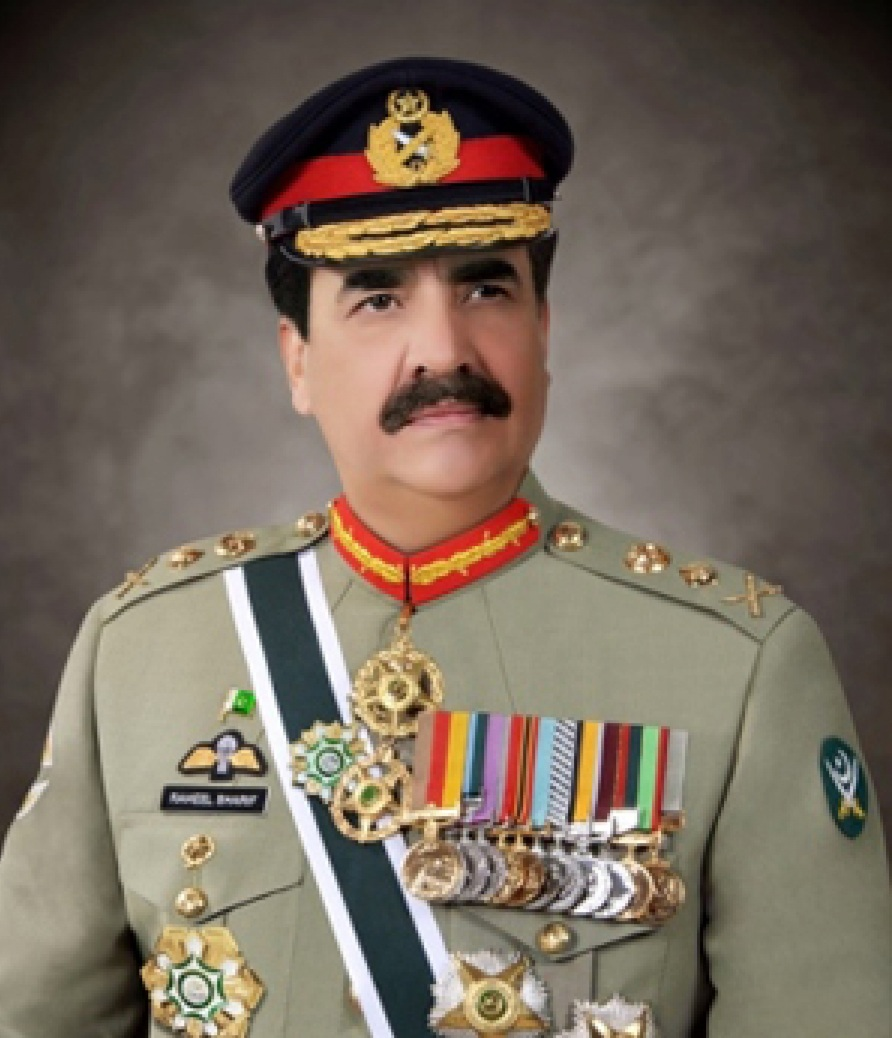
General Raheel Sharif, former Chief of Army Staff of Pakistan Army

- Major Rana Shabbir Sharif, awarded the Nishan-e-Haider
- Pilot Rashid Minhas, awarded the Nishan-e-Haider
- Major Raja Aziz Bhatti, awarded the Nishan-e-Haider
- Captain Raja Muhammad Sarwar, awarded the Nishan-e-Haider
- Saif Ali Janjua, awarded the Nishan-e-Haider.
- Raja Sakhi Daler Khan, fought for Pakistan in the 1947 Indo-Pakistan war.
- General Tikka Khan, 1st Army Chief of Pakistan
- General Asif Nawaz Janjua, 4th Army Chief of Pakistan.
- General Raheel Sharif, 9th Army Chief of Pakistan.
- Iftikhar Ali Khan, 22nd Chief of General Staff (CGS) of the Pakistan Army.
- Mujahid Anwar Khan, 15th Chief of Air Staff of the Pakistan Air Force
- Lt. General Bakhtiar Rana, Pakistan army Commander during the Battle of Chawinda in the Indo-Pakistani war of 1965.
- Rao Farman Ali, former Two-star general of Pak Army and former Minister of Petroleum.
- Major General Akbar Khan, PA-1 and first Honorary aide-de-camp to Muhammad Ali Jinnah.
- Major General Iftikhar Khan.
- Major General Iftikhar Khan Janjua, hero of the Rann of Kutch War of 1965 and Battle of Chamb in 1971.

== Film, television and entertainment ==
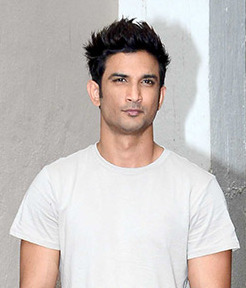
Sushant Singh Rajput

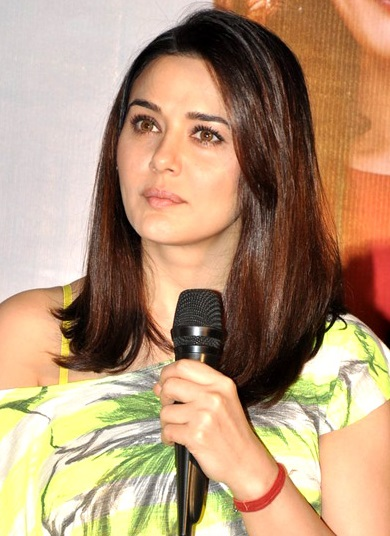
Preity Zinta

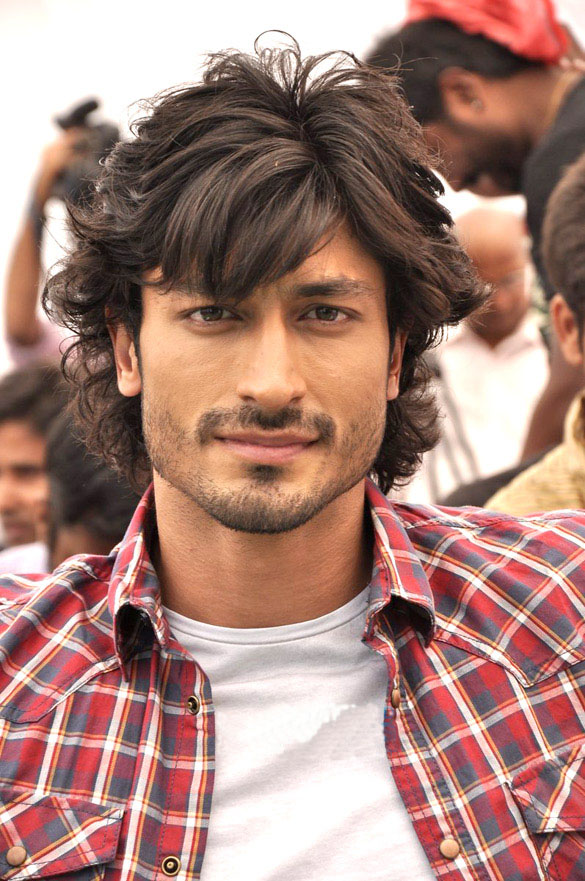
Vidyut Jammwal

- Sonarika Bhadoria, Indian TV actress
- Jaspal Bhatti, Indian film and TV actor
- Sonal Chauhan, Indian film actress and model
- Vidyut Jammwal, Indian actor
- Anurag Kashyap, Indian filmmaker
- Sara Loren, Pakistani actress
- Nakuul Mehta, Indian TV actor
- Navni Parihar, Indian TV actress
- Disha Patani, Indian actress
- Sushant Singh Rajput, former Indian TV and film actor
- Kangana Ranaut, Indian film actress
- Roopkumar Rathod, Indian playback singer
- Urvashi Rautela, Indian film actress
- Kratika Sengar, Indian TV actress
- Abhimanyu Singh, Indian actor
- Chaya Singh, Indian actress
- Mohena Singh, Indian TV actress and member of Rewa royal family
- Rituraj Singh, Indian TV actor
- D. Shankar Singh, Indian filmmaker
- Thakur Anoop Singh, Indian film and TV actor
- Vishakha Singh, Indian film actress
- Sakshi Tanwar, Indian actress
- Preity Zinta, Indian film actress

== Arts, literature, and poetry ==
- Anuja Chauhan, author and screenwriter.
- Shibli Nomani, famous Islamic scholar, poet, historian and philosopher.
- Subhadra Kumari Chauhan, poet, famous for Jhansi Ki Rani
- Lakshmi Kumari Chundawat, Rajasthani literature author
- Govardhan Kumari, dancer, popularised Ghoomar and Chari Dance
- Kripal Singh Shekhawat, craftsman and ceramist, famous for Blue Pottery of Jaipur
- Raja Ghazanfar Ali Khan, prominent All India Muslim League leader and Pakistan movement activist.
- Thakur Gadadhar Singh, author, widely considered the founder of the Hindu travel literature
- Jaideva Singh, musicologist and scholar of Kashmir Saivism, awarded Padma Bhushan
- Kedarnath Singh, poet, Jnanpith Award and Sahitya Akademi Award awardee
- Zafar Ali Khan, writer, poet and Pakistan Movement activist.
- Z. A. Suleri, Pakistani political journalist, conservative writer, author, and Pakistan Movement activist.

== Academics and scientists ==
- Hari Singh Gour, first Vice-Chancellor of the University of Delhi and Nagpur University, founder of the University of Sagar
- Fateh Singh, fellow of the Royal Geographical Society.
- Rajendra Singh Tomar, author, physics professor at the University of Allahabad, later on became the sarsanghchalak of RSS.
- Masud Khan, psychoanalyst known for the Concept of Cumulative Trauma.

== Judges, lawyers, and civil servants ==
- Iftikhar Chaudhary, 20th Chief Justice of Pakistan.
- Rana Bhagwandas, 22nd Chief Justice of Pakistan
- Zafar Ahmed Rajput, incumbent Chief Justice of Sindh.
- Nana Chudasama, Indian jurist, mayor, and sheriff of Mumbai.
- Fateh Singh Rathore, Indian Forest Service officer known for Tiger conservation and Ranthambore National Park
- Kamal Narain Singh, 22nd Chief Justice of India
- Nagendra Singh, 14th President of the International Court of Justice, 4th Chief Election Commissioner of India
- Inder Singh, Indian Police Service officer, former Inspector-general in Himachal Pradesh
- Bhuvaneshwar Prasad Sinha, 6th Chief Justice of India.

== Activists and social workers ==
- Kailash Sankhala, biologist and tiger conservationist, known as 'Tiger Man of India'
- Kamalendumati Shah, women's rights social worker, awarded Padma Bhushan
- Abha Singh, Bombay High Court lawyer, women's rights and gender equality activist
- Martand Singh, white tiger conservationist and creator of the Bandhavgarh National Park
- Rajendra Singh, water conservationist, awarded the Magsaysay Award

== Business ==
- Arvind Singh Mewar, former chairman and managing director of HRH Group of Hotels
- Lakshyaraj Singh Mewar, executive director of the HRH Group of Hotels, representing the erstwhile royal family of Udaipur

== Sports ==
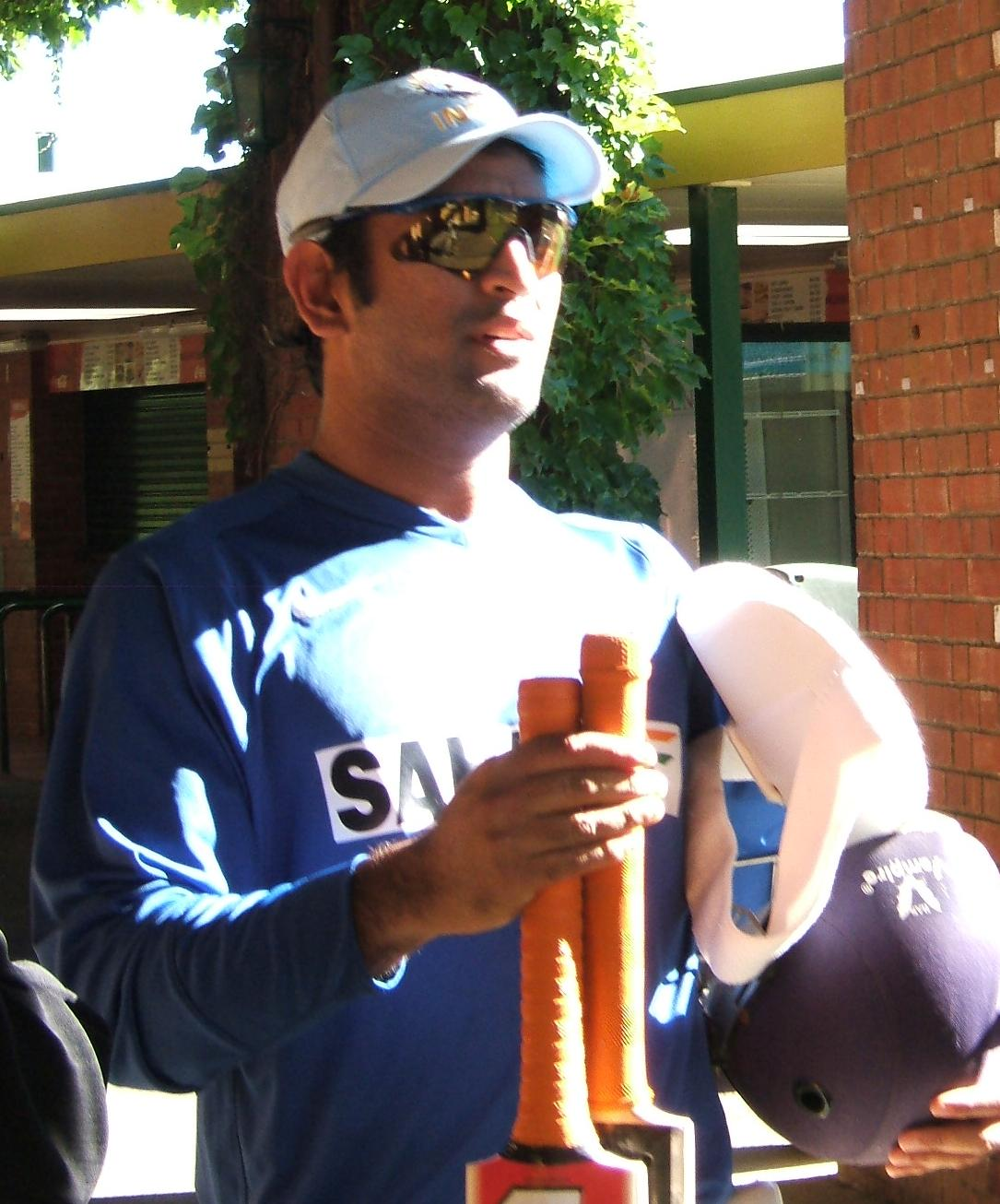
Former Indian cricketer Mahendra Singh Dhoni

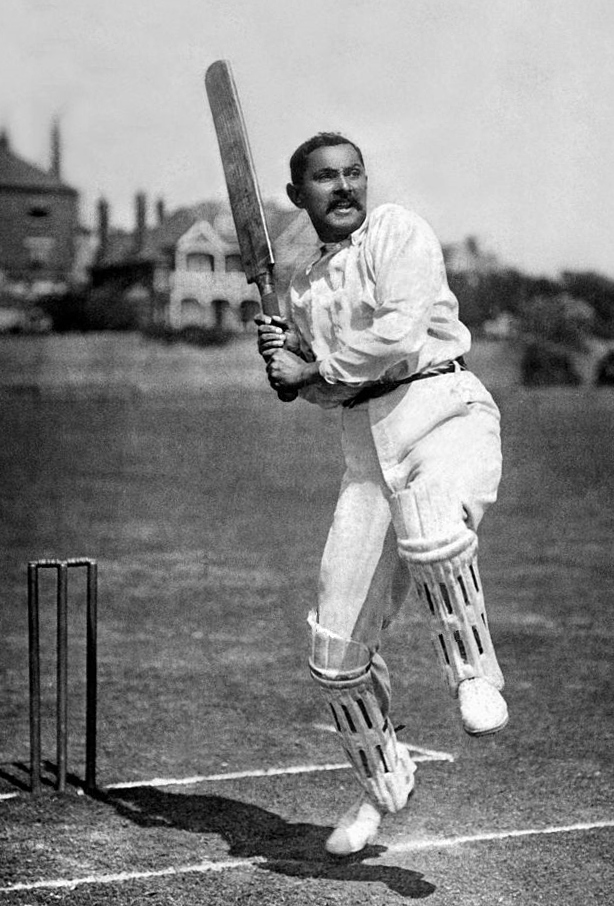
Ranjitsinhji, the Maharaja of Nawanagar, known as the "Father of Indian Cricket"

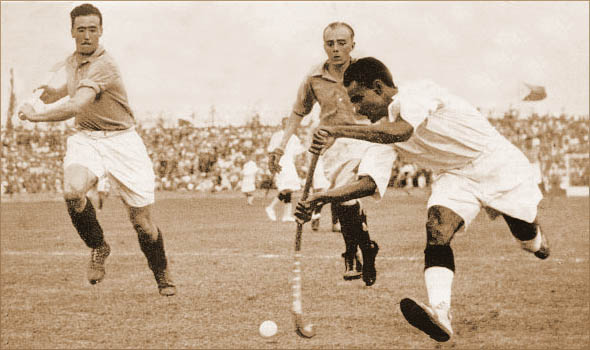
Dhyan Chand, widely regarded as the greatest field hockey player in history

=== Athletics ===
- Milkha Singh, "The Flying Sikh"; 4-time Asian Games gold medalist and former 400m National Record holder
- Hari Chand, double Asian Games gold medalist in the 5,000m and 10,000m
- Paan Singh Tomar, former steeplechase runner and National Record holder, soldier and outlaw

=== Cricket ===
- Kumar Shri Ranjitsinhji, Maharaja of Nawanagar. The Ranji Trophy is named after him.
- Duleepsinhji, the Duleep Trophy is named after him.
- Raj Singh Dungarpur, former Indian cricketer and administrator
- Hanumant Singh, former Indian Test batsman
- Chetan Chauhan, former Indian Test opener
- Mahendra Singh Dhoni, the only captain to win all 3 major ICC white-ball trophies
- Ravindra Jadeja, Indian all-rounder

=== Hockey ===
- Dhyan Chand, legendary hockey wizard who scored over 500 international goals
- Ashok Kumar, son of Dhyan Chand, 1975 World Cup winner
- Charanjit Singh, captained the Indian team to a gold medal at the 1964 Olympics
- Roop Singh, younger brother of Dhyan Chand; won 2 Olympic gold medals
- Deepak Thakur, received the Arjuna Award

=== Polo and equestrian ===
- Vijayasinhji Chhatrasinhji, winner of the first Indian derby
- Kishen Singh, received the Arjuna Award
- Prem Singh, first polo player to be received the Arjuna Award
- Brigadier V. P. Singh, highest Indian handicap of +7 goals

=== Shooting and hunting ===
- Ramanuj Pratap Singh Deo, former hunter and last ruler of Korea state
- Rajyashree Kumari, former national trap shooting champion, received the Arjuna Award
- Jaspal Rana, most successful Indian Commonwealth athlete, also received the Dronacharya Award
- Karni Singh, first shooting player to be received Arjuna Award

=== Boxing ===
- Amir Khan, former World Champion

=== Wrestling ===
- Dalip Singh Rana (popularly known as The Great Khali), WWE wrestler

== Criminals ==
- Man Singh, the leader of Indian dacoits and a Robin Hood figure from Chambal region of India. Between 1939 and 1955, he is credited with 1,112 robberies and 185 murders, including the killing of 32 police officers.
- Anandpal Singh, a most-wanted gangster with a reward of ₹10 lakh on his head, accused of multiple murders as well as extortion.
