= Rajput (disambiguation) =

Rajput is a group of kin bodies, castes and local groups. Such groups share ideology and social status of northern Indian descent.

Rajput may also refer to:

- List of Rajputs, a list of notable members of the Rajput community
- Rajput clans, Indian patrilineal clans historically associated with warriorhood
- Rajput (film), 1982 film
- Rajput Regiment, an infantry regiment of the Indian Army

== People ==
- Payal Rajput (born 1992), Indian actress
- Sushant Singh Rajput (1986–2020), Indian actor
