= Ghoomar =

Traditional folk dance of Rajasthan, India

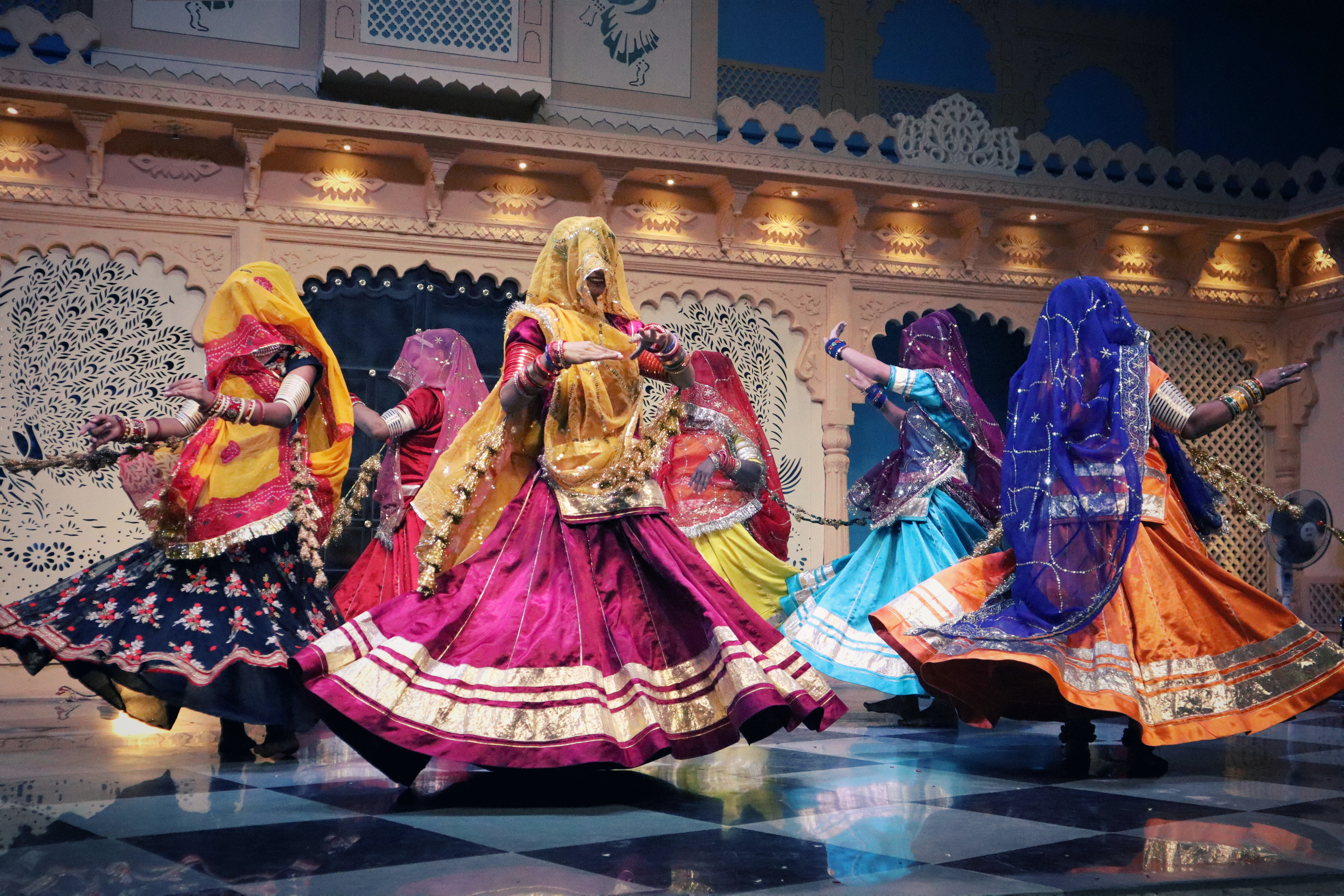
- Women performing Ghoomar
- Native name: घूमर
- Genre: Folk dance
- Instrument(s): Dhol, Sahnai
- Origin: Rajasthan, India

Ghoomar or ghumar is a traditional folk dance of Rajasthan. It was the Bhil tribe who performed it to worship Goddess Saraswati which was later embraced by Rajputs. The dance is chiefly performed by veiled women who wear flowing dresses called ghaghara. The dance typically involves performers pirouetting while moving in and out of a wide circle. The word ghoomna describes the twirling movement of the dancers and is the basis of the word ghoomar.

According to the traditional rituals, newly married bride is expected to dance ghoomar on being welcomed to her new marital home. Ghoomar is often performed on special occasions, such as at weddings, festivals and religious occasions, which sometimes lasts for hours.

== History ==
Ghoomar is of Bhil tribe performed to worship goddess Sarasvati which was later embraced by other Rajasthani communities. Bheels were a strong community at that time and were in constant war with Rajput kings. After much fighting peace was made and they began interacting with each other. Ghoomar was performed at Rajputana by local women, later on Rajput elite women also started participating in the dance. Men were not allowed at these dance performances. Ghoomar became popular in the Indian state of Rajasthan during the reigns of Rajput kings, and is typically performed by women during auspicious occasions. Women perform ghoomar with ghoonghat on their head covering their face. The dance form acquires different style and slight change in attire with the different regions of Rajasthan. Ghoomar is performed with faster beats in areas adjoining Gujarat, steps similar to garba style, while slower beats in Dhaulpur Karauli Braj kshetra, similarly difference in attire and dancing style can be seen in Udaipur, Kota, Bundi etc.

== Ghoomar Songs ==
As a traditional dance, ghoomar often includes traditional songs such as "Gorband", "Podina", "Rumal" and "Mor Bole Re". Songs might be centered on royal legends or their traditions.

- "Jaipur jao to"-Traditional Rajasthani Folk Dance
- "Chirmi Mhari Chirmali"
- "Aave Hichki" - Traditional Rajasthani Ghoomar song
- "Mhari Ghoomar Chye Nakhrali"
- "Jawai Ji Pawna" - Rajasthani folk song
- "Taara Ri Chundadi"
- "Mharo Gorband Nakhralo"
- "Naina Ra Lobhi"
- "Aur Rang De "
- "Ghoomar"
- "Surat Aap Ri Bannsa"

== Cultural impact ==
- "Gangaur Ghoomar Dance Academy" was established by Maharani Rajmata Goverdhan Kumari of Santrampur in 1986, to preserve and promote ghoomar folk dance. The Government of India awarded her the fourth highest civilian honour of the Padma Shri, in 2007, for her contributions to arts.
- The 2017 Bollywood film Padmaavat featured a popular song titled "Ghoomar" that showcased this traditional folk dance.

== Gallery ==
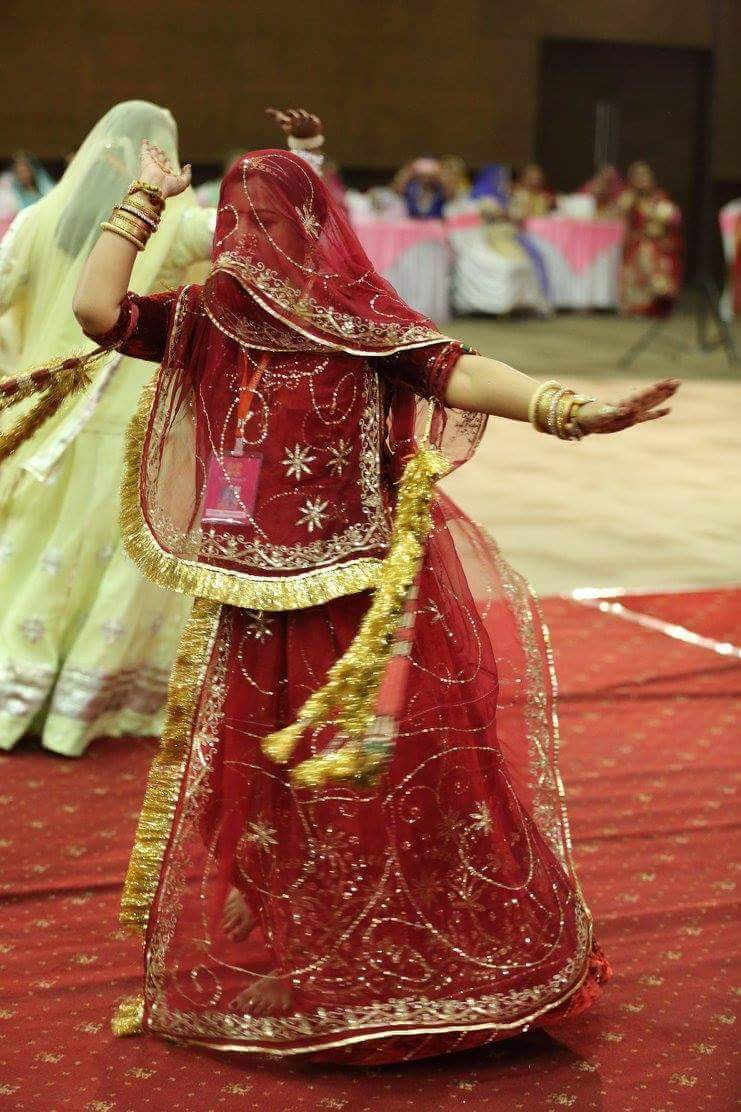
A Rajput woman performing ghoomar in Rajputi poshak

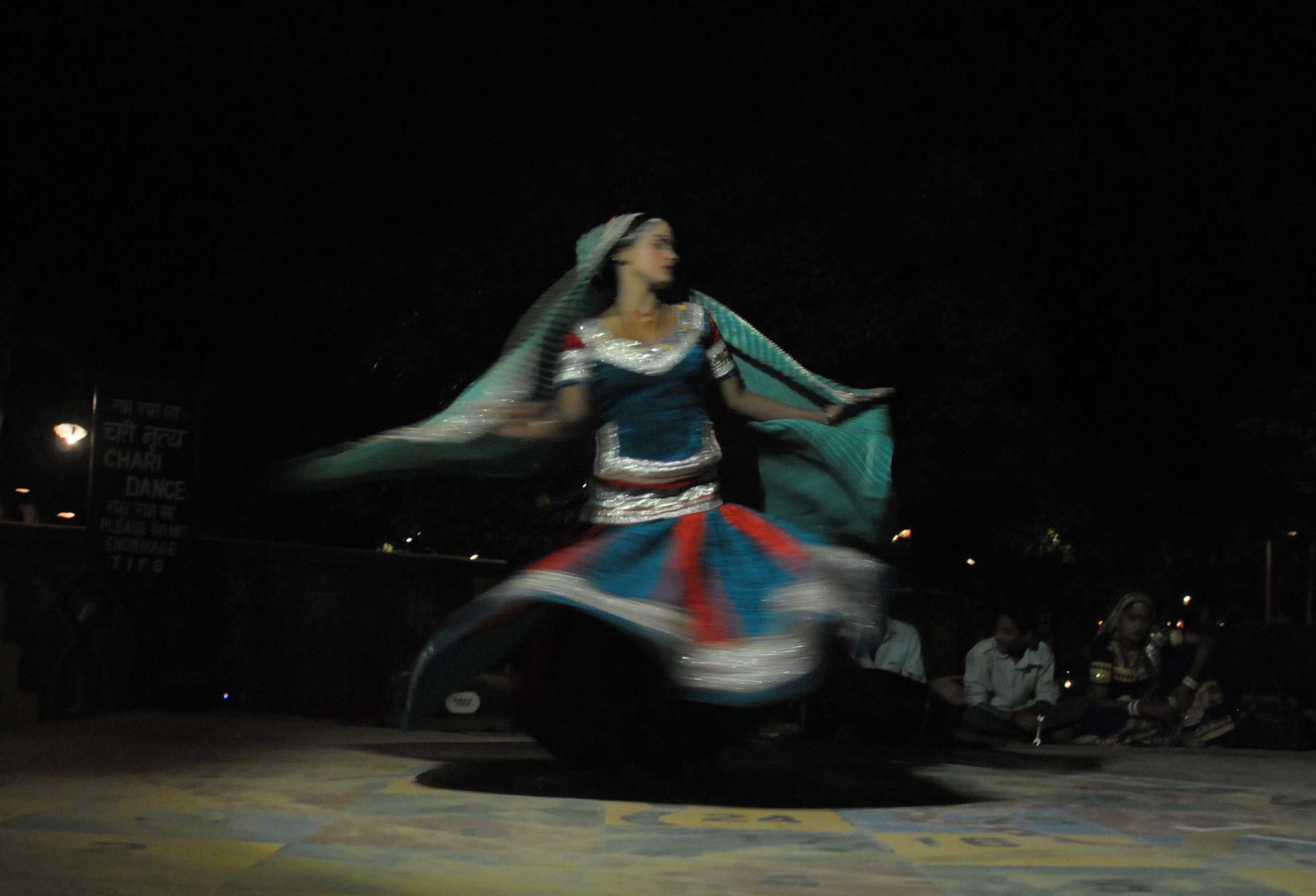
A tribal woman performing ghoomar

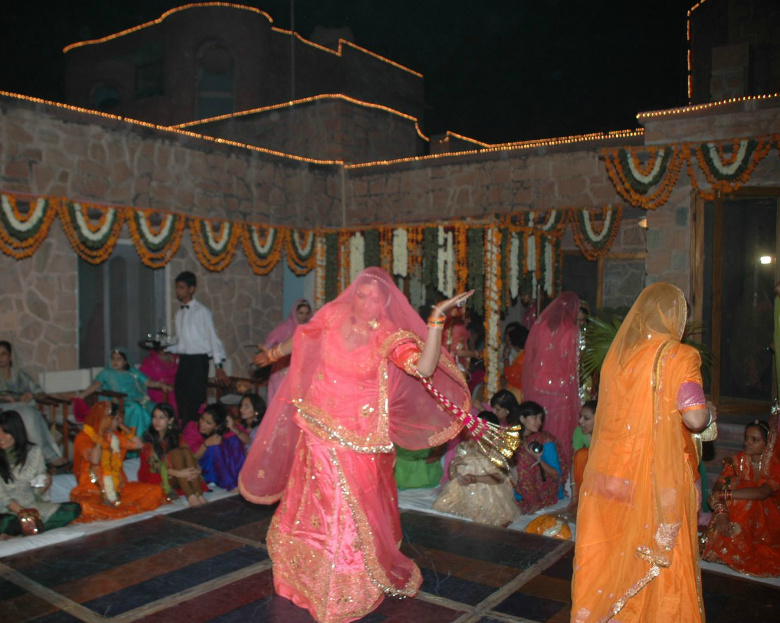
Women performing ghoomar at a wedding

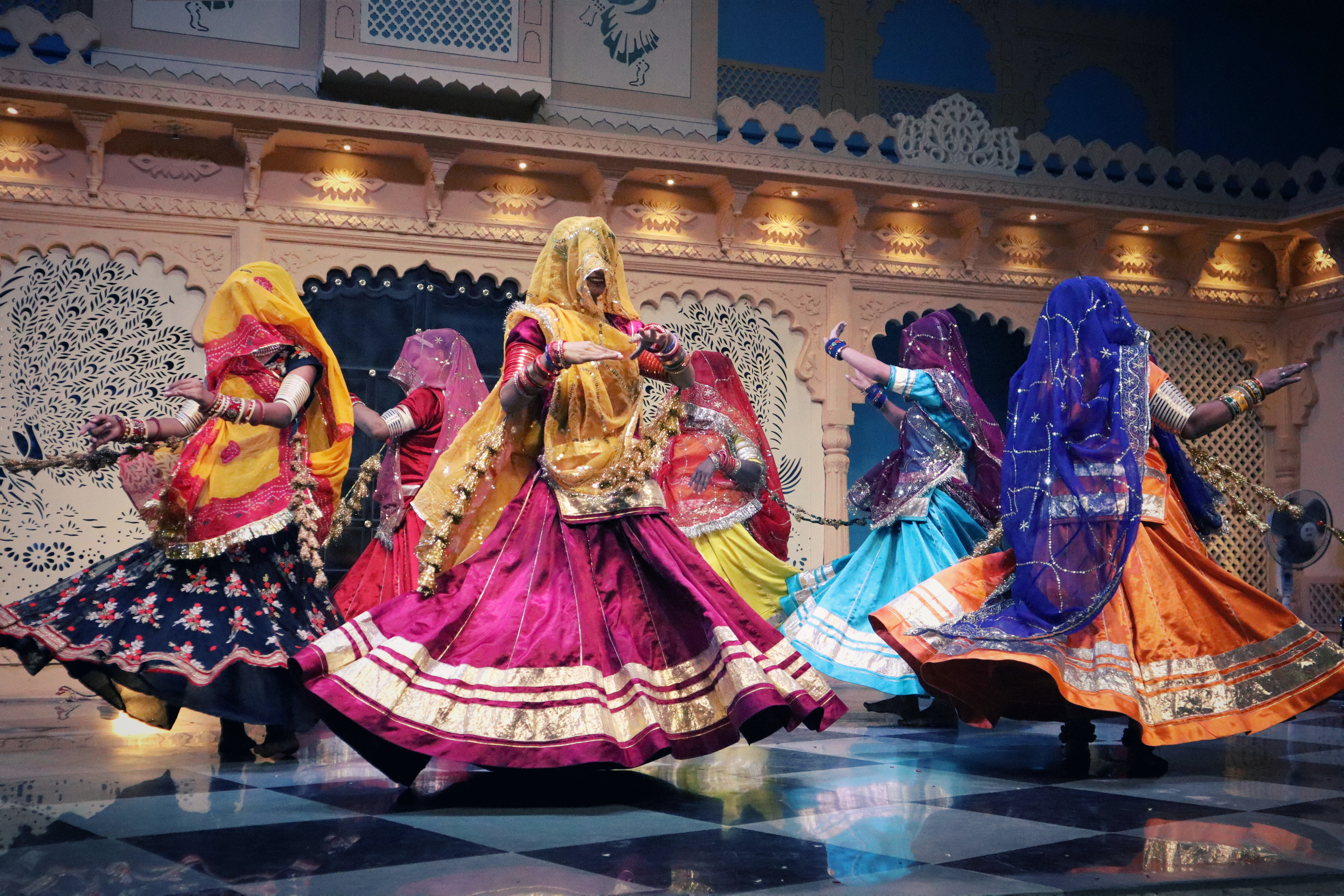
Women performing ghoomar

== See also ==
- Culture of Rajasthan
- Ghoomar (song)
- Kalbelia
