= Rajputi poshak =

Traditional attire of Rajput women of Rajasthan, India

A Rajputi poshak is a traditional full-body attire associated with Rajputs, specifically the Rajputs of Rajasthan, India. It is typically worn by Rajput women and includes four pieces, Ghagra, odhani, kaanchli and futai.

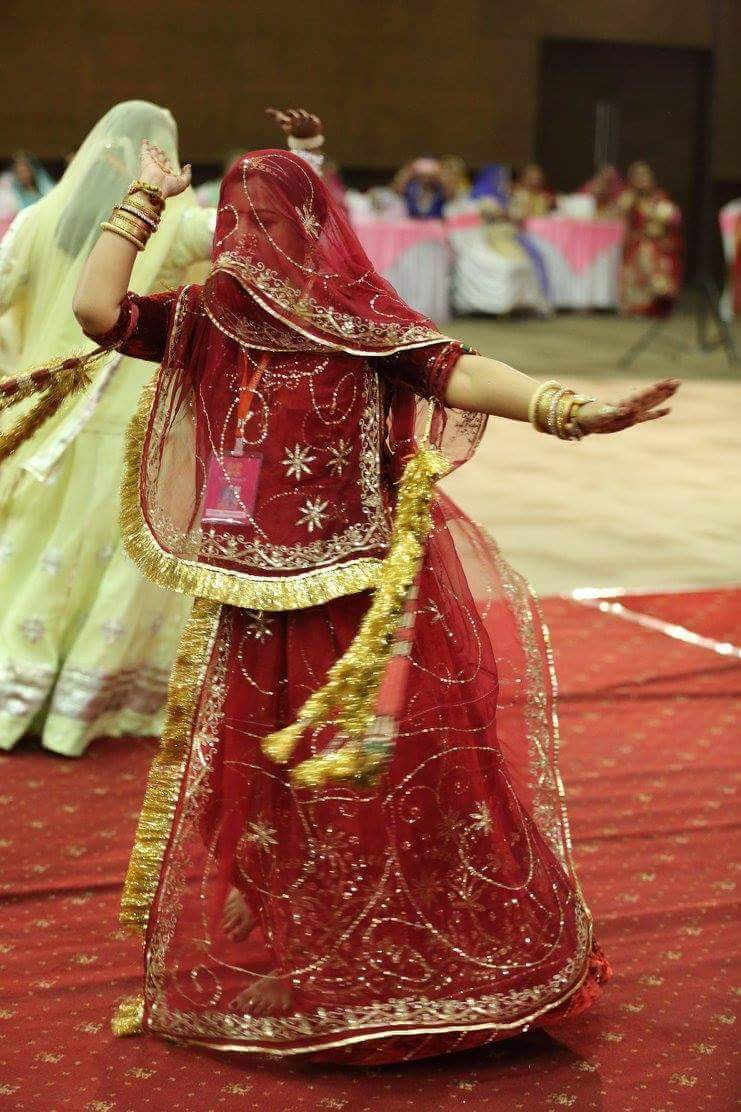
Rajput Woman in a traditional rajput attire performing Ghoomar

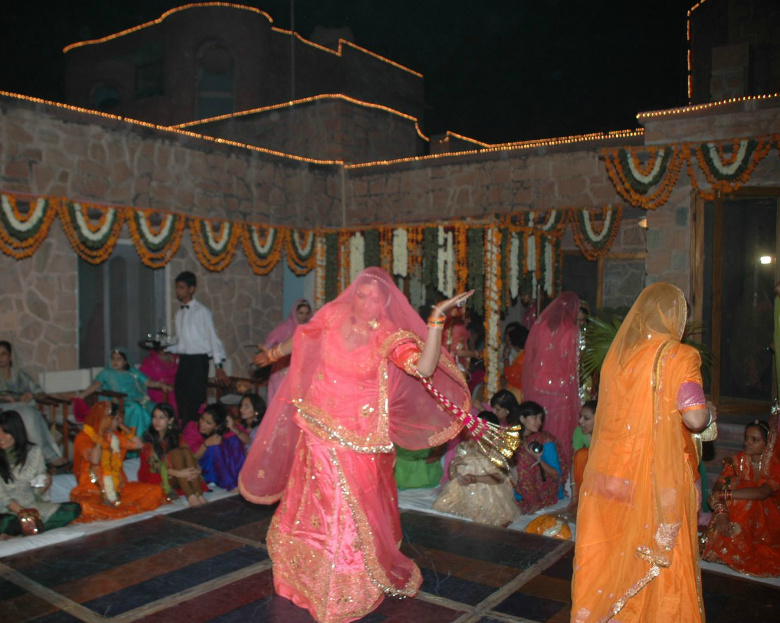
Women performing Ghoomar in traditional attire

== Embroidery and ornamentation ==
=== Gota patti ===
Gotta patti Jaipur technique of embroidery that is characterized by folding the gold and silver lace ribbon in a floral shape and applying the same to the hem of the ghaghra and the edges of odhna and kanchli.

=== Zardozi ===
Zardozi is a type of embroidery that originated in the Mughal-Persian area involving the use of a gold and silver wire, as the name suggests.

=== Mirror works ===
Sheesha kaam is a Technique involving the use of small pieces of glass that are stitched in chains using this embroidery technique.

=== Bandhani ===
Bandhani is a tie and dye technique that is used for making dots.

=== Leheriya ===
Leheriya is a wave pattern dyeing technique from Jodhpur-Marwar.

== Colour meaning ==
Colours in Rajputi Poshaks signify each person's marital status, occasions, and family. Most prevalent colours in Rajasthan include:

- Red dyed: used by brides and married ladies
- Saffron dyed: for Rajput bravery.
- Yellow dyed: for Spring, reproduction, and festival of Teej.
- Green dyed: for newly married ladies
- White dyed: for grief and widowhood
- Dark blue: for dodged auspicious ceremonies in some Traditions of Rajput clans.

== Traditional uses ==
=== Weddings ===
The wedding celebration is an important occasion for the use of the Rajputi Poshak. The bridal outfit is prepared beforehand in huge amounts and its heavy usage of gota-patti, zardozi and mirror work on silk or velvet ghaghra and kanchli is also evident. The bridal dupatta is usually made of a deep red colored fabric called bandhani and is trimmed with gold gota border.

=== Teej ===
Teej is a festival which takes place during rainy season during the occasion of worshiping goddess Parvati which is another important instance for use of poshak outside wedding. The women dresses their up in green or red colored leheriya poshak during processions and swinging activities.

=== Gangaur ===
Gangaur is another festival in Rajasthan where unmarried women pray for better husband and married women pray for husband’s wellbeing. It is a celebration of the marriage of Lord Shiva and goddess Parvati and occurs in Chaitra month which is March to April. The poshak used is mostly red colored with silver embroidery.
