= Thakur Hari Singh =

British Indian soldier (1863–1903)

Col. Thakur Hari Singh Shekhawat
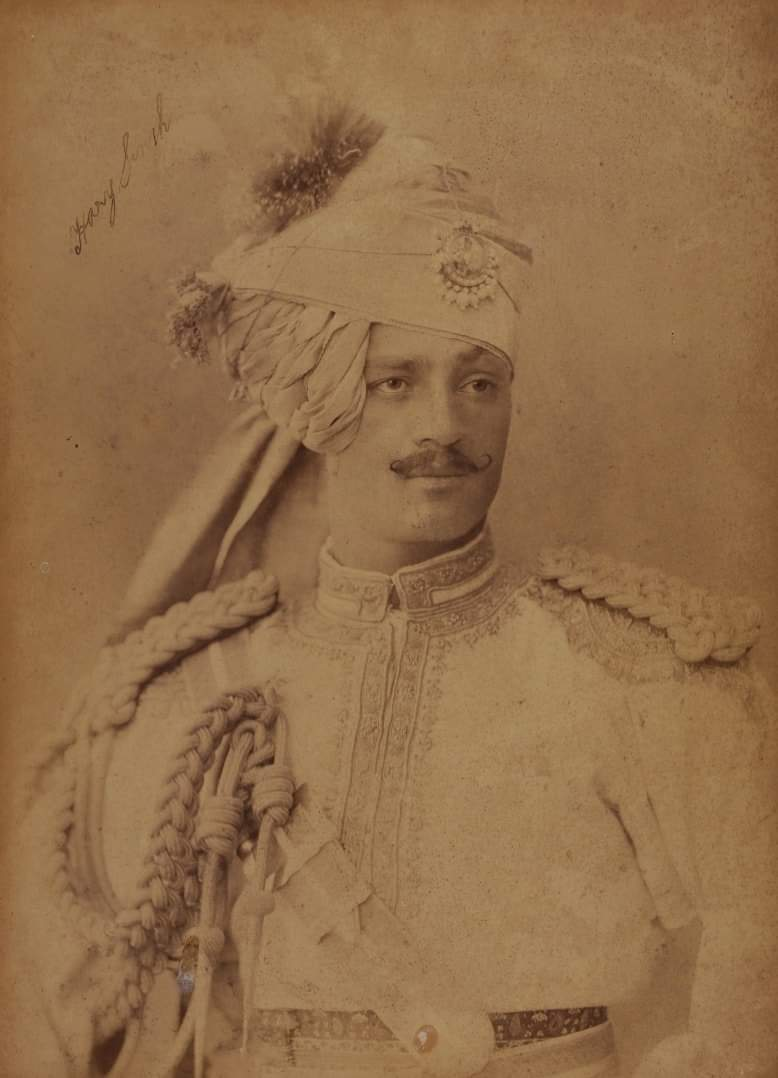
- Thakur Hari Singh of Deoli
- Born: 25 September 1863; Barwasi, Nawalgarh
- Died: 1902 (aged 38–39); Jodhpur, India
- Military career
- Allegiance: (United Kingdom) British Empire
- Branch: British Indian Army
- Service years: 1880–1903
- Rank: Colonel
- Nickname: "Harji of Deoli"
- Commands: Jodhpur Lancers
- Conflicts: Second Afghan War; Tirah Campaign
- Awards: India Medal

Hari Singh was the commanding officer of the Jodhpur lancers from the Shekhawat clan. Sir Pratap made him Thakur of Deoli. He was the Father of Major Dalpat Singh, who is known as the "Hero of Haifa" for his actions during the Battle of Haifa during World War I.

Part of Hari Singh's distinction was that he was an outstanding polo player.

== Early life ==
Thakur Hari Singh was born in the Shekhawat rajput clan in Barwasi, Nawalgarh. At a young age, he joined the Jodhpur Lancers and later became an officer. He later served in the Second Afghan War, during the Tirah Campaign.

== Gallery ==
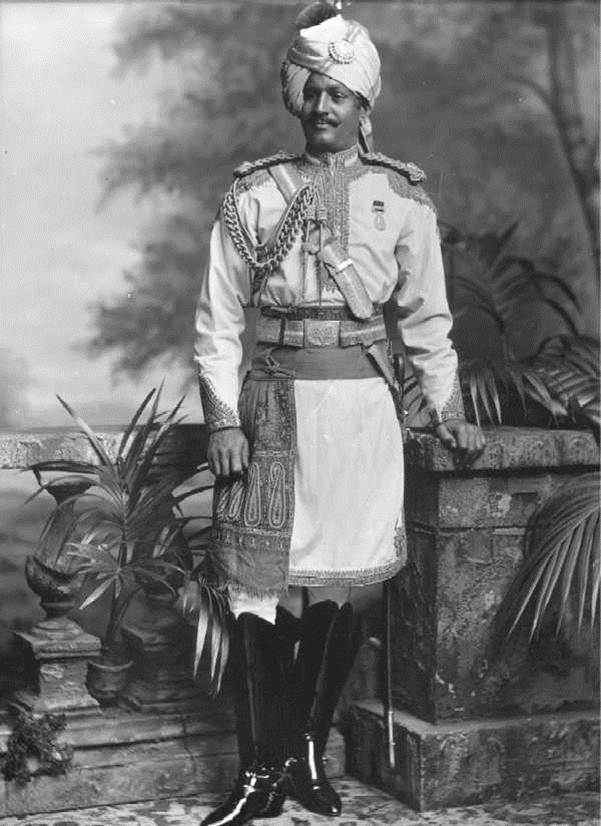
Singh in full dress uniform

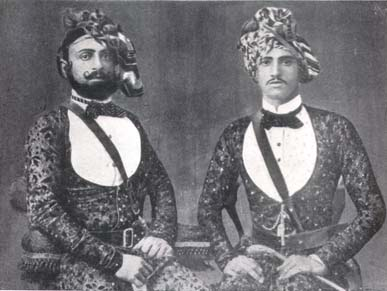
Sir Pratap Singh and Thakur Hari Singh visit Britain for the Diamond Jubilee of Queen Victoria

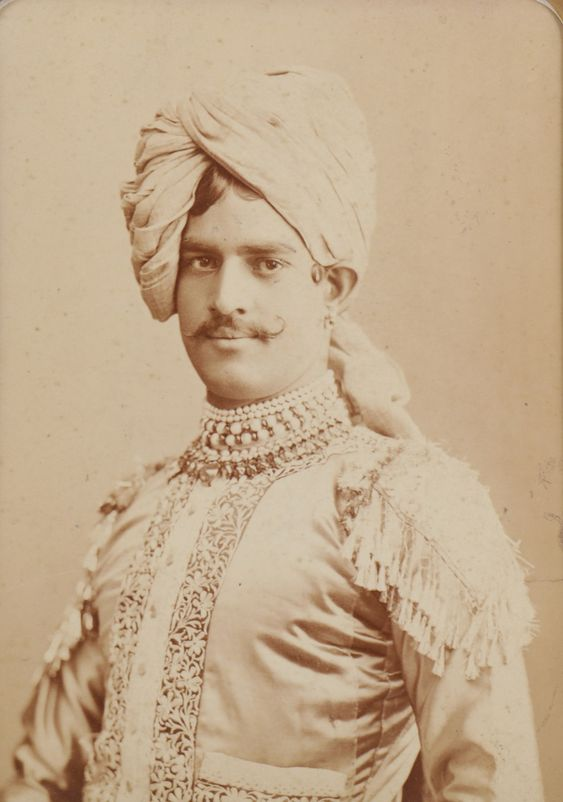
