= Battle of Haifa (1918) =

Battle of World War I

Coordinates: 32°49′0″N 34°59′0″E

- Part of the Middle Eastern theatre of World War I
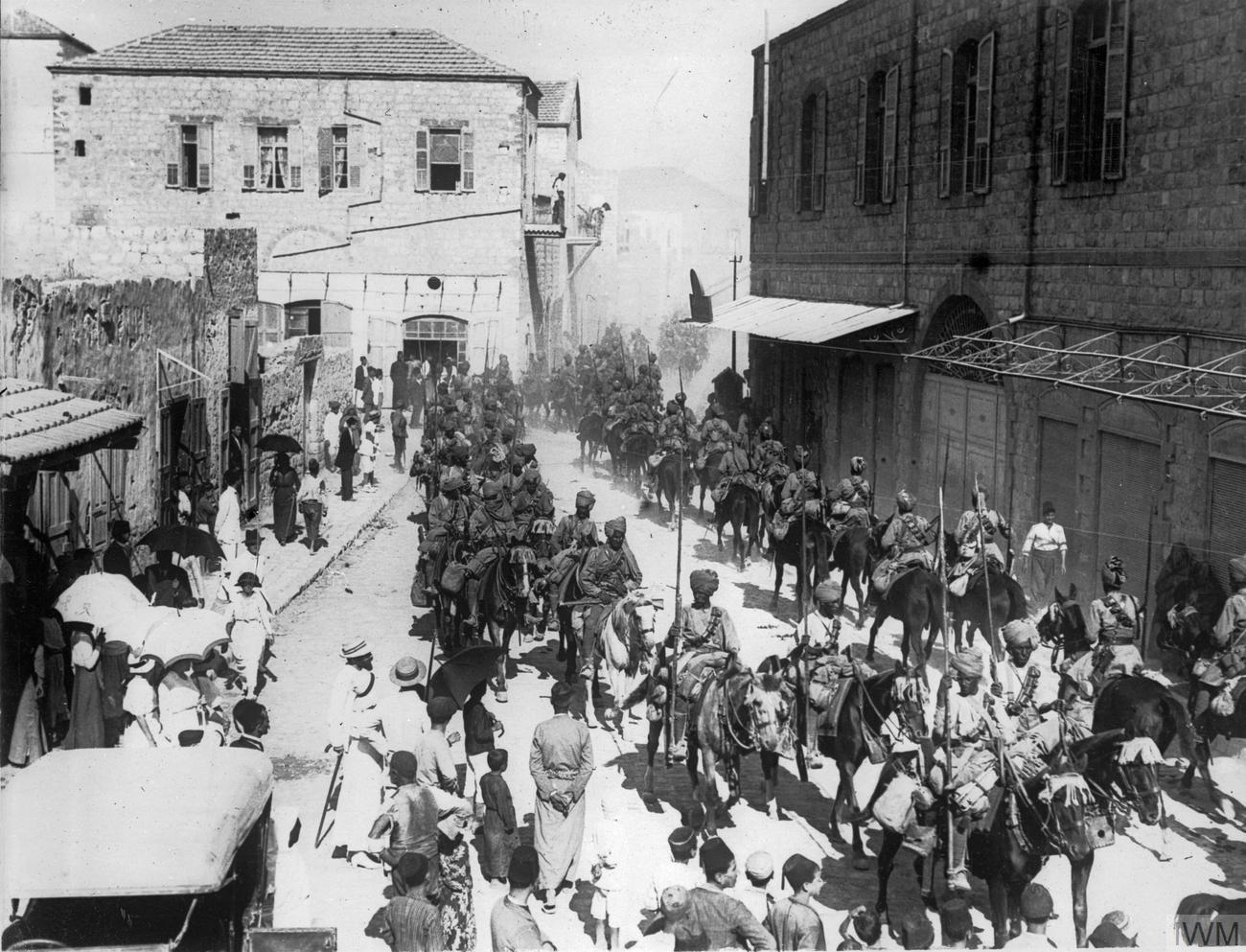
- Jodhpur lancers marching through Haifa after it was captured
Date	23 September 1918
Location	Haifa, Ottoman Empire
Result	British–Indian victory
Territorial changes	Port changed hands enabling the British to land supplies closer to their front line.

Belligerents
British Empire: British India; Kingdom of Jodhpur; Kingdom of Mysore	Ottoman Empire; German Empire; Austria-Hungary

Commanders and leaders
(United Kingdom of Great Britain and Ireland) Cyril Rodney Harbord (British Raj) Dalpat Singh Shekhawat	(Ottoman Empire) Unknown local commander

Casualties and losses
8 killed; 34 wounded	Prisoners; 2 German officers; 23 Ottoman officers; 664 other ranks

The Battle of Haifa was fought on 23 September 1918 towards the end of the Battle of Sharon which together with the Battle of Nablus formed the set piece Battle of Megiddo fought between 19 and 25 September during the last months of the Sinai and Palestine Campaign of the First World War. During the Battle of Haifa, the Indian 15th (Imperial Service) Cavalry Brigade, 5th Cavalry Division and part of the Desert Mounted Corps attacked rearguard forces of the Ottoman Empire, resulting in the capture of the towns of Haifa and Acre. This attack took place at the north western edge of the Esdraelon Plain (also known as the Jezreel Valley and the plain of Armageddon), 40–50 miles (64–80 km) from Sharon.

The Battle of Megiddo had begun with an attack by British Empire infantry along an almost continuous line from the Mediterranean Sea across the Plain of Sharon into the foothills of the Judean Hills. They attacked the Ottoman front line and captured the headquarters of the Ottoman Eighth Army at Tulkarm, the trenches at Tabsor and pivoted at Arara. The Eighth Army was outflanked on the coast and British Empire cavalry moved north through the gap created. The Desert Mounted Corps almost encircled the infantry in the Judean Hills capturing their main lines of supply, communications and retreat. By 25 September, one Ottoman army had been destroyed, and what remained of two others, were in retreat northwards to Damascus.

The 5th Cavalry Division was assigned the task of capturing Haifa and Acre after several earlier attempts were stopped by strong rearguard positions. A squadron from the Mysore Lancers, and a squadron from the Sherwood Rangers Yeomanry, 15th (Imperial Service) Cavalry Brigade formed the initial attack on an Austrian artillery battery before moving forward with the Jodhpur Lancers and a light car patrol, to attack the main German rearguard position and capture the town. This day of 23 September every year is celebrated as Haifa Day.

== Background ==
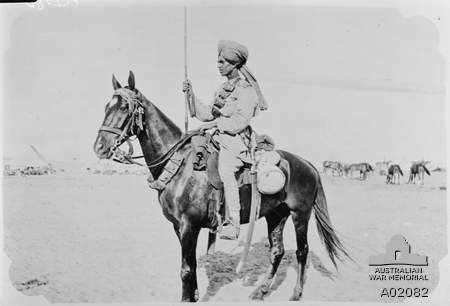
Mysorean Lancer Sowar and horse

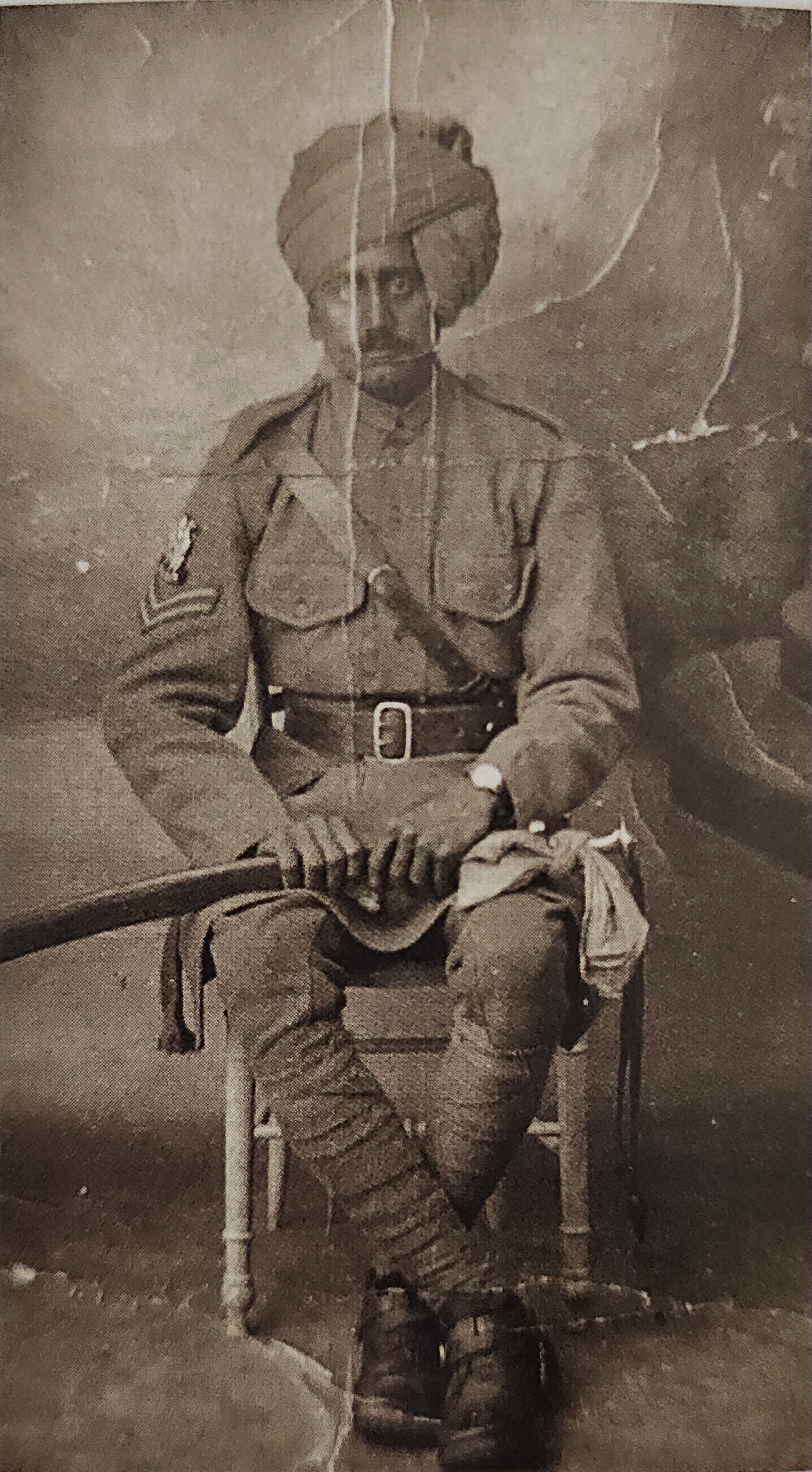
Jodhpur Lancer Sowar

The 5th Cavalry Division were formed with three brigades, two of them composed of one British yeomanry regiment, and two British Indian Army cavalry regiments; one of which was usually lancers. Part of the Desert Mounted Corps, it was supported by machine guns, artillery, and light armoured car units. The division's third brigade was the 15th (Imperial Service) Cavalry Brigade, normally comprising three cavalry regiments from the Indian Princely States of Jodhpur, Mysore and Hyderabad.

Following the successful advance and virtual encirclement of the Ottoman Seventh and Eighth Armies in the Judean Hills with the captures of Afulah and Nazareth, the Yildirim Army Group general headquarters was out of communication with its three armies. All direct routes northwards were controlled by the Desert Mounted Corps. Thus, the retreating Seventh Army and what remained of the Eighth Army were forced to withdraw along minor roads or tracks, eastwards across the Jordan River, towards the Hedjaz railway. The capture of Haifa was essential for any further advances by the Egyptian Expeditionary Force since the roads leading to the port were little more than tracks and its capture was urgently required for landing supplies.

== Prelude ==
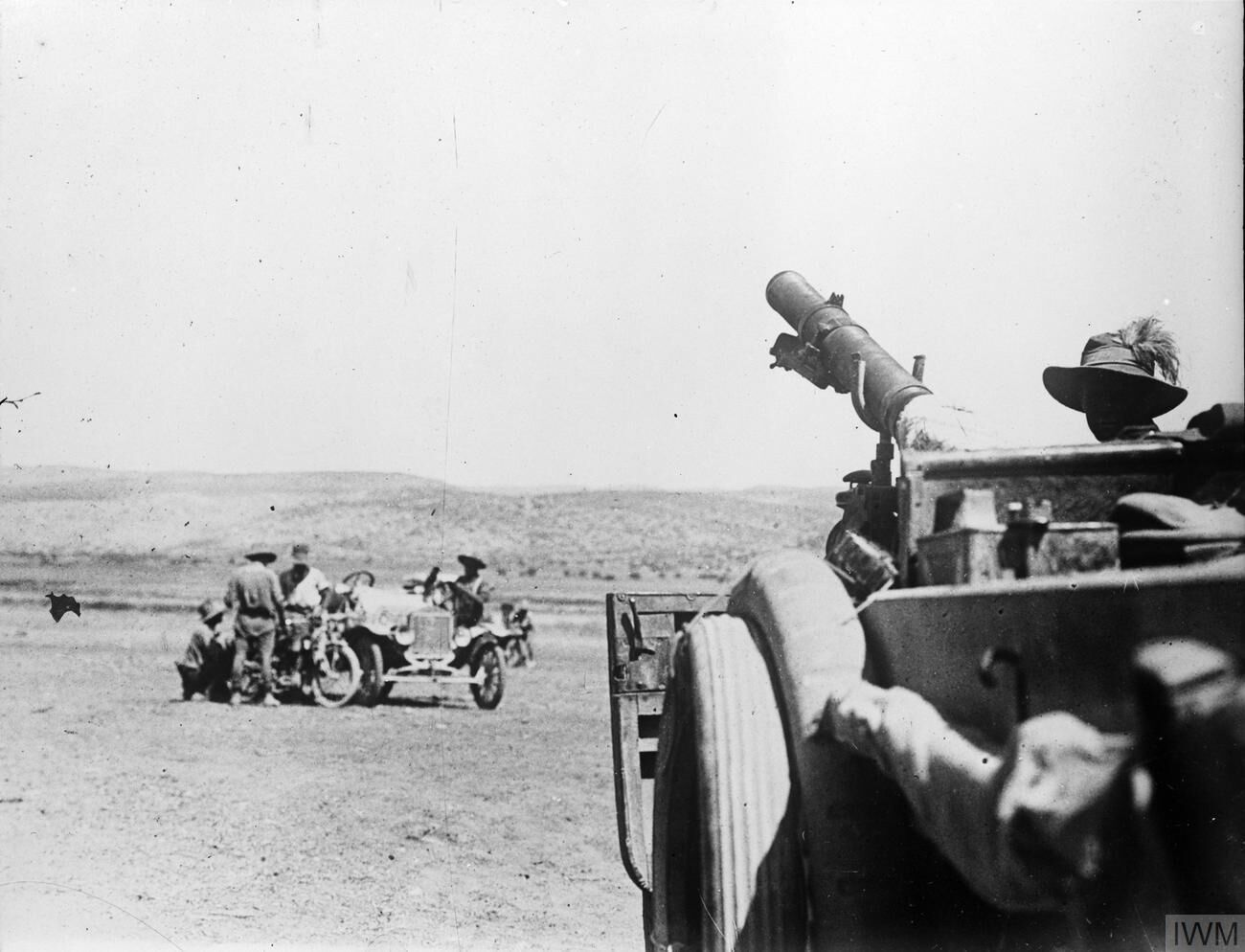
1st Australian Light Armoured Car Patrol on the coast road west of Mount Carmel

Shortly after midnight on 21/22 September, the 18th King George's Own Lancers, part of the 13th Cavalry Brigade, were advancing along the Acre road to the west of the town when they were attacked by an Ottoman battalion from Haifa. They routed the battalion after a short fight inflicting 30 casualties and capturing more than 200 prisoners.

On 22 September an aerial reconnaissance reported that Haifa had been evacuated by the Ottoman army. This was found to be inaccurate when the Haifa Annexation Expedition was stopped by accurate Ottoman artillery and machine gun fire. A reconnaissance by armoured cars of the Light Car Patrol encountered a redoubt 200 yards (180 m) from the road to Haifa. This strong rearguard with machine guns was supported by effectively positioned artillery deployed on the lower slopes of Mount Carmel. The redoubt was fired on by the cars' machine guns and quickly surrendered, while 2 miles (3.2 km) further on they encountered an Austrian battery of light field guns supported by German machine gunners which stopped the reconnaissance force. They controlled the approach road from the east which ran between the mountain and the Nahr el Muqatta. This strong position could not be outflanked because the Nahr el Mugatta river was edged on both sides by marshes making it virtually impossible to cross. The 5th Cavalry Division was ordered to capture Haifa and Acre 12 miles (19 km) north west the following day.

== Battle ==
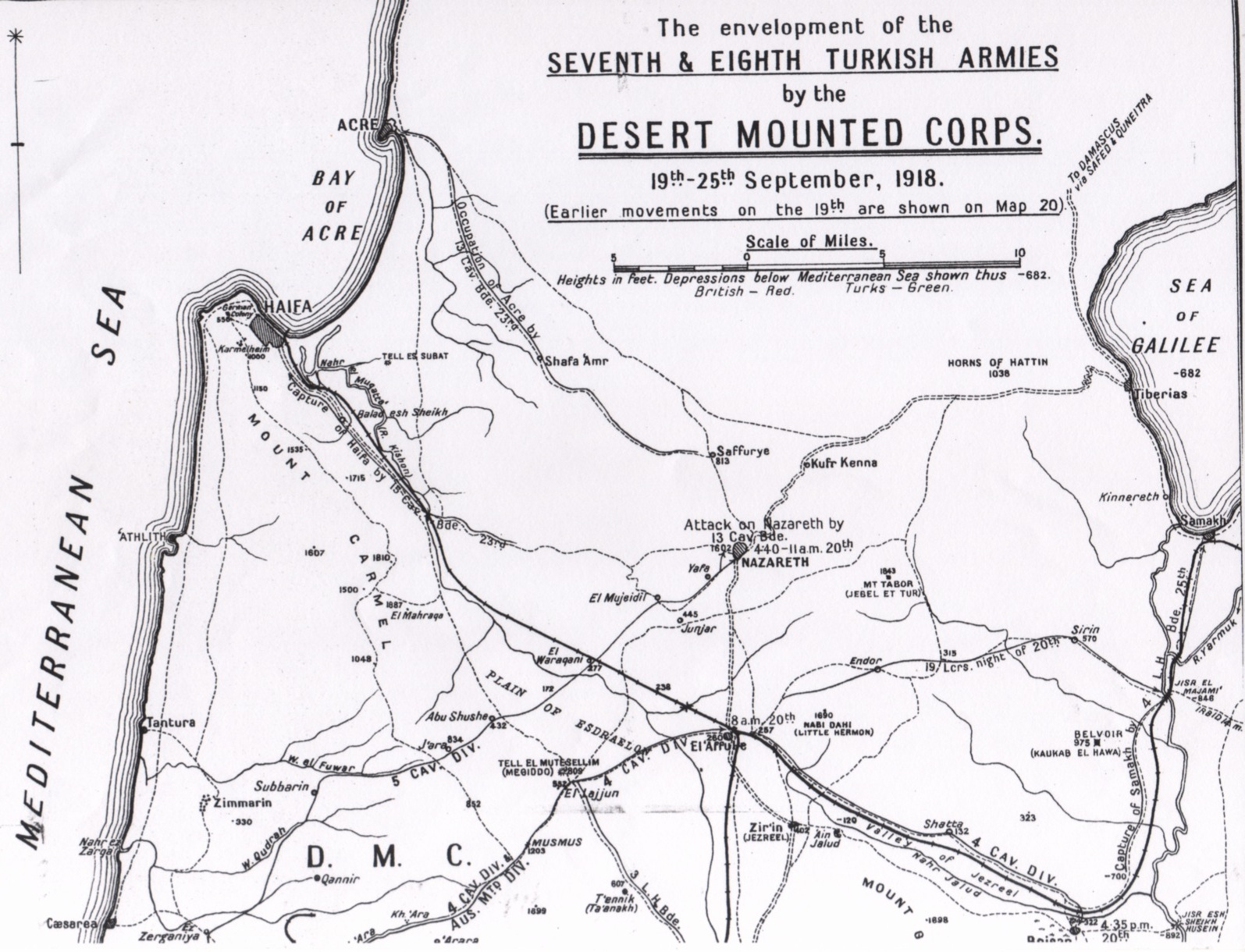
Falls Map 21 Cavalry advances 19 to 25 September. Detail shows capture of Haifa and Acre

On 23 September 1918, the 15th (Imperial Service) Cavalry Brigade was ordered to capture Haifa. The area between the Nahr al-Muqaṭṭaʿ, also known as the Kishon River, and the slopes of Mount Carmel was well defended by Ottoman gun emplacements and artillery. The brigade's Jodhpur Lancers were tasked to capture this position, while the Mysore Lancers moved around to attack the town from the east and north.

A squadron of the Mysore Lancers and a squadron of the Sherwood Rangers Yeomanry, supported by B Battery, Honourable Artillery Company, attacked the Austrian battery of light field guns on the slopes of Mount Carmel at 14:00 hours. The squadron of Mysore Lancers had moved into position by climbing up a steep track to capture and silence the guns, while the Jodhpur Lancers launched the main mounted attack on the rearguard of German machine gunners, which blocked the road 2 miles (3.2 km) on from the redoubt captured the day before by the Light Car Patrol.

The Jodhpur Lancers charged the Ottoman position, crossing the Acre railway line, but came under machine gun and artillery fire. The charge was further obstructed by quicksand on the river banks, so they manoeuvred to the left onto the lower slopes of Mount Carmel. Colonel Harvey had given instructions to the brigades to hold the Turks with gunfire while the Jodhpur lancers were to charge them. According to a regimental account of the Jodhpur Lancers, the position was defended by about 1,000 Ottoman troops with 15 guns and several machine guns. During the manoeuvre around the river, Major Dalpat Singh Shekhawat was hit by machine-gun fire and killed. B Squadron of the Jodhpur Lancers then charged the position, overrunning the machine-gun detachment and securing the route towards Haifa.

The regiment captured the position, taking thirty prisoners, two machine guns and two camel guns, and opened an access route into Haifa. The Jodhpur Lancers continued their charge into the town, surprising the defenders. Those Mysore Lancers who had been giving fire support to the attacking regiment, mounted and followed them into the town. Together the two regiments captured 1,350 German and Ottoman prisoners, including two German officers, 35 Ottoman officers, 17 artillery guns including four 4.2 guns, eight 77mm guns and four camel guns as well as a 6-inch naval gun, and 11 machine guns. Their own casualties amounted to eight dead and 34 wounded. 60 horses were killed and another 83 were injured.

We tried to cover the Turks' retreat, but we expected them to do something, if only keep their heads. At last we decided they were not worth fighting for.

— A captured German officer

Only the Jo hukums (Jodhpur lancers) could have done it. That day the jo hukums had to be restrained as they galloped through the streets of Haifa, even after all the machine gun posts had fallen, towards the placid and unknowing Mediterranean, spearing and butchering unfortunate Turks who crossed their path, civilians even, for the Rathores were crazed with rage. They had seen far too many of their brothers fall.

— historian, Charles C Trench, remarks in his book, "The Indian army and the King's Enemies"

== Aftermath ==
Soon afterwards the 13th Cavalry Brigade captured Acre, to the north, together with its garrison of 150 men and two artillery guns. On 26 September, the 300 strong remnant of the Haifa garrison arrived at Beirut and were ordered inland to Riyak, to the north of Damascus.

Allenby reported on 25 September to the War Office regarding the proposed advance to Aleppo and the general situation of the battle:

I have your HW wire and that from Troopers proposing a Cavalry raid to Aleppo. I don't think Aleppo possible; but am sending 3 Divisions of Cavalry, as soon as I can, to Damascus. Chaytor's Division of Anzac Light Horse is about Amman now, and will deal with enemy coming from the South. Prisoners number well over 40,000 and are still coming in. I have Australian mounted troops at the S. end of Lake Tiberias, and they are pushing to Tiberias. If I get Damascus, Beirut falls to us certainly; and I hope to push troops, Northwards, thither, by the coast–road from Haifa, feeding from the sea, stage by stage.

— Allenby to Wilson CIGS War Office 25 September 1918

By 29 September, the 7th (Meerut) Division was concentrated at Haifa with the XXI Corps Cavalry Regiment at Acre in preparation for their march to Beirut. The Jodhpur Lancers' commander Major Dalpat Singh, who is considered as the 'Hero' of the battle was killed in the battle, was posthumously awarded the Military Cross. The Jodhpur and Mysore Lancers are now represented by the 61st Cavalry Regiment in the Indian Army and still commemorate the battle every year on 23 September as Haifa Day.

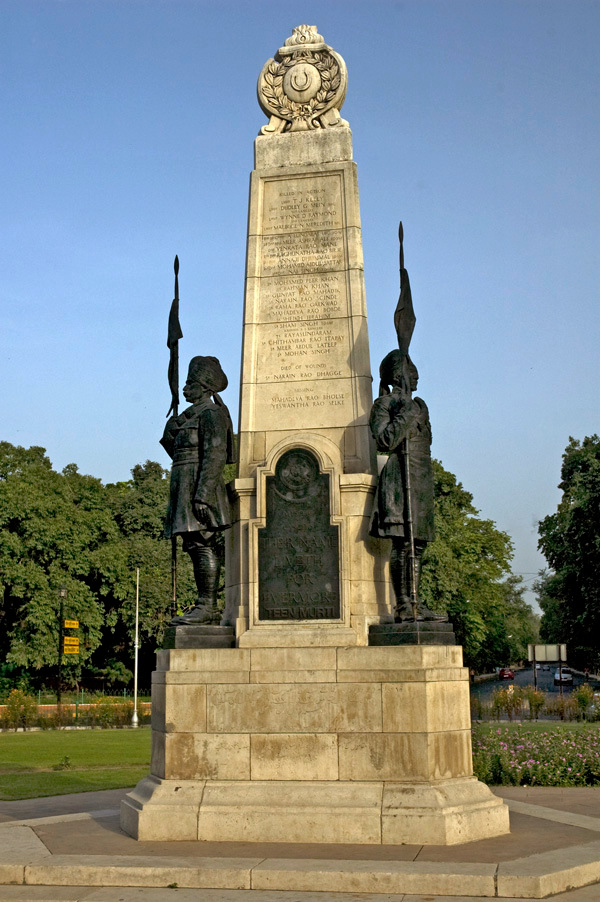
Memorial to the Imperial Service Cavalry Brigade, New Delhi

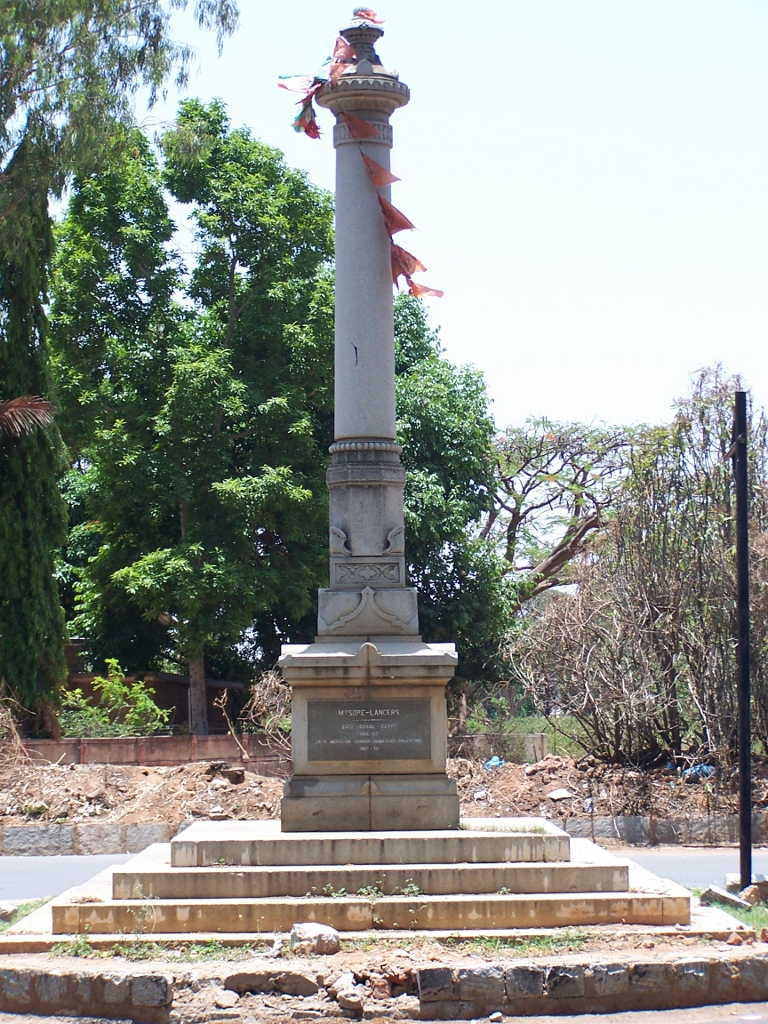
Mysore Lancers Memorial at Bangalore for lives lost in Egypt & Palestine

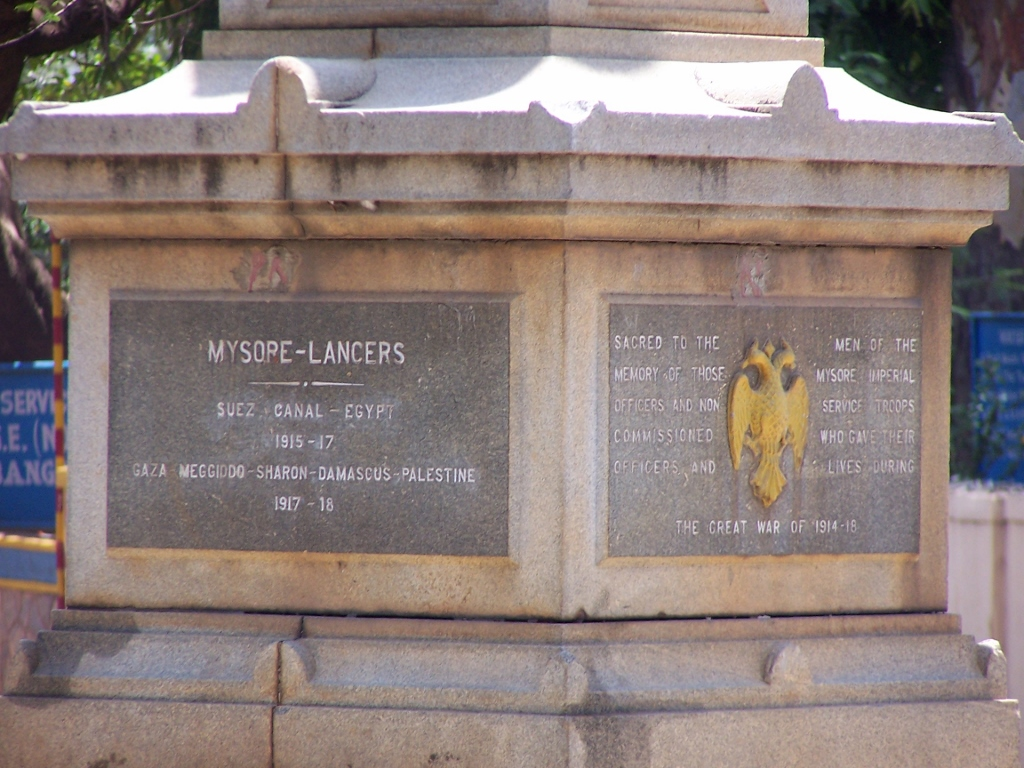
Mysore Lancers Memorial at Bangalore for lives lost in Egypt & Palestine

== See also ==
- Indian Army during World War I
- India in World War II
