= Thakur Gadadhar Singh =

Indian soldier and author (1869 - 1920)

Thakur Gadadhar Singh (1869–1920) was a British Raj Indian soldier and author. He wrote several travelogues and commentaries. Singh is considered to be the founder of the Hindi travel literature genre alongside Bharatendu Harishchandra, and his travelogue Chin Me Terah Mas (Thirteen Months in China) is often considered one of the first book-length overseas travel narratives written in Hindi.

== Biography ==
Gadadhar Singh was born during the British Raj era in October 1869 in village Sanchedi, now in Kanpur Dehat district to a Rajput family of the Chandel clan. His father, Thakur Dariyao Singh, was also a soldier in the 5th Bengal Native (Light) Infantry from 1864 to 1878. After completing his secondary school education, he enlisted in the 7th Rajput Regiment (also known as the 7th (Duke of Connaught's Own) Rajputs) in 1886 when the regiment was stationed at Fort William, India. That same year he was dispatched to Burma (now Myanmar) as part of a force sent to quell the resistance after the Third Anglo-Burmese War. As he was literate he was made a teacher in the British Indian Army. He was not a commissioned officer. During the Boxer Rebellion, Singh was among the 500 7th Rajput soldiers, who along with other Indian troops, made up most of the 3,000 strong British men in the Eight-Nation Alliance forces numbering about 20,000 men. The 7th Rajput left Calcutta on 29 June 1900. Singh returned to India from Beijing in September 1901.

Singh was one of the 27 men who represented the 7th Rajput in England at the coronation ceremonies of Edward VII as part of a larger British Indian Army contingent. He & another naik (rank equivalent to corporal), 21 sepoys and 3 havildars (rank equivalent to sergeant) were part of this unit headed by Subedar Adhar Singh. This contingent left Lucknow on 10 May 1902, sailed from Bombay on 24 May, arrived in Southampton on 12 June, participated in the coronation on 9 August, then returned to India. He lived in the Dilkusha neighborhood in Lucknow till November 1905, when his regiment was dispatched to the North-West Frontier Province.

Singh self-published his account of his experiences in China in 1902 from Lucknow. He wrote a book about his experiences in England in 1903. He wrote at least 9 other commentaries on England and Japan, and others mainly focused on social reform and women's issues.

He died in British ruled India in October 1920 at the age of fifty before his 51st birthday.

== Works ==
List of works

- Chin Me Terah Mas (1902; self-published) - English Translation, edited by Anand Yang, translated by Kamal Sheel & Ranjana Sheel: Thirteen Months in China: A Subaltern Indian and the Colonial World. New Delhi: Oxford University Press. 2017. ISBN 9780199476466.
- Hamari Edward Tilak Yatra (My Journey to the Coronation of Edward)
- Bushido (the Japanese Way of the Warrior)
- Karuna Kahani (1916, A Tale of Compassion)
- Vilayati Ramaniya/Bhraman (1918, Happy Wonderings in Foreign Lands)
- Japan Ki Raj Vyavastha (The Political Administration of Japan)
- Rus-Japan-Yudh (Russo-Japanese War), vols. 1 & 2
- Parivarik Upasna (Famililal Worship)
- Buddhadeo Darshan (The Philosophy of Lord Buddha)
- Yuddha aur Shanti Parichaya (Introduction to War and Peace)
- Chashma aur Chakshu (Spectacles and Eyes)
- Vanita Hitaishi (Friends of Woman) - Periodical journal on woman's issues, education and empowerment
