= Dalpat Singh (Indian Army officer) =

British Indian soldier (1892–1918)

Thakur Dalpat Singh Shekhawat
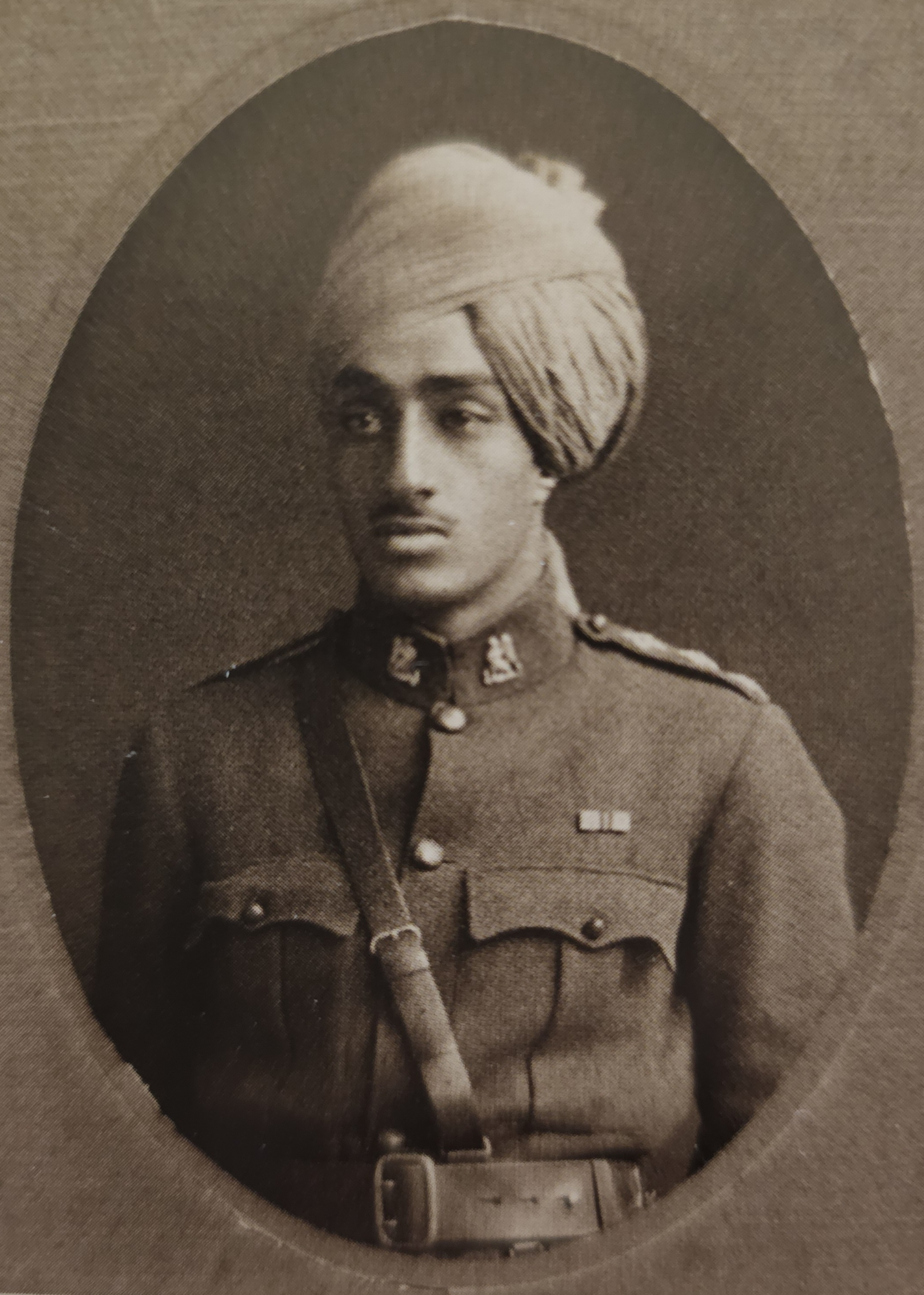
- Portrait of Dalpat Singh Shekhawat
- Born: Dalpat Singh; 26 January 1892; Jodhpur, Jodhpur State, British Raj (modern-day Rajasthan, India
- Died: 23 September 1918 (aged 26); Haifa, OETA (modern-day Israel)
- Military career
- Allegiance: (United Kingdom) British Empire
- Branch: British Indian Army
- Service years: 1910–1918
- Rank: Major
- Nickname: "Hero of Haifa"
- Unit: 15th (Imperial Service) Cavalry Brigade
- Commands: Jodhpur Lancers
- Conflicts: Battle of Haifa (1918); First World War
- Awards: Military Cross (posthumously)

Thakur Dalpat Singh MC (November 1892 – 23 September 1918) was a British Indian Army officer, known as the "Hero of Haifa" for his actions in the Battle of Haifa during World War I.

== Early life ==
Singh was born to a noble family of the Shekhawat clan of Rawana Rajputs (रावणा राजपूत) in the princely state of Jodhpur, Rajasthan, then under the British Raj. He was the son of Col.Thakur Hari Singh of Deoli.

== Military career ==
By 1918, Singh was commander of the 15th (Imperial Service) Cavalry Brigade, which consisted of regiments of Indian troops from Jodhpur ("Jodhpur Lancers"), Hyderabad, Mysore, Patiala and Alwar. The 15th Brigade served alongside the British Army during the last months of the Sinai and Palestine Campaign of the First World War.

On 23 September 1918, a combined British-Indian force, including the Jodhpur Lancers, successfully captured the crucial Port of Haifa from the Ottoman Army. During the battle, Singh was killed.

After the battle, Singh was awarded the Military Cross. His citation read as follows:

For conspicuous gallantry and devotion to duty. This officer, accompanied only by his trumpeter, charged an entrenched machine gun killing and scattering the crew and capturing the gun. At the same time he captured the commandant of a regiment and another officer.

== Commemoration ==
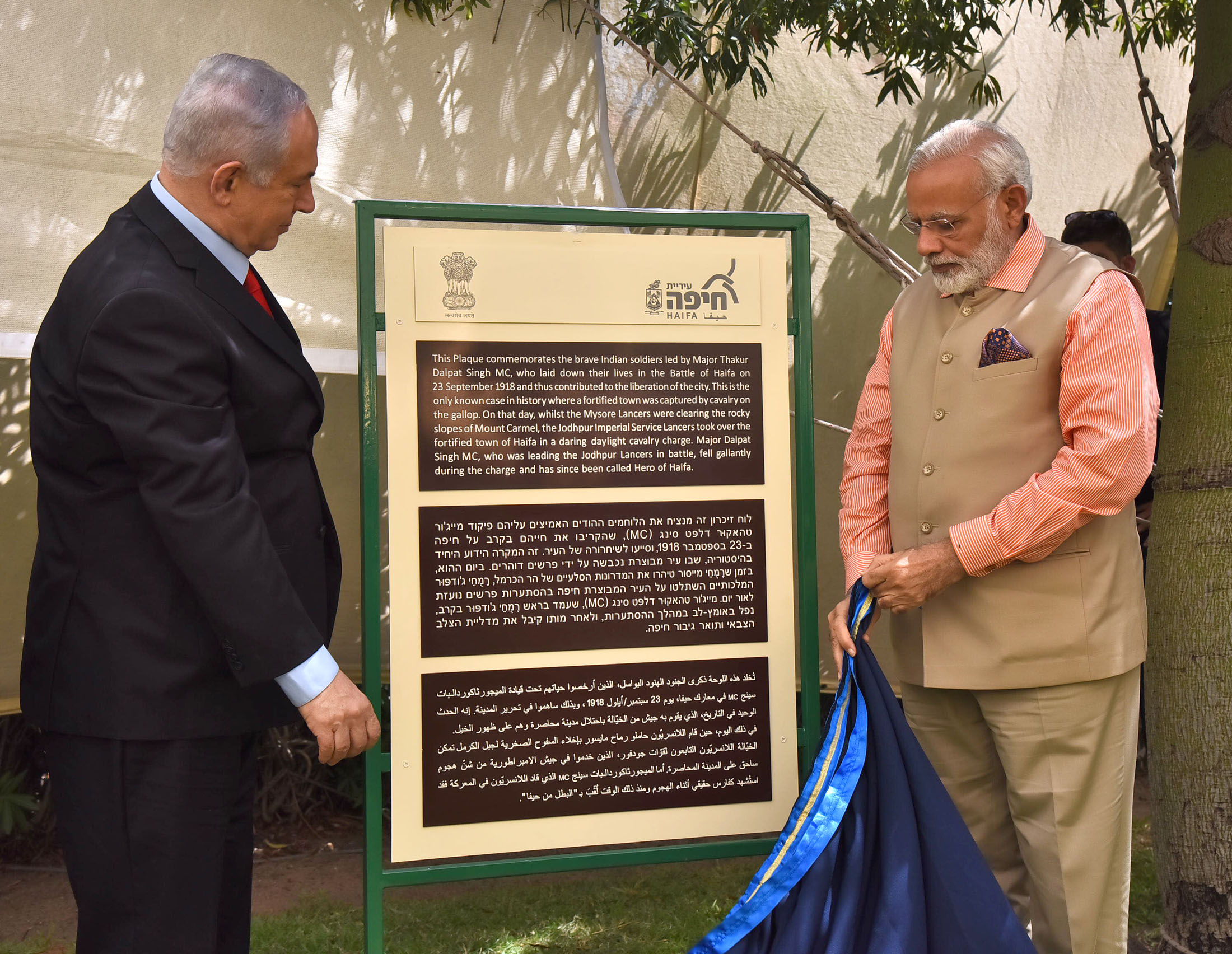

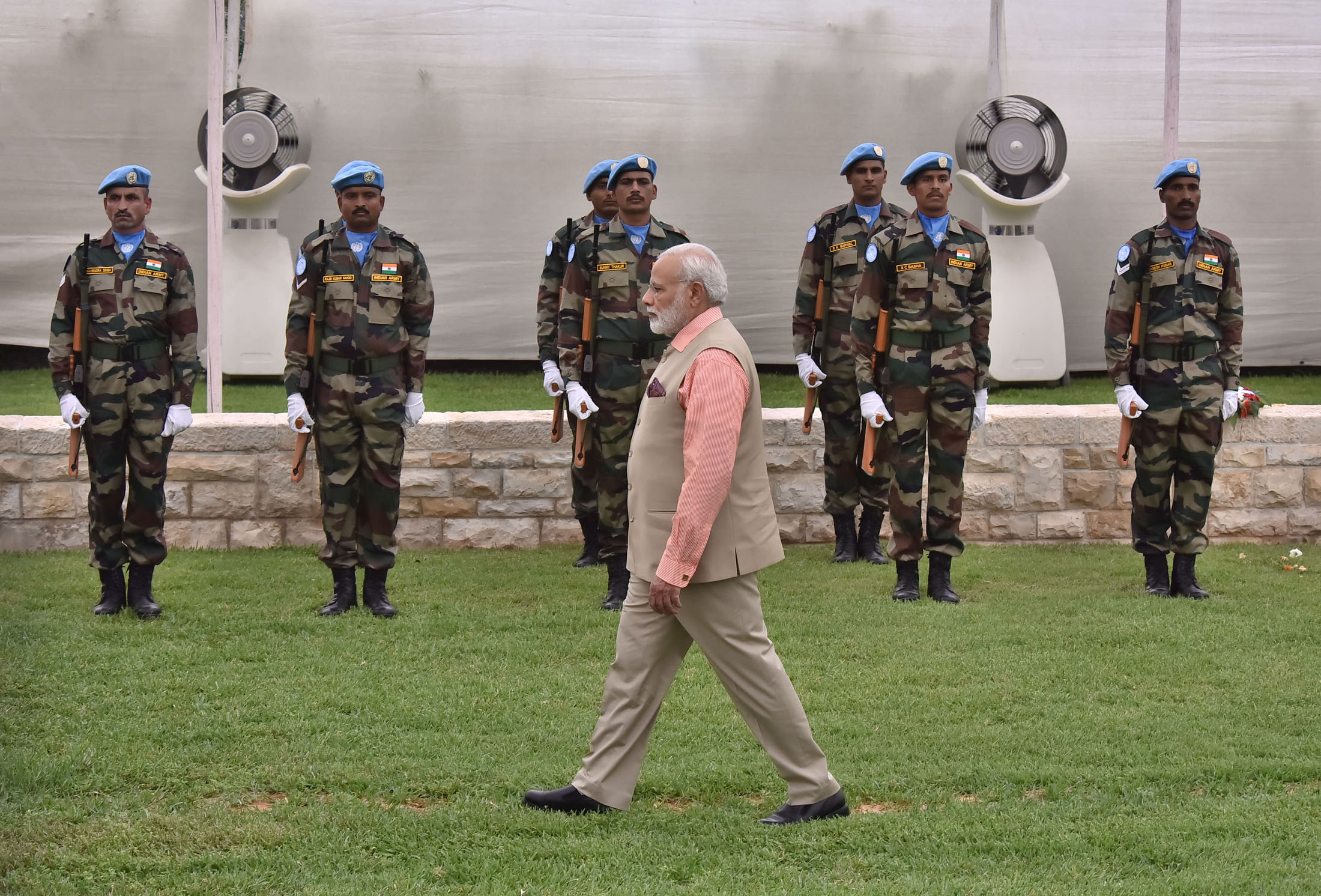
Indian Prime Minister Modi visiting the Indian cemetery in Haifa, Israel (2017)

During a visit to Haifa, Israel, in 2017, Indian Prime Minister Narendra Modi visited the Indian Cemetery and unveiled a plaque to Singh, with Singh's "Hero of Haifa" moniker.

The (1921) Masonic Roll of Honour 1914-1918 as member initiated in Lodge Rajputana No. 2800 E.C on 5 June 1913.

The Mayor of Haifa Yona Yahav, during the centenary year of the battle, paid tribute to Singh, asserting:

Dalpat Singh not only changed the history of my city but the history of the Middle East.
