= Govardhan Kumari =

Indian dancer and dance promoter

- Born: 23 July 1938; Kishangarh, Rajasthan, India
- Died: 9 January 2013 (aged 74)
- Occupations: Ghoomar Dance promoter Dance connoisseur Dance promoter
- Known for: Ghoomar Dance promotion
- Spouse: Late Maharaja Krishna Singh
- Awards: Padma Shri
- Website: http://gangaurghoomar.org/founder-director/

Govardhan Kumari (popularly known as Rajmata sa, 23 July 1938 — 9 January 2013), is the only lady from the Royal Family known for her efforts to revive and promote the authentic style of Ghoomar, a folk dance form of Rajasthan.

== Biography ==
Govardhan Kumari heads the Gangaur Ghoomar Dance Academy , a Mumbai-based dance institution. Under the aegis of the academy, she has contributed to the participation of the students at various dance and cultural festivals, including the festival of ICCR in countries including USSR, Mauritius, Ghana, Nigeria, Morocco, Ivory Coast, Trinidad Tobago, USA, Venezuela, UAE, Oman, Doha 2010, the Capital of Arab Culture, held at Qatar National Theater in September 2010. She made efforts to revive the Rajwadi tradition of Ghoomar dance and in popularising Chari Dance of Kishangarh. The Government of India awarded her the fourth highest civilian Honour of the Padma Shri, in 2007, for her contributions to arts.

The Gangaur Ghoomar Dance Academy, is now being taken forward by her student and assistant, Mrs. Jyothi D. Tommaar, along with associate directors Dr. Pratiba Naitthani and Rajmata sa's daughter in law Maharani Mandakini Kumari of Santrampur, Gujarat.

== See also ==
- Ghoomar
- Chari Dance
