= Aligarh =

- City
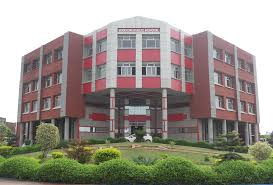
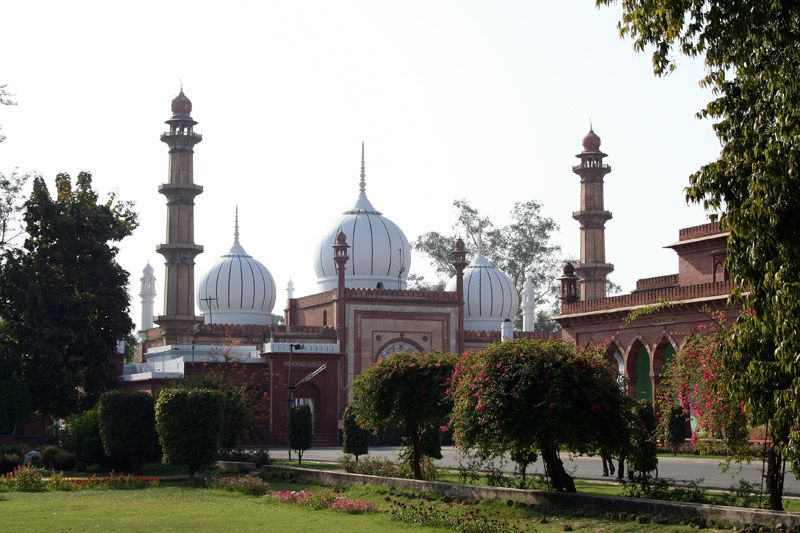
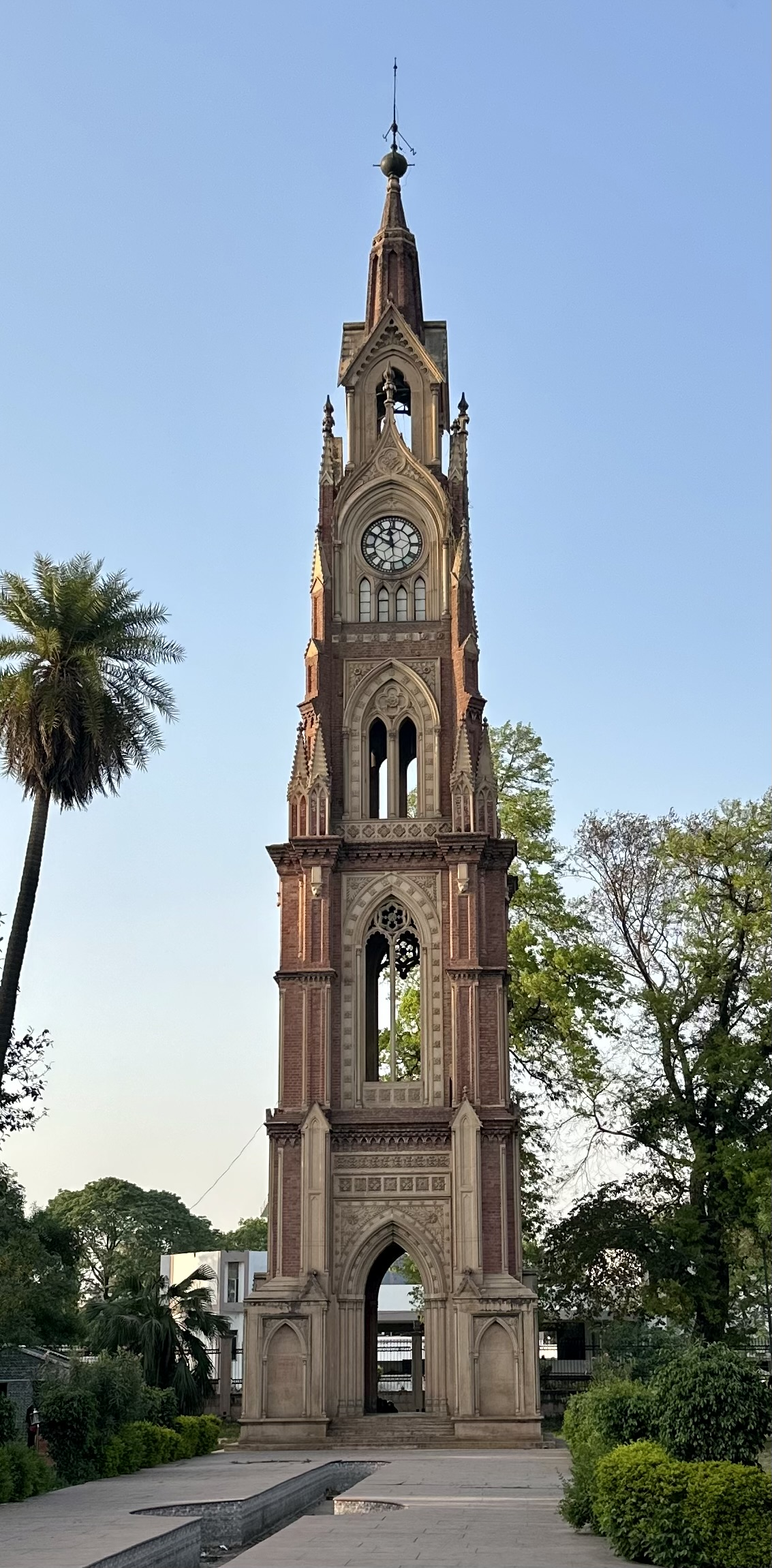
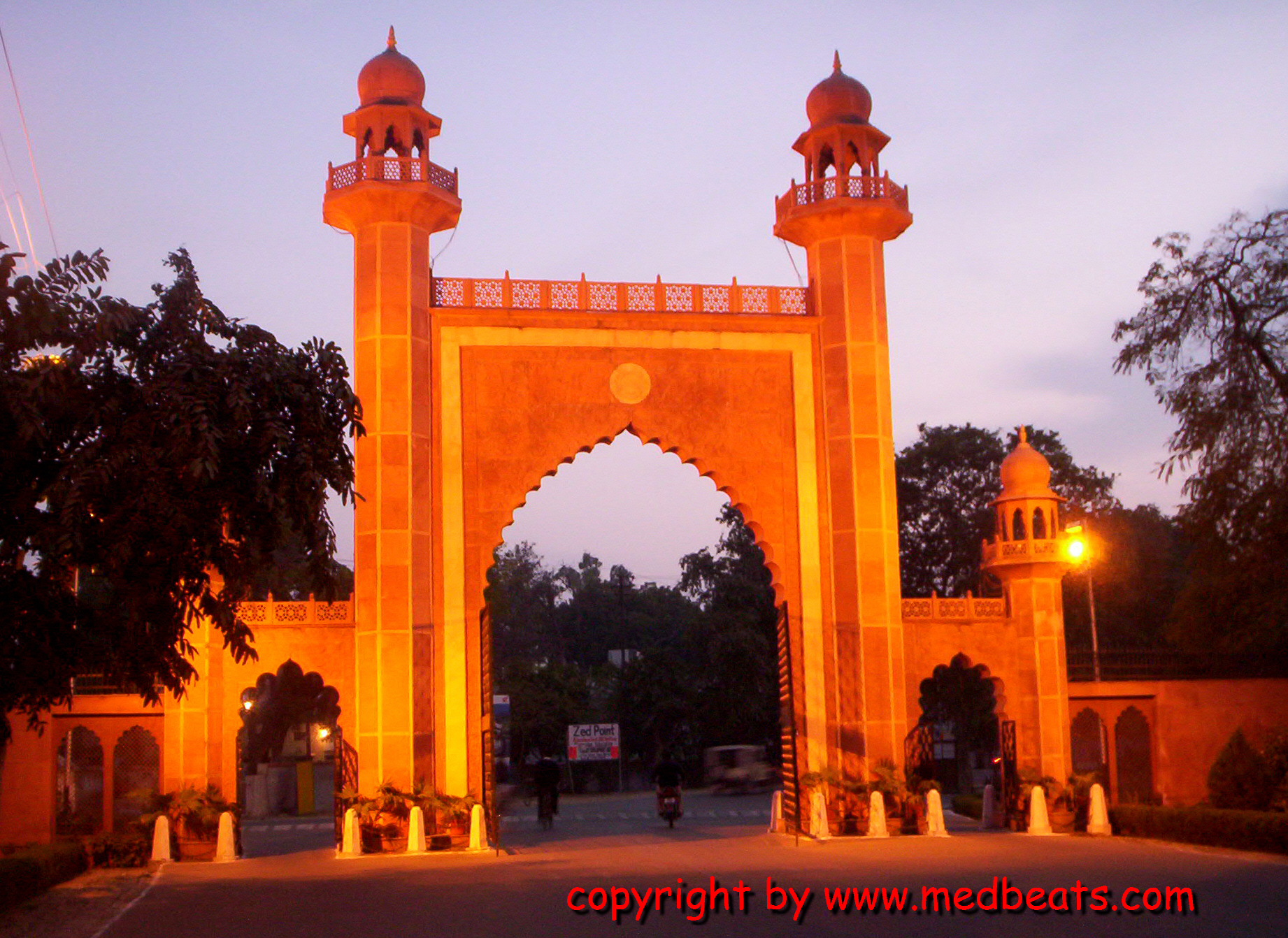
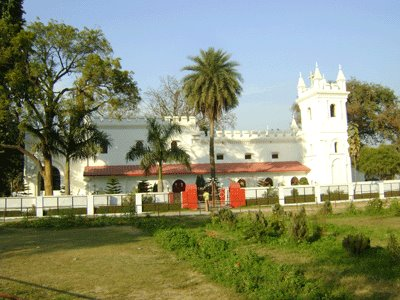
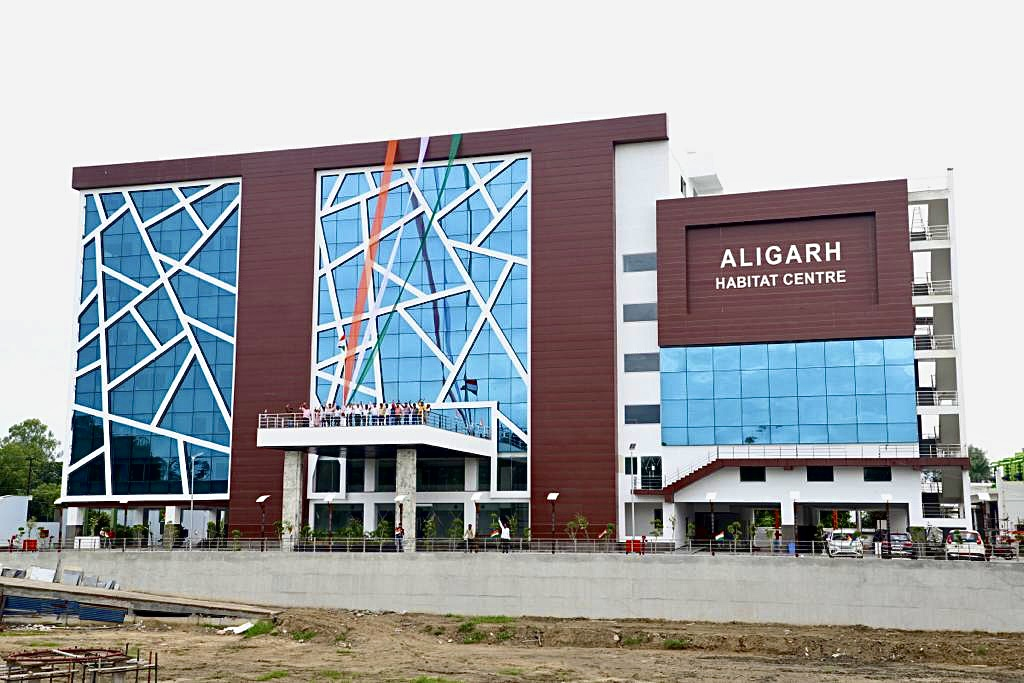
- From top, left to right: Sir Syed Mosque; Aligarh Clock Tower; Bab-e-Syed, Church of Ascension; Aligarh Habitat Centre; Kennedy House Complex

- Location in Uttar Pradesh, India Aligarh (India)
- Coordinates: 27°53′18″N 78°04′23″E
- Country: India
- State: Uttar Pradesh
- Division: Aligarh
- District: Aligarh
- Established: 1753 as Aligarh

Government
  - Type: Municipal Corporation
  - Body: Aligarh Municipal Corporation
  - Mayor: Prashant Singhal (BJP)
- Elevation: 178 m (584 ft)

Population (2011)
  - Total: 874,408
  - Rank: 53
- Demonym: Aligarian

Language
  - Official: Hindi
  - Additional official: Urdu
  - Regional: Braj Bhasha
- Time zone: UTC+5:30 (IST)
- PIN Code: 202001, 202002
- Telephone code: 0571
- Vehicle registration: UP-81
- Website: aligarh.nic.in

Aligarh (Hindi pronunciation: [əliːgəɽʱ]; formerly known as Koil) is a city in the state of Uttar Pradesh, India. It is the administrative headquarters of Aligarh district and lies 342 kilometres (213 mi) northwest of state capital Lucknow and approximately 130 kilometres (81 mi) southeast of the capital, New Delhi. The cities and districts which adjoin Aligarh are: Gautam Buddha Nagar, Bulandshahr, Sambhal, Badaun, Kasganj, Hathras, Etah and Mathura, as well as Palwal district of Haryana. As of 2011, Aligarh is the 53rd most populous city in India.

The recorded history of Aligarh begins in the 12th century, under the name Kol. Kol was a major city of the Delhi Sultanate and Mughal Empire, serving as both a political and economic centre. Beginning with a major rebuilding of the Aligarh Fort in the 16th century, the city was renamed several times before eventually settling on the current name, Aligarh, in the mid-1700s. It is notable as the seat of Aligarh Muslim University, which was founded here as Mohammadan Anglo-Oriental College in 1875, initiating the Aligarh Movement.

== History ==
Written references to the city commence only from 12th century onward; however, archaeological records suggest that the town used to be inhabited by Jains. The area of Aligarh before the Ghurid conquest of the region was under the sway of Dor Rajputs in 12th century.

In 1194, Qutb-ud-din Aibak mounted a successful invasion of the region and Hisam-ud-din Ulbak was installed as the first Muslim governor; court-historian Hasan Nizami noted Kol to be "one of the most celebrated fortresses of Hind". Beginning the 13th century, the place featured — as Kol or Koil — in multiple Persian (as well as non-Persian) Sultanate sources as a centre of economic prominence, especially for production of distilled wine.By the mid-13th century, the town commanded enough importance for (would-be Sultan) Ghiyas ud din Balban to erect a minaret.

Under the Khiljis and Tughlaqs, the prominence continued unabated; it had become an Iqta by the times of Alauddin Khalji.

=== Battle of Aligarh (1803) ===
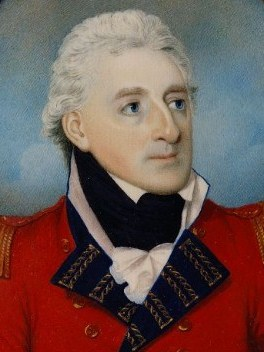
General Lord Gerard Lake who oversaw the Siege of Aligarh

The Battle of Aligarh was fought on 1 September 1803 during the Second Anglo-Maratha War (1803–1805) at Aligarh Fort. The British 76th Regiment, now known as the Duke of Wellington's Regiment besieged the fort, which was under the control of the French officer Perron, and established British rule. In 1804, the Aligarh district was formed by the union of the second, third and fourth British divisions with the addition of Anupshahr from Muradabad and Sikandra Rao from Etawa. On 1 August 1804, Claude Russell was appointed the first Collector of the new district.

== Administration ==
The Municipal Board of Aligarh was established on 1 August 1885. On 1 April 1893, the first Board of the Municipality was formally constituted, and the then District Magistrate, Mr. J.M. Harrison, took charge as Chairman. Nawab Abdul Samad Khan was elected as the first Chairman of Indian origin, and he held the post of Chairman from 1 June 1921 to 31 March 1923. From 1923 to 1952, various persons were elected to the post of Chairman of the Municipal Board. From 22 September 1952 to 6 February 1989, the Municipal Board remained without an elected board, and during this period the District Magistrate functioned as Administrator. In 1989, after a long gap of 27 years, elections to the Municipal Board were held, and on 7 February 1989 Mr. O.P. Agrawal assumed charge as President of the Municipal Board. From the day of the Municipality's establishment up to this point, 33 Chairmen had been elected. After the formation of the Municipal Corporation, after enactment of Uttar Pradesh Municipal Corporation Act 1959 in November 1994, Mr. Gangadin Yadav, the District Magistrate, took charge as the first Administrator of the Municipal Corporation. The Municipal Board building situated at Barahdwari was constructed in the year 1891. Even after the formation of the Municipal Corporation in November 1994, the Corporation continued to operate from the Barahdwari office until January 2001. After that, the office functioned under a tin shed in the Municipal Corporation's store located at Lal Diggi. Then, in 2003, a new building of the Municipal Corporation, named 'Seva Bhawan', was constructed, and the Corporation was shifted there on 5 July 2003. Since then, the Municipal Corporation has been operating from Civil Lines.

There are 90 wards under the Aligarh Municipal Corporation. Shri Prem Prakash Meena, IAS is the Commissioner and Shri Amit Kumar Singh is the Deputy Commissioner of the Corporation.

The departments under the Aligarh Municipal Corporation are - Accounts, Municipal Property, Property Tax, Establishment, Engineering, Jal Kal, Health.

There are various national level programmes implemented in Aligarh such as Smart cities, PM SVANidhi, PMAY-U, Swachh Bharat Mission, AMRUT 2.0.

Aligarh district is divided into five tehsils, namely Kol Tehsil, Khair Tehsil, Atrauli, Gabhana and Iglas. These tehsils are further divided into 12 blocks.

The city is administered by Nagar Nigam Aligarh (Municipal Corporation), which is responsible for performing civic administrative functions administered by Mayor and Municipal Commissioner (PCS Officer). Infrastructure development of the city is looked after by the Aligarh Development Authority (ADA) administered by Divisional Commissioner (chairman) and vice-chairman (PCS Officer).

The Uttar Pradesh Municipal Corporation Act-1959 is the Municipal Act under which the city is administered. AMC covers an area of 40 km².

Aligarh division has four districts : Aligarh, Hathras, Kasganj and Etah.

Aligarh is the headquarters of Aligarh Police Range and Aligarh Division.

As per the Ministry of Housing and Urban Affairs, the Aligarh Municipal Corporation reported a revenue of ₹365 crore and an expenditure of ₹257 crore in 2022–23. Taxes contributed to 35.1% of the revenue, with 64.9% of the income coming from other sources.

== Demographics ==
Religions in Aligarh city (2011)
Religion	Percent
Hinduism	55.36%
Islam	42.64%
Christianity	0.53%
Other or not stated	0.47%
Distribution of religions

According to the 2011 Census, Aligarh has a total population of 874,408, of which 461,772 are males and 412,636 are females. Population in the age range 0–6 years is 119,543. The literacy rate is 59.15%, of which the male literacy rate is 63.42% and female literacy rate is 54.37%. The effective literacy rate of 7+ population of Aligarh was 68.5%, of which male literacy rate was 62.9% and the female literacy rate was 70.8%. The Scheduled Castes and Scheduled Tribes have a population of 138,184 and 332 respectively. There were 147,363 households in Aligarh as of 2011. The city lies in the cultural region of Braj.

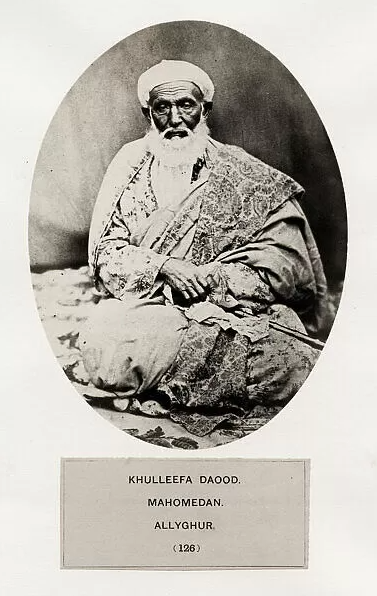
Sunni Muslim, Aligarh

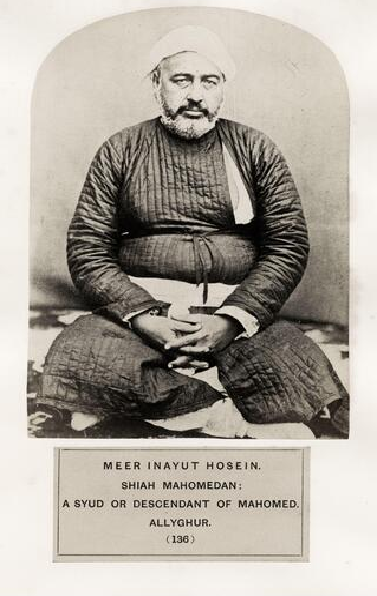
Shia Muslim, Aligarh
Languages in Aligarh (2011)
1. Hindi (81.5%)
2. Urdu (17.2%)
3. Others (1.20%)

Hindi is the most spoken language. Urdu is the second-largest language.

== Geography ==
=== Location ===
Aligarh is located at the coordinates 27.88°N 78.08°E. It has an elevation of approximately 178 metres (587 feet). The city is in the middle portion of the doab, the land between the Ganges and the Yamuna rivers. The Grand Trunk Road passes through it via NH-91 is 134 km from capital of India.

== Climate ==
Aligarh has a hot semi-arid climate (Köppen BSh) a little too dry to be a monsoon-influenced humid subtropical climate (Cwa). Summers start in April and are hot with temperatures peaking in May. The average temperature range is 28–38 °C (82–100 °F). The monsoon season starts in late June, continuing until early October, bringing high humidity. Aligarh gets most of its annual rainfall of 800 millimetres (31 in) during these months. Temperatures then decrease, and winter sets in December, and continues until February. Temperatures range between 2–11 °C (36–52 °F). Winters in Aligarh are generally mild, but 2011–12 experienced the lowest temperature of 1 °C. The fog and cold snaps are extreme.

Climate data for Aligarh (1991–2020, extremes 1932–2011)
Month	Jan	Feb	Mar	Apr	May	Jun	Jul	Aug	Sep	Oct	Nov	Dec	Year
Record high °C (°F)	30.7 (87.3)	33.3 (91.9)	41.7 (107.1)	44.8 (112.6)	47.5 (117.5)	46.7 (116.1)	44.5 (112.1)	42.1 (107.8)	40.2 (104.4)	41.7 (107.1)	36.1 (97.0)	32.8 (91.0)	47.5 (117.5)
Mean daily maximum °C (°F)	19.1 (66.4)	23.5 (74.3)	30.2 (86.4)	37.1 (98.8)	40.2 (104.4)	38.6 (101.5)	34.9 (94.8)	33.2 (91.8)	33.3 (91.9)	32.8 (91.0)	27.5 (81.5)	22.0 (71.6)	31.1 (88.0)
Mean daily minimum °C (°F)	7.3 (45.1)	10.4 (50.7)	15.0 (59.0)	20.5 (68.9)	24.6 (76.3)	26.5 (79.7)	26.2 (79.2)	25.5 (77.9)	23.9 (75.0)	19.2 (66.6)	13.2 (55.8)	8.6 (47.5)	18.4 (65.1)
Record low °C (°F)	0.0 (32.0)	1.7 (35.1)	3.9 (39.0)	10.9 (51.6)	15.5 (59.9)	18.6 (65.5)	19.9 (67.8)	19.9 (67.8)	14.8 (58.6)	11.0 (51.8)	2.9 (37.2)	1.2 (34.2)	0.0 (32.0)
Average rainfall mm (inches)	15.2 (0.60)	16.5 (0.65)	10.4 (0.41)	12.0 (0.47)	27.2 (1.07)	66.2 (2.61)	217.7 (8.57)	216.3 (8.52)	107.7 (4.24)	17.2 (0.68)	2.7 (0.11)	3.7 (0.15)	712.8 (28.06)
Average rainy days	1.4	1.4	1.3	1.0	2.7	4.0	9.3	10.3	5.5	1.0	0.3	0.4	38.6
Average relative humidity (%) (at 17:30 IST)	66	57	46	33	34	48	68	75	67	52	57	62	72
Source: India Meteorological Department

== Economy ==
The city is an agricultural trade centre. Agricultural product processing and manufacturing are important.

Aligarh is an important business centre of Uttar Pradesh and is most famous for its lock industry. Aligarh locks are exported across the world. In 1870, Johnson & Co. was the first English lock firm in Aligarh. In 1890, the company initiated production of locks on a small scale here.

Aligarh is famous for its brass hardware and sculptures. The city has many manufacturers, exporters, and suppliers involved in the brass, bronze, iron and aluminium industries.

Indian Diecasting Industries which manufactures aluminium and zinc die-casting parts is located at Sasni Gate in Aligarh.

Harduaganj Thermal Power Station (also referred as Kasimpur Power House) is 15 km from the city. Narora Atomic Power Station is located 50 km from Aligarh.

Some of the companies located in Aligarh include Birla Sun Life Insurance, Agarwal Scale Corporations, Guptal Sales Corporation, A.M. Buckles & A. M. Trading Company Pvt. Ltd, Phoenix Techno Vision, Manish International, Site Kreation, Manda Infosoft, Tetrissoft Website Designing, Saveraa Insurance Company, Shivam Enterprises, S.S.C. Finance Ltd, Sundaram Finance Group, Ganga Vidhya Finance Pvt Ltd, LIC Housing Finance Ltd, DEV Finance Service, Magma Fincorp Ltd, Shriram Transport Finance Company Ltd, Zeengal Info Solutions, Hexa Global Systems, Bhartiy Web Technology, ML Image Perfect Concepts Pvt Ltd, ICICI Lombard General Insurance Company Ltd, Bajaj Allianz Life Insurance Company Ltd, Baljiwan Medicines Pvt. Ltd, and Swaroop Pharmaceuticals Pvt Ltd.

== Education ==
=== Universities and colleges ===
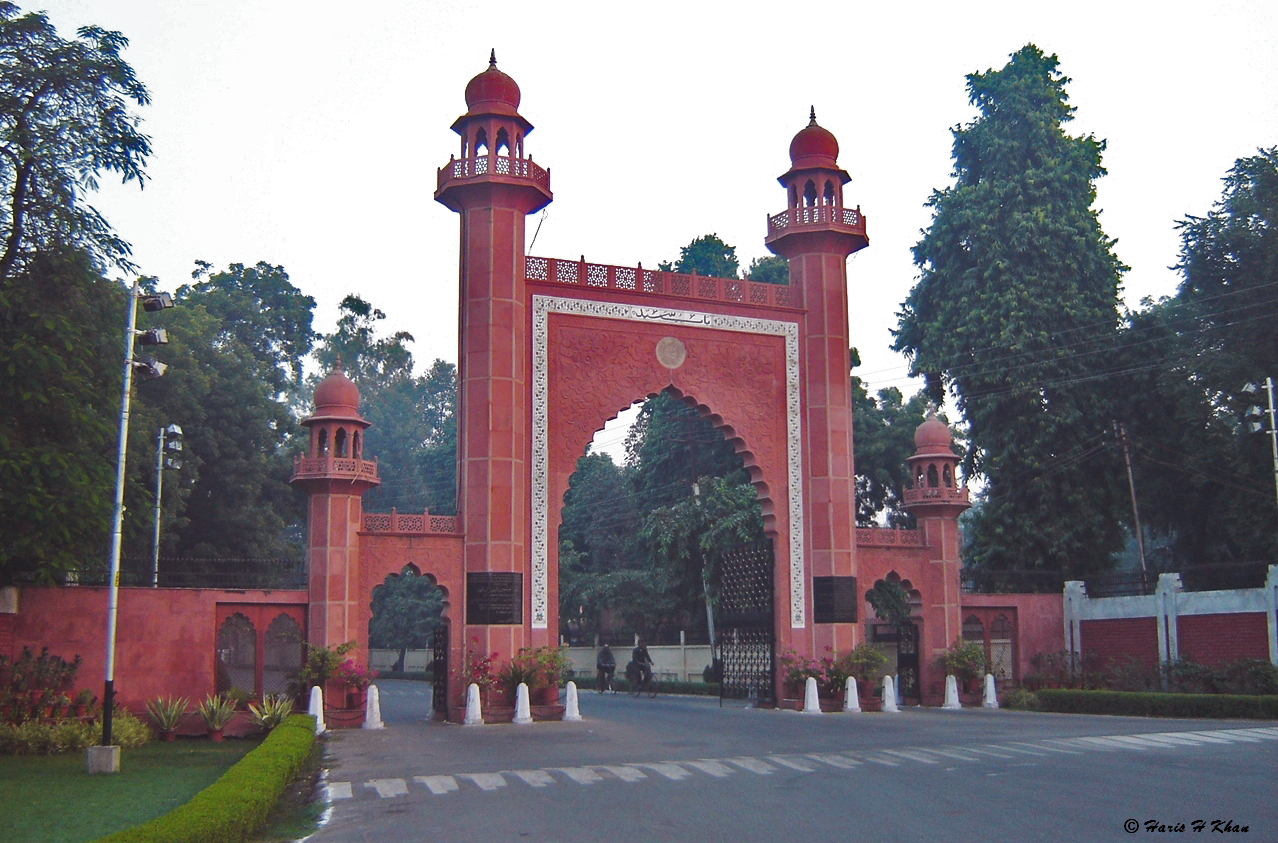
The main entrance gate of Aligarh Muslim University, founded and centralised in 1920.

- Aligarh Muslim University
- Ibn Sina Academy of Medieval Medicine and Sciences
- Mangalayatan University

=== Schools ===
- Our Lady of Fatima Senior Secondary School, Aligarh
- STS School

== Art and craft ==
Aligarh is associated with an applique and embroidery art known as phool patti ka kaam.

== Locations ==
=== Cultural landmarks ===
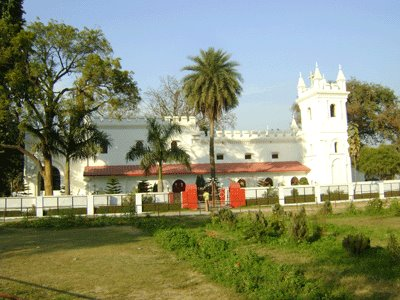
Church of Ascension

Aligarh has several popular landmarks. Most notable few of them are Aligarh Fort, Jama Masjid, Khereshwar Temple which is the birthplace of Swami Shri Haridas Ji, Dor fortress (1524), which is now in ruins, lies at the city's centre, its site is in the area now called Upper Fort (Balai Qila) and is occupied by an 18th-century mosque. The area Shah Jamal is very famous for a Sufi saint Syed Shah Jamal is also known as Shamsul Arifeen, of whom the tomb is located at Shahjamal area and surrounded by a graveyard. The Sufi Saint is mentioned by Ibn Battuta in his book The Travels of Ibn Battuta. The saint is said to be of Sufi Chishtiya order.

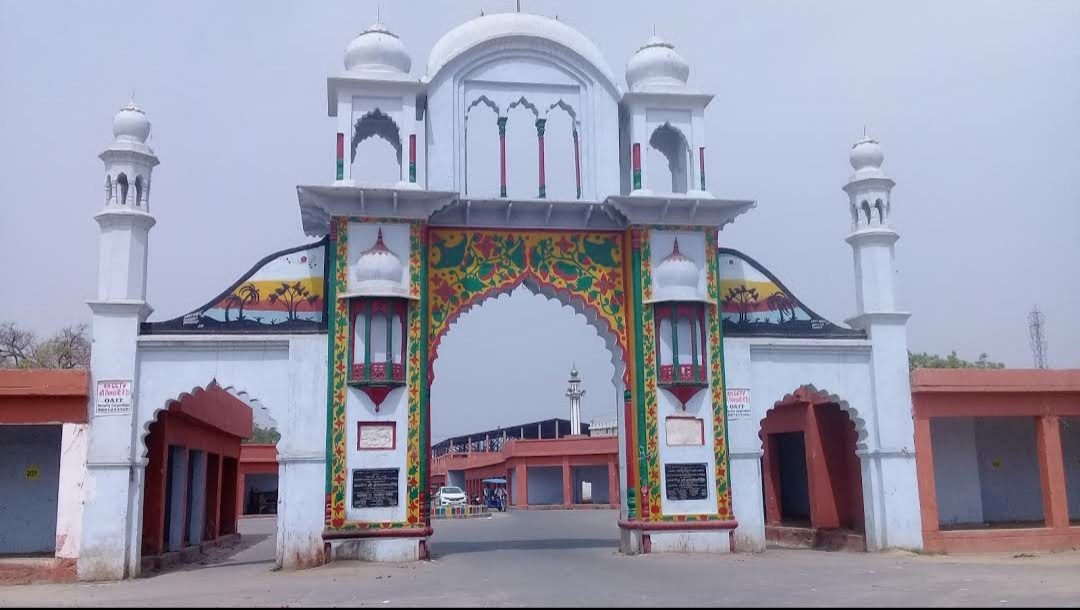
Aligarh Numaish Ground

The Annual Cultural Exhibition, popularly known as Numaish, is held at the exhibition ground in January and February. The land Numaish Ground was donated by Nawab Rehmat Ullah Khan Sherwani. The cultural shows take place at three grand stages (Kohinoor, Krishnanjali and Muktakash). In all, more than 150 stage events featuring artists from across India take place during a period of 28–30 days.

== Historical places ==
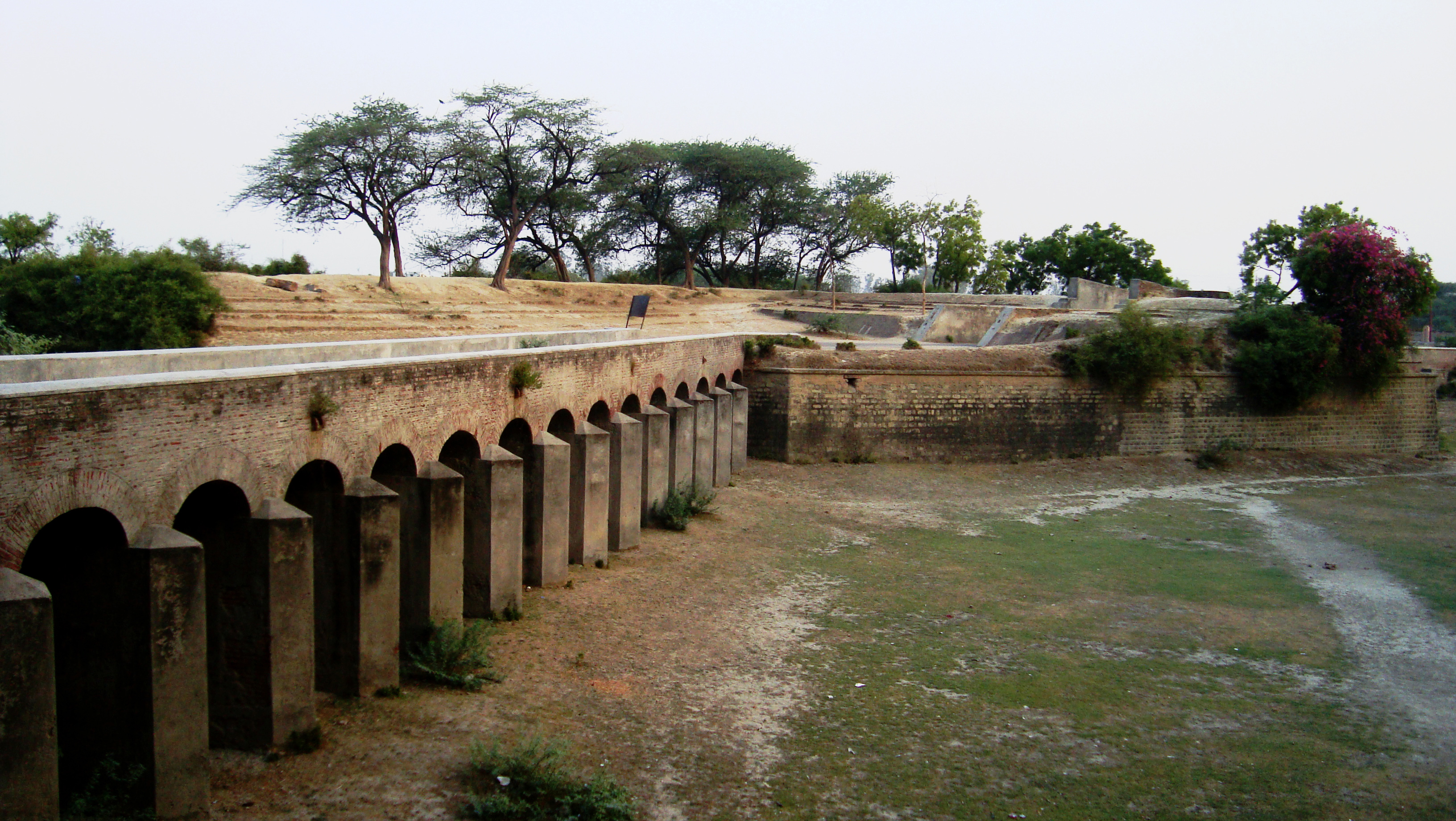
Aligarh Fort

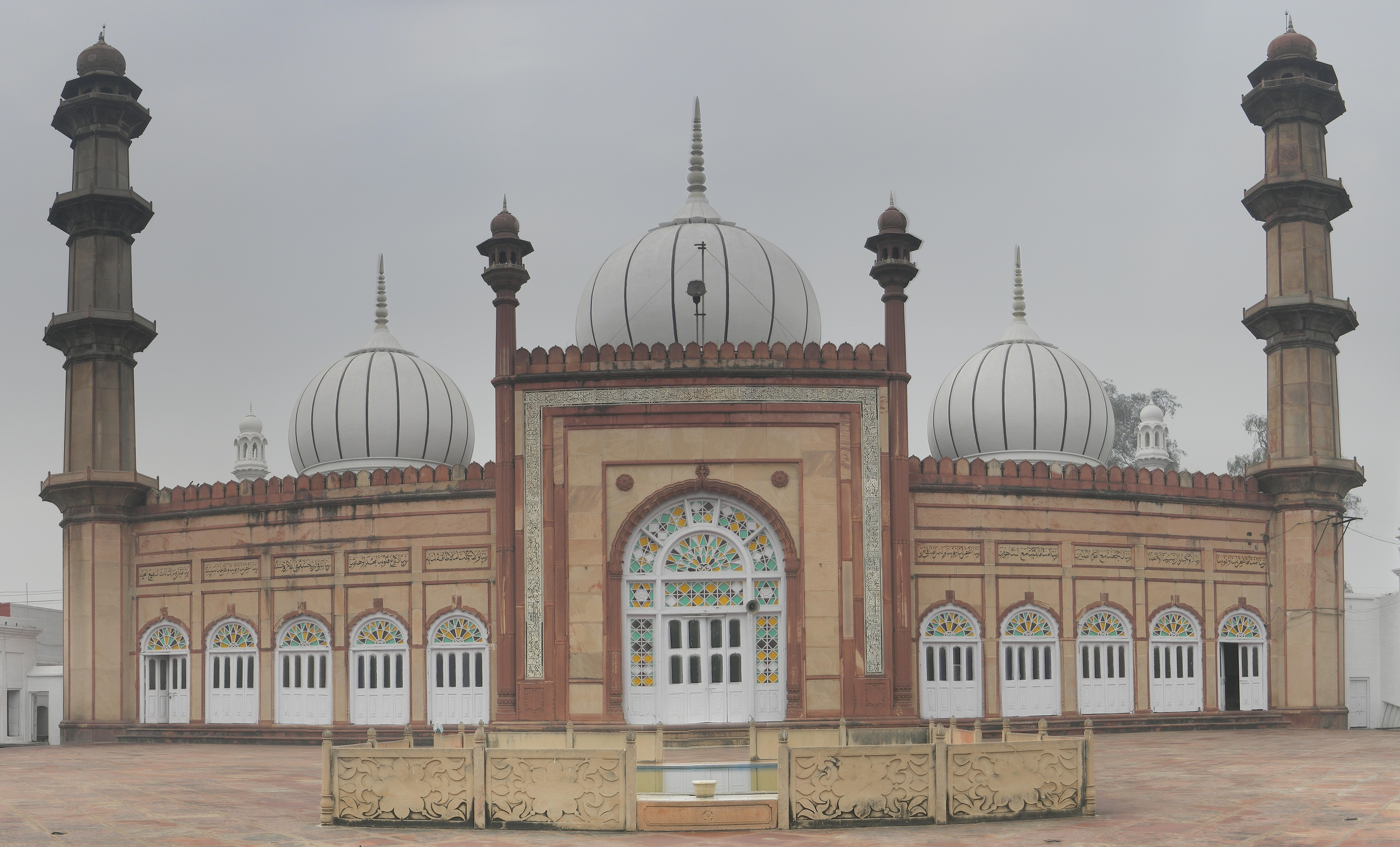
Sir Syed Mosque beside Strachey Hall, Aligarh Muslim University

- Shekha Jheel, Bird Sanctuary
- Maulana Azad Library, AMU (Estd 1875)
- Sir Syed Masjid in Aligarh Muslim University's campus

=== Aligarh Muslim University ===
Aligarh Muslim University (AMU) is one of the oldest central universities. It was established by Sir Syed Ahmed Khan as Madrasatul Uloom Musalmanan-e-Hind in 1875–78 which later became Mohammedan Anglo-Oriental College (MAO College). It was designed to train Muslims for government services in India and prepare them for advanced training in British universities. The Mohammedan Anglo-Oriental College became Aligarh Muslim University in 1920. It is famous for its Law, Medical, and Engineering courses.

=== Museums ===
Ibn Sina Academy of Medieval Medicine and Sciences maintains 'Museum on History of Medicine and Sciences' and 'Museum on Arts, Culture and Orientalism'. It was established by a family Hakim Syed Zillur Rahman and Syed Ziaur Rahman at the heart of the city and near a busy market of Dodhpur.

== Transport ==
=== By rail ===
Aligarh Junction railway station is the primary station for Aligarh city and is a major stop on the Delhi-Kolkata route. It is an A-Class railway station, and is one of the oldest ones on this route. It connects Aligarh to the states of West Bengal, Odisha, Bihar, Jharkhand, north-east, and most of Uttar Pradesh, and important stations of cities such as New Delhi railway station, Mumbai Central, Kolkata, Bhopal Junction railway station, Indore, Jammu, Gwalior, Lucknow, Jhansi, Puri, Kanpur Central railway station, Etawah Junction railway station, Tundla Junction railway station, Agra Cantonment railway station and Varanasi. Aligarh railway station handles over 136 trains daily (in both directions) and serves around 204,000 passengers every day. Aligarh has one branch railway line to Bareilly.

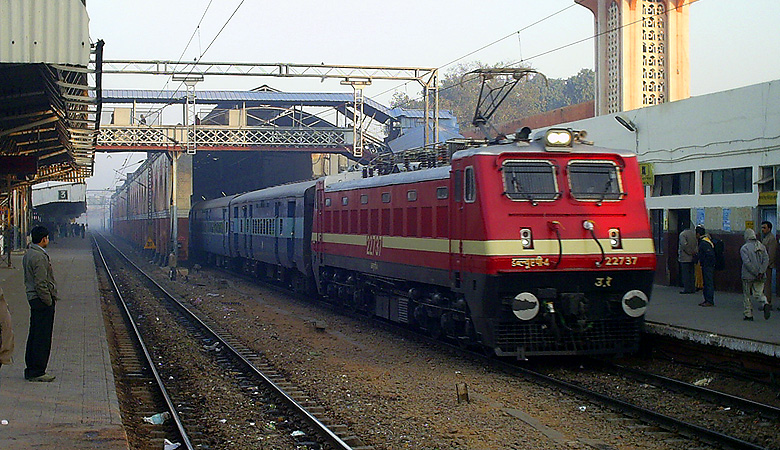
Aligarh Junction railway station

Aligarh City has following railway stations:

- Aligarh Junction: an A-Class railway station
- Somna (Gabhana) railway station
- Mahrawal railway station
- Kalua railway station
- Daudkhan railway station
- Mandrak railway station
- Harduaganj railway station (Satha, near Kasimpur Power House Colony)
- Manjoorgarhi railway station (Chherat)

=== By road ===
Aligarh is 140 km from New Delhi. It is one of the Division of Uttar Pradesh State Road Transport Corporation(UPSRTC). UPSRTC buses serve cities all over the state and cities in Uttarakhand, Rajasthan, Madhya Pradesh and Haryana.

Aligarh City has three UPSRTC bus stations:

- Aligarh Depot (Old Bus Station/Gandhi Park Bus Station) bus station
- Masoodabad (est. 2000) (Budh Vihar Bus Station/New Bus Station/Workshop Bus Station/Raghuveerpuri Bus Station/Mathura Bus Station)
- Depot bus station(non-functional from 2018 to 2021) (now functioning since 2021 post renovation into a well facilitated Bus Station)
- Aligarh Satellite Bus Stand(New Bus Station/Sootmill Bus Station/Sarsaul Bus Station)(functioning since 2018 due to sudden non-functioning of Masoodabaad Bus Station during 2018-2021 period)

There are buses plying from Aligarh to Delhi at frequent intervals via

1) Khair, Tappal, Palval, Faridabad, Delhi - The route is under construction between Khair and Palval and should be strictly avoided by cars. No toll charges.

2) Khair, Tappal, Yamuna expressway, Noida, Greater Noida, Delhi, Gurgaon - Best and recommended route for Delhi, Noida, Gurgaon. Toll Charges are ₹120 between Aligarh and Delhi.

3) Old GT Road, Bulandshahr, Ghaziabad, Delhi - NH 91 - It is a 6-lane highway. Toll charges are ₹285.

Following Highways are connected to Aligarh:

- National Highway 91 - It connects Kolkata to national capital New Delhi. Ghaziabad-Bulandshahr-Aligarh section is a 6-Lane Highway.
- National Highway 93 - It connects Moradabad to Taj Nagri Agra via Aligarh. Aligarh-Agra section is constructed as Brijbhoomi Expressway.
- Yamuna Expressway - It is a 6-Lane Expressway connecting Greater Noida with Agra.

Aligarh City has Mahanagar Bus Service (City Bus Service) which provides local transport to Aligarh.

- Route-1 J N Medical College-Uperkot
- Route-2 Gandhi Park-Sarsaul/Sootmill
- Route-3 Ghantabagh-Quarsi
- Route-4 Gandhi Park-Boner
- Route-5 Etah Chungi-Collectrate

Apart from this an Air-conditioned Electronic Bus Service has been running within the city since January 2022.

=== By air ===
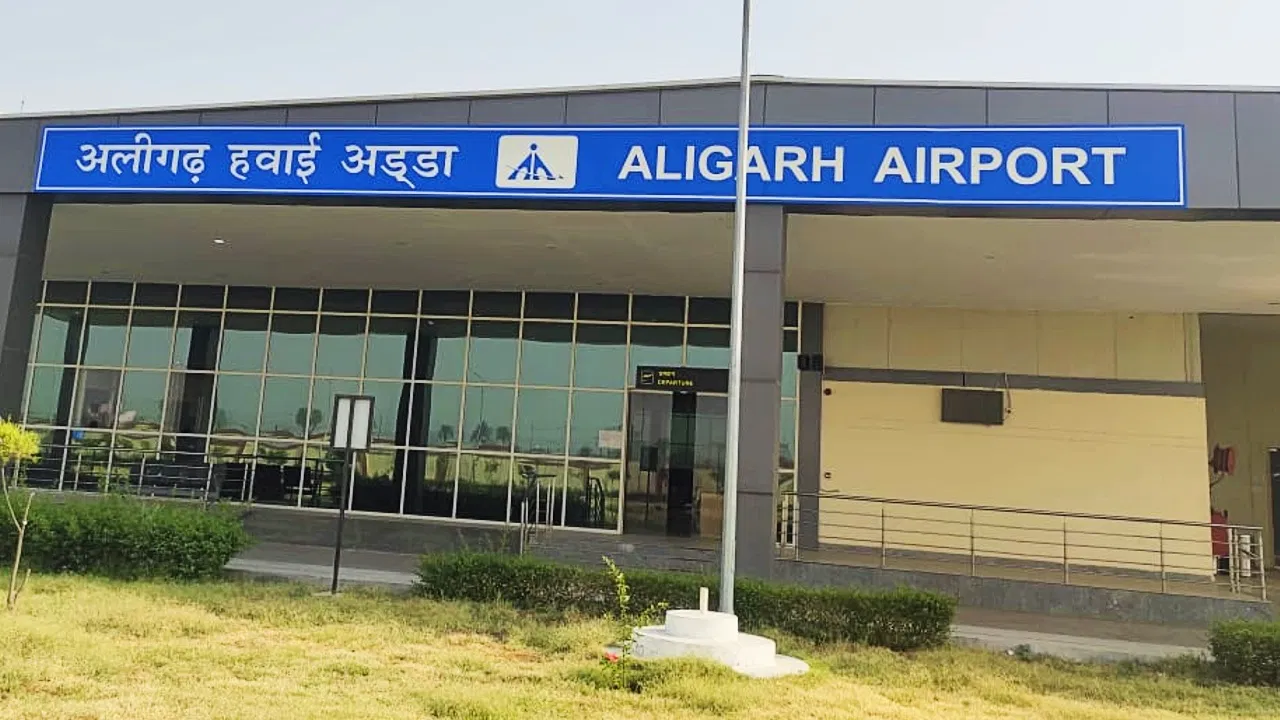
Aligarh Airport

Aligarh Airport, Situated on NH 91, Dhanipur, Aligarh, Uttar Pradesh. It is Also known as Dhanipur Air Strip/Dhanipur Hawai Patti. This airport is also used as flying Club. The Government of Uttar Pradesh signed a memorandum of understanding with the Airports Authority of India in February 2014 for the development of the airport.

At this time direct flight started by the regional airline Flybig from Lucknow to Aligarh and vice versa under the RCS-UDAN scheme.

The nearest international airport from Aligarh is Indira Gandhi International Airport, New Delhi. It is 140 km from Aligarh. Another nearest airport from Aligarh (65 km) will be Noida International Airport.

Another airport located close to Aligarh is Agra Airport in Agra. It is about 98 kilometres from Aligarh.

== Notable people ==
=== Businessmen and entrepreneurs ===
- Sheela Gautam, founder of Sheela Foam Limited-Sleepwell
- Vijay Shekhar Sharma, founder of Paytm
- Khwaja Abdul Hamied, Pharmacist, founder of Cipla

=== Educationalists ===
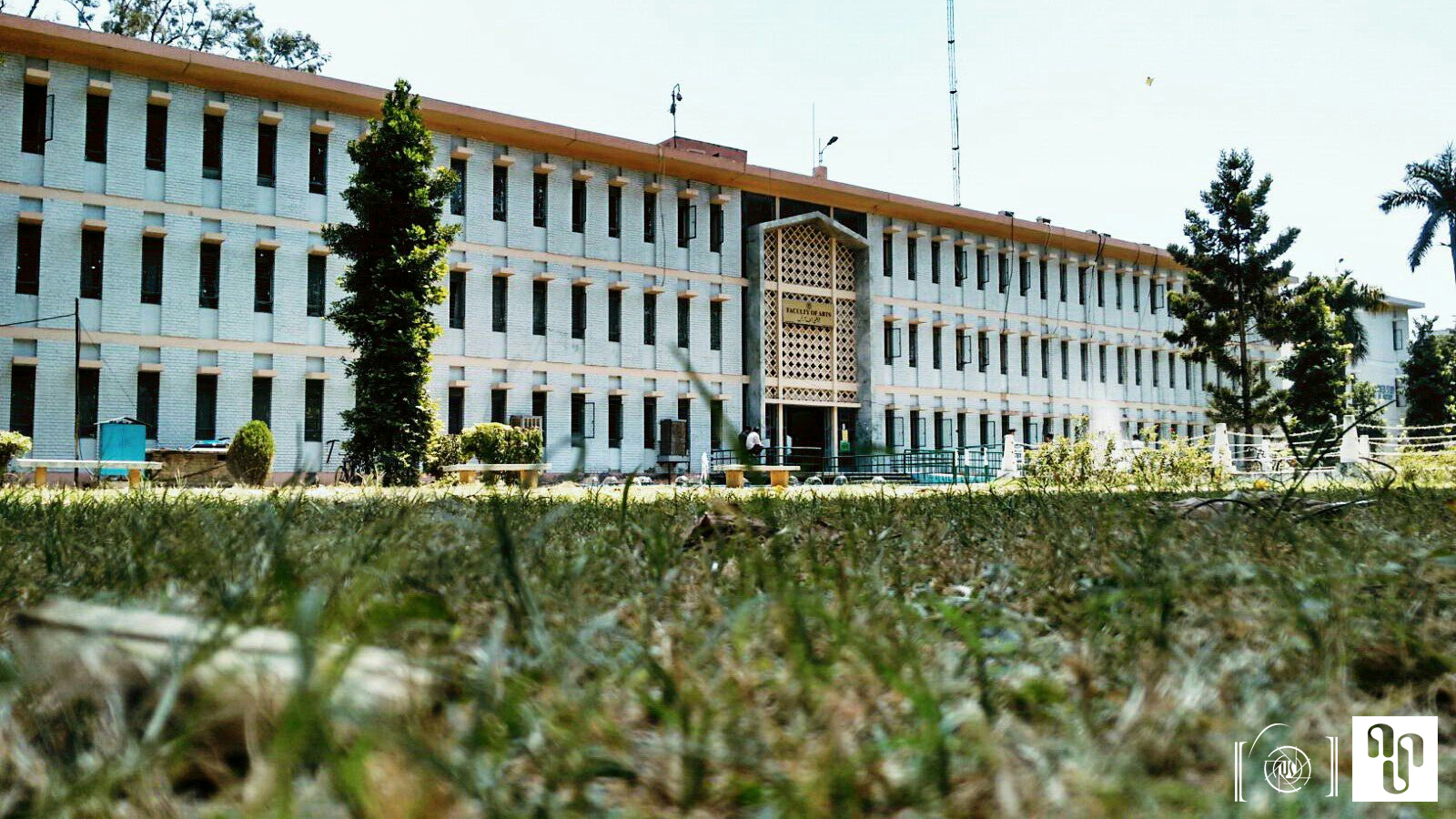
Faculty of Arts, Aligarh Muslim University

- Ziauddin Ahmad, mathematician, M.L.A. (Central), Vice-Chancellor of Aligarh Muslim University Movement. He established several institution including J.N. Medical College
- Roshan Ara Bokhari, dancer, choreographer and dance teacher
- Masud Husain Khan, linguist, the fifth Vice-Chancellor of Jamia Millia Islamia and the first Professor Emeritus in Social Sciences at Aligarh Muslim University
- Syed Ahmad Khan, founder of Aligarh Muslim University
- Shafey Kidwai, academic, bilingual critic, translator, columnist, author, professor in the Department of Mass Communications at Aligarh Muslim University

=== Writers, poets and publishers ===
- A.R. Akela, Dalit author and publisher, owner of "Anand Sahitya Sadan
- Syed Amin Ashraf, Urdu poet and professor of English at AMU
- Qurratulain Hyder, Padma Bhushan, Urdu novelist, writer, and journalist
- Akhlaq Mohammed Khan, pen name Shaharyar, Urdu poet, Bollywood lyricist and served as Professor at Aligarh Muslim University
- Munshi Nawal Kishore, book publisher
- Jainendra Kumar, Hindi writer
- Gopaldas Neeraj, poet, recipient of Padma Bhushan
- Saghar Nizami, Urdu Poet
- Prem Kishore Patakha, Hindi Humorous Poet
- Maitreyi Pushpa, Hindi fiction writer
- Gafil Swami (born 1953), Hindi poet

=== Historians ===
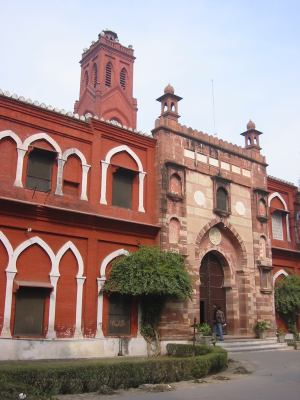
Victoria gate

- Irfan Habib, eminent Indian historian and Professor Emeritus at Aligarh Muslim University
- Mohammad Habib (1895–1971), noted Indian historian and served as Professor Emeritus at Aligarh Muslim University

=== Film actors ===
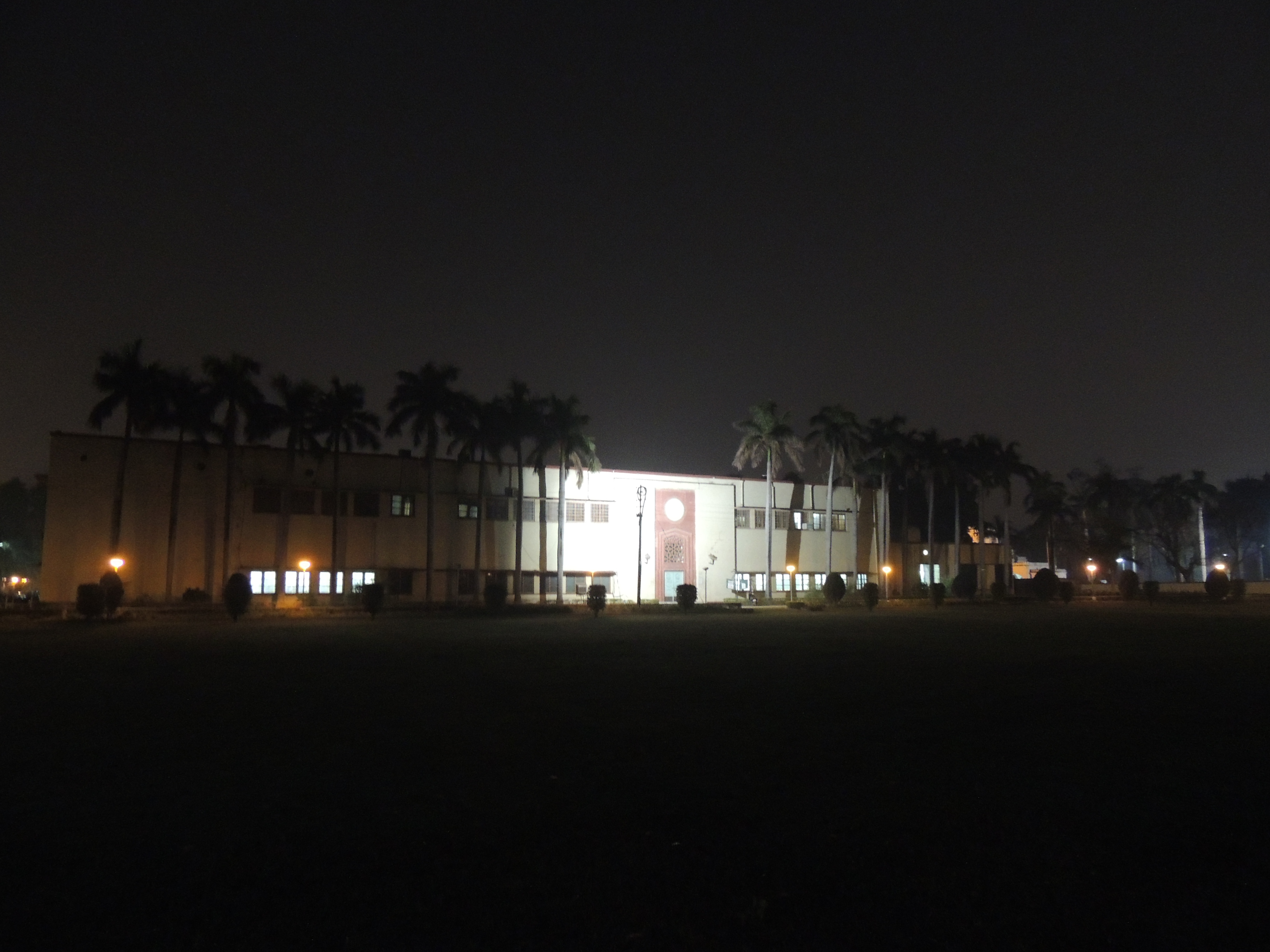
ZHCET's View at Night

- Shamim Ara, Pakistani film actress
- Pooja Banerjee, Indian television actress
- Bharat Bhushan, Bollywood actor
- Aadesh Chaudhary, Indian television actor
- Nitin Chauhaan, Indian television actor
- Ravindra Jain, Bollywood music director
- Kanika Maheshwari, Indian television actress
- Neena, Hindi and Urdu film actress
- Alka Nupur, former actress, kathak dancer
- Chandrachur Singh, Bollywood actor
- Hasan Zaidi, Indian television actor
- Zarina, Indian artist

=== Sports persons ===
- Piyush Chawla, Indian cricketer
- Zafar Iqbal, Former hockey captain of India
- Annu Raj Singh, international shooter
- Rinku Singh, Indian Cricketer

=== Politicians ===
- Mukta Raja, MLA of Aligarh
- Zafar Alam ex-MLA from Aligarh (Assembly constituency)
- Dalbir Singh Chaudhary, MLA from Baruli vidhansabha constituency
- Mohammad Furqan, Former mayor of Aligarh
- Satish Kumar Gautam, MP from Aligarh (Lok Sabha constituency)
- Sheela Gautam, ex MP and ex chairperson of Sleepwell
- Zameer Ullah Khan ex MLA from Koil (Assembly constituency) and Aligarh (Assembly constituency)
- Jamal Khwaja, ex MP
- Sanjeev Raja, ex MLA
- Bijendra Singh, ex MP
- Chaudhary Sunil Singh, ex MLC
- Kalyan Singh, ex governor and ex Chief Minister of Uttar Pradesh
- Rajendra Singh, ex Agriculture and Irrigation Minister, Govt of Uttar Pradesh
- Sandeep Singh, MLA Atrauli, grandson of Kalyan Singh former Chief Minister of Uttar Pradesh
- Thakur Jaivir Singh, ex MLA (Now MLC)
- Roohi Zuberi, advocate

=== Medical professionals ===
- Khwaja Abdul Hamied, pharmacist, founder of Cipla (pharmaceutical company)
- Prerna Kohli, clinical psychologist, social worker and author
- Hakim Syed Zillur Rahman, Unani physician and author
- Syed Ziaur Rahman, pharmacologist, researcher and author
- Ashok Seth, an Indian interventional cardiologist

=== Social activists ===
- Javed Abidi, born with spina bifida, he was an activist working for the disabled community and served as the first director of the National Centre for Promotion of Employment for Disabled People (NCPEDP) and founded Disability Rights in India
- Jai Kishan Das, a close associate of Sir Syed Ahmad Khan
- Rajiv Dixit, Promotor of Yoga, Ayurveda and Swadeshi-economics

== See also ==
- Jamia Millia Islamia
