= Aligarh Fort =

Historic structure in Aligarh, Uttar Pradesh, India

Coordinates: 27.9301°N 78.0635°E

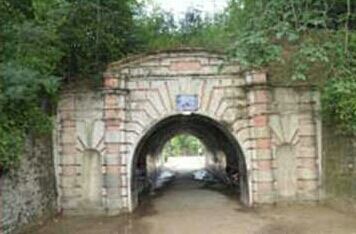
Moat at the Aligarh Fort

Aligarh Fort (Aligarh Qila) is a fort located in Aligarh, Uttar Pradesh, India. It is also called "Aligarh Qila". Most part of it is damaged and only ruins remain. The fort is situated near the Grand Trunk Road and consists of a regular polygon surrounded by a very broad and deep ditch.

== History ==
The fort was built during the time of Ibrahim Khan Lodi by Muhammad, son of Umar the governor of Kol (Aligarh city is subset of this greater set) in 1524–25. Sabit Khan, who was the governor of this region during the time of Farrukh Siyar and Muhammad Shah, rebuilt the fort. It became a fortress of great importance under Madhavrao I Scindia in 1759; it was the depot where he drilled and organized his battalions in European fashion with the aid of French soldier Benoît de Boigne. During the Battle of Ally Ghur in 1803, it was captured from the Marathas under the leadership of a French officer Perron by Lord Gerard Lake's British army. After that it was strengthened and improved. In the rebellion of 1857 the troops stationed at Aligarh mutinied, but abstained from murdering their officers, who, with the other residents and ladies and children, succeeded in reaching Hathras.

The fort is built on a small rise north of the Aligarh Muslim University at Barouli Road. It has steep ravines, over 30 feet high, on every side, and bastions in every angle on the walls. Currently, Aligarh fort is under the care of Aligarh Muslim University as a protected site of Archeological Survey of India. The university uses part of the internal area fort as location for its department of Botany. The fort has been the seat of many governors and other rulers of this land, including Sabit Khan, Maharaja Surajmal in 1753 and mentioned Madhavrao Scindia in 1759. The fort was expanded three times in 1753 by lieutenant Banasaur, commanding officer of contemporary ruler Maharaja Surajmal, to include a basement, an explosives warehouse and an air cooled kitchen.

Aligarh fort, as it stands today, is the work of the French engineers under the control of de Boigne and Perron. Presently, the fort houses a small primary school within its premises.

On its front side the new building of the Dawakhana Tibya college, Aligarh Muslim University Aligarh is situated. On its back side there is the Street Number 1 of the Fort Enclave (a posh colony of the university teachers). The back side ( south) of the fort is now identified by the office ( Arafaat, Street Number-1 Fort Enclave) of the National Society for Educational Empowerment of the Masses ( NASEEM) an NGO working particularly for Have-not sections of the locality. To protect the remains of this historic fort its out-boundaries were constructed [as per the 100 m rule of the (ASI)] by the Aligarh Muslim University Aligarh during the tenure of Mr. Mahmoodurrahman the vice chancellor of the varsity.

== See also ==
- 1803 Garhwal earthquake
- List of forts in Uttar Pradesh
