= Aligarh Clock Tower =

Clock tower in Aligarh, India

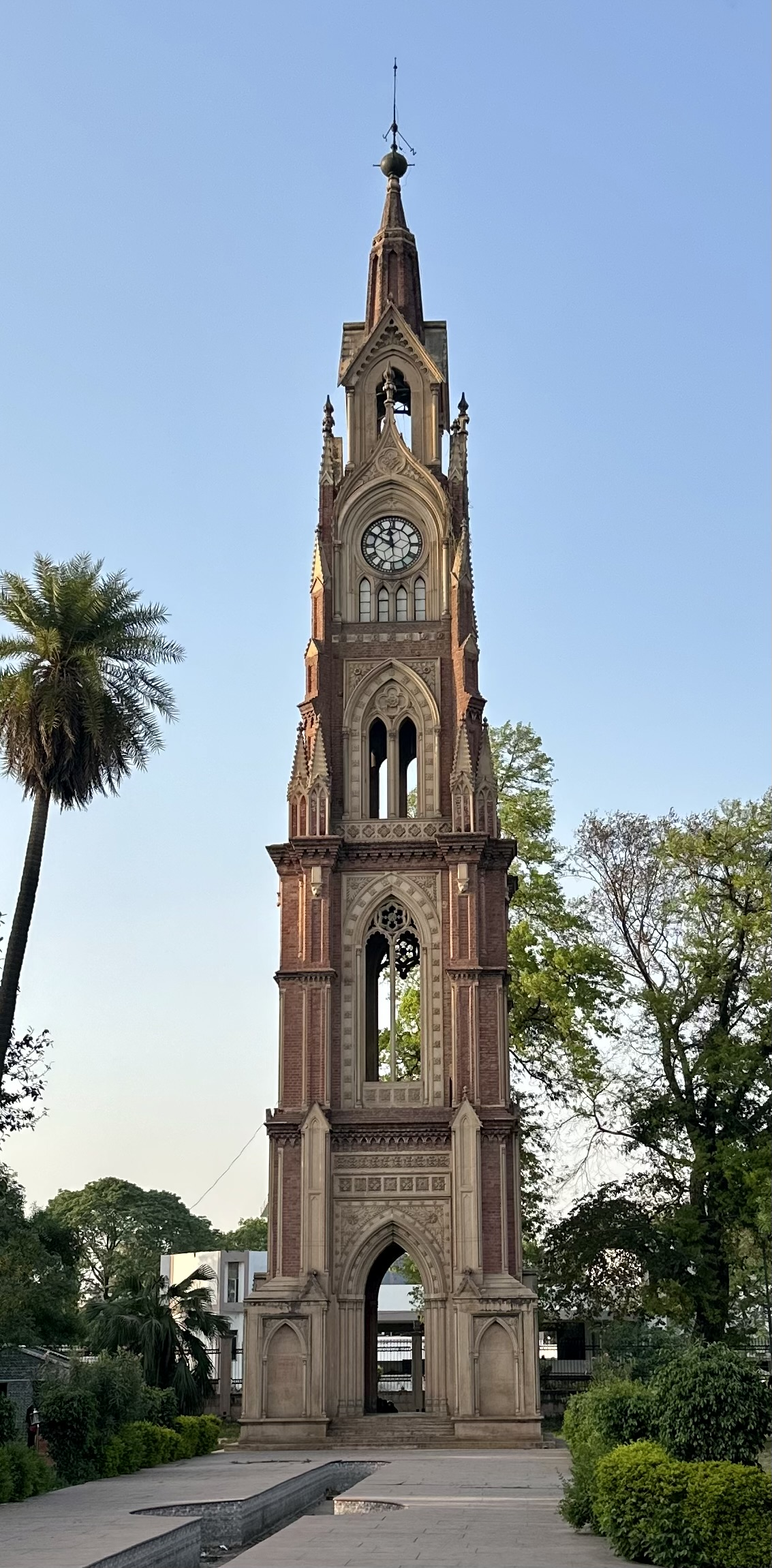
- Interactive map of the Aligarh Clock Tower area
- Alternative names: Harrison Tower

General information
- Location: Aligarh, Uttar Pradesh, India
- Coordinates: 27°53′44″N 78°04′26″E
- Completed: 1893

Technical details
- Floor count: Five

Aligarh Clock Tower, also known as the Harrison Tower, is a clock tower in Aligarh, India, situated near the Aligarh Muslim University. It was completed in 1893 and named for Aligarh's British civil servant of the Indian Civil Service (ICS) and district magistrate, J. H. Harrison.

== Origin ==
The clock tower at Aligarh, Uttar Pradesh, was completed in 1893 and named for Aligarh's British civil servant of the Indian Civil Service (ICS) and district magistrate J. H. Harrison. It was built in an English architectural design in collaboration with a Muslim style.

== Structure and location ==
The tower is situated near the Aligarh Muslim University. Opposite are the judges courts, and adjacent is a garden.

The structure has four sides, five floors and is built in stone and brick. Open arches support each vaulted roof.

== Gallery ==
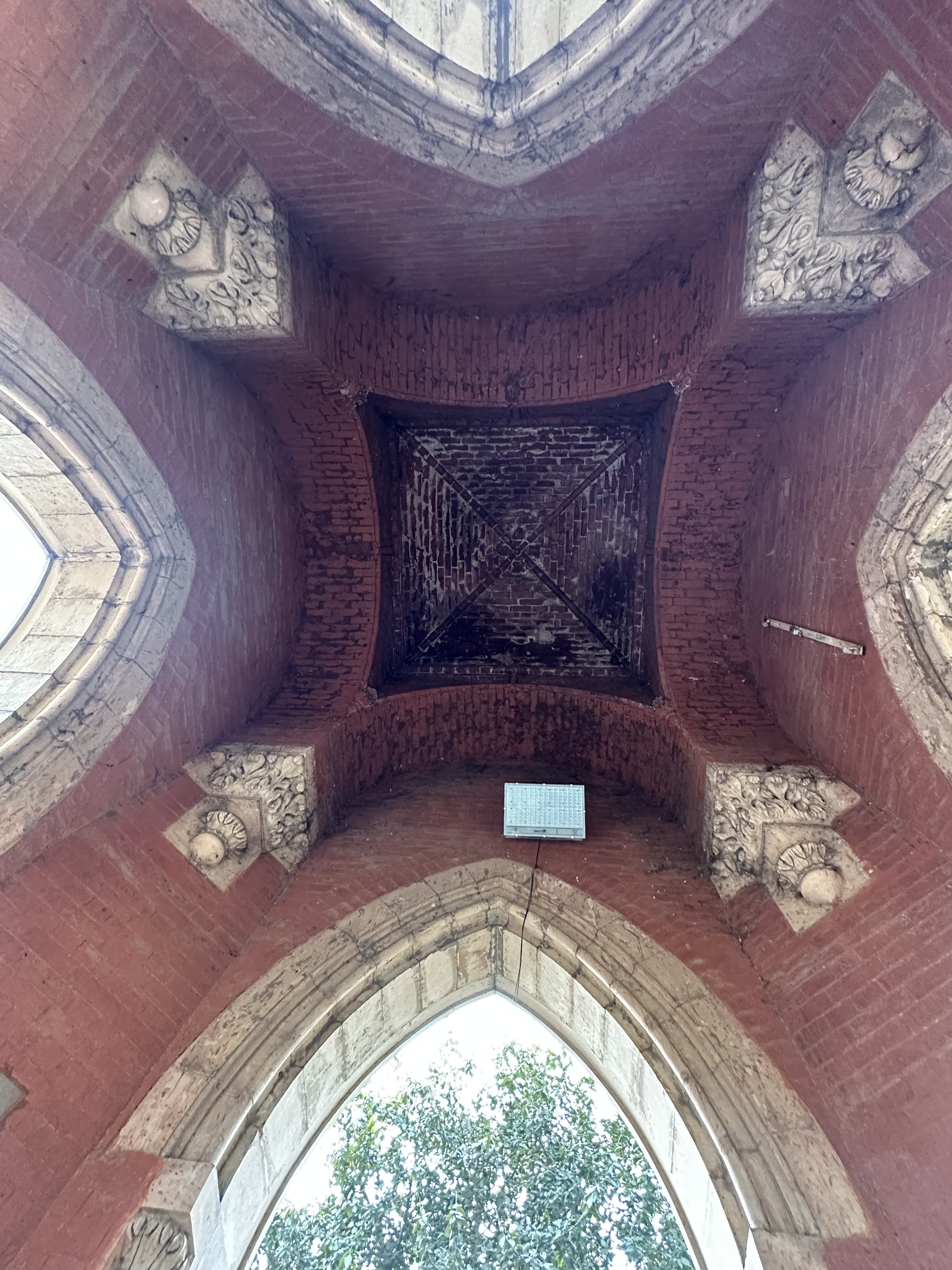
Ceiling

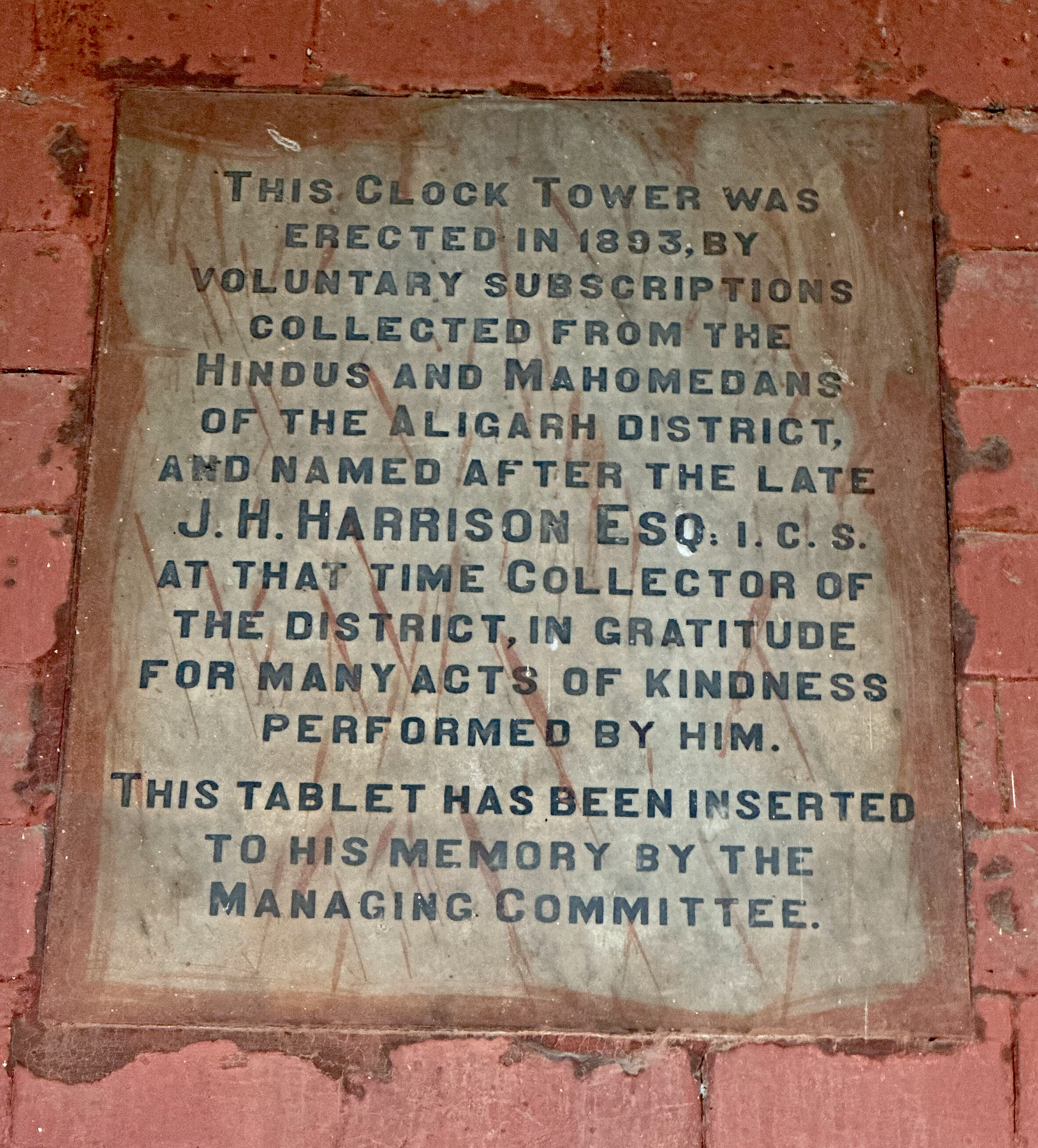
Inscription

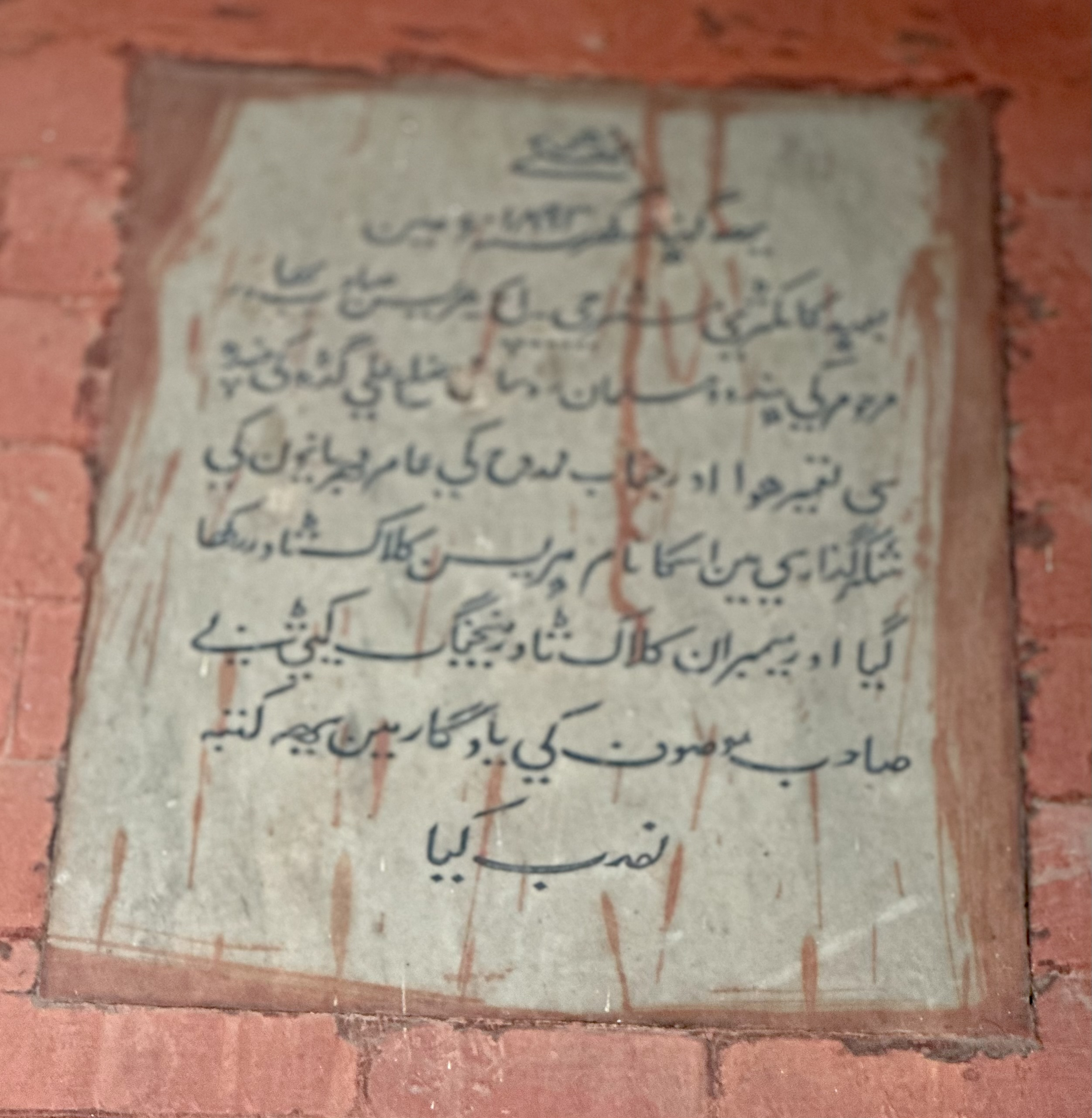
Inscription

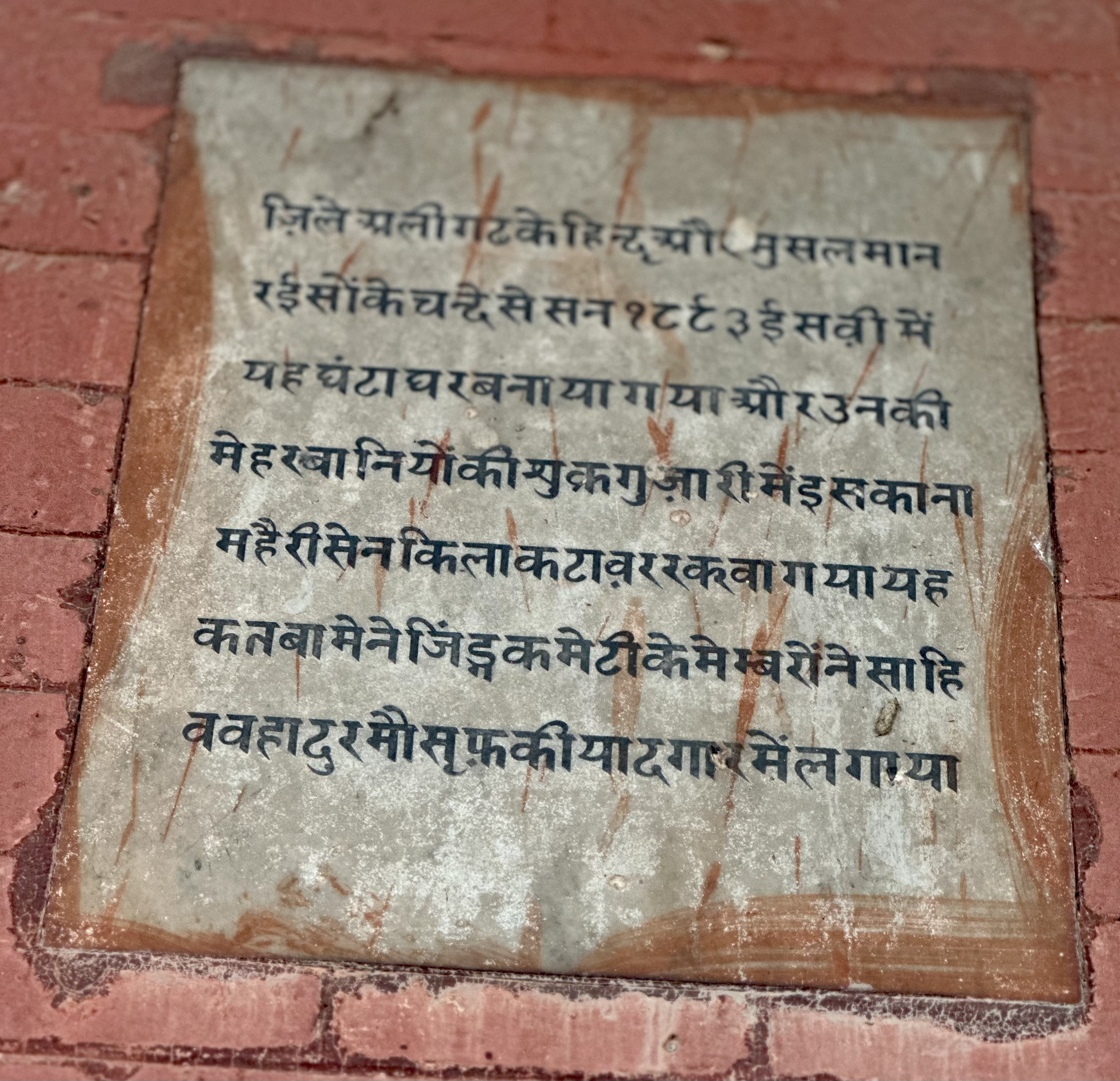
Inscription

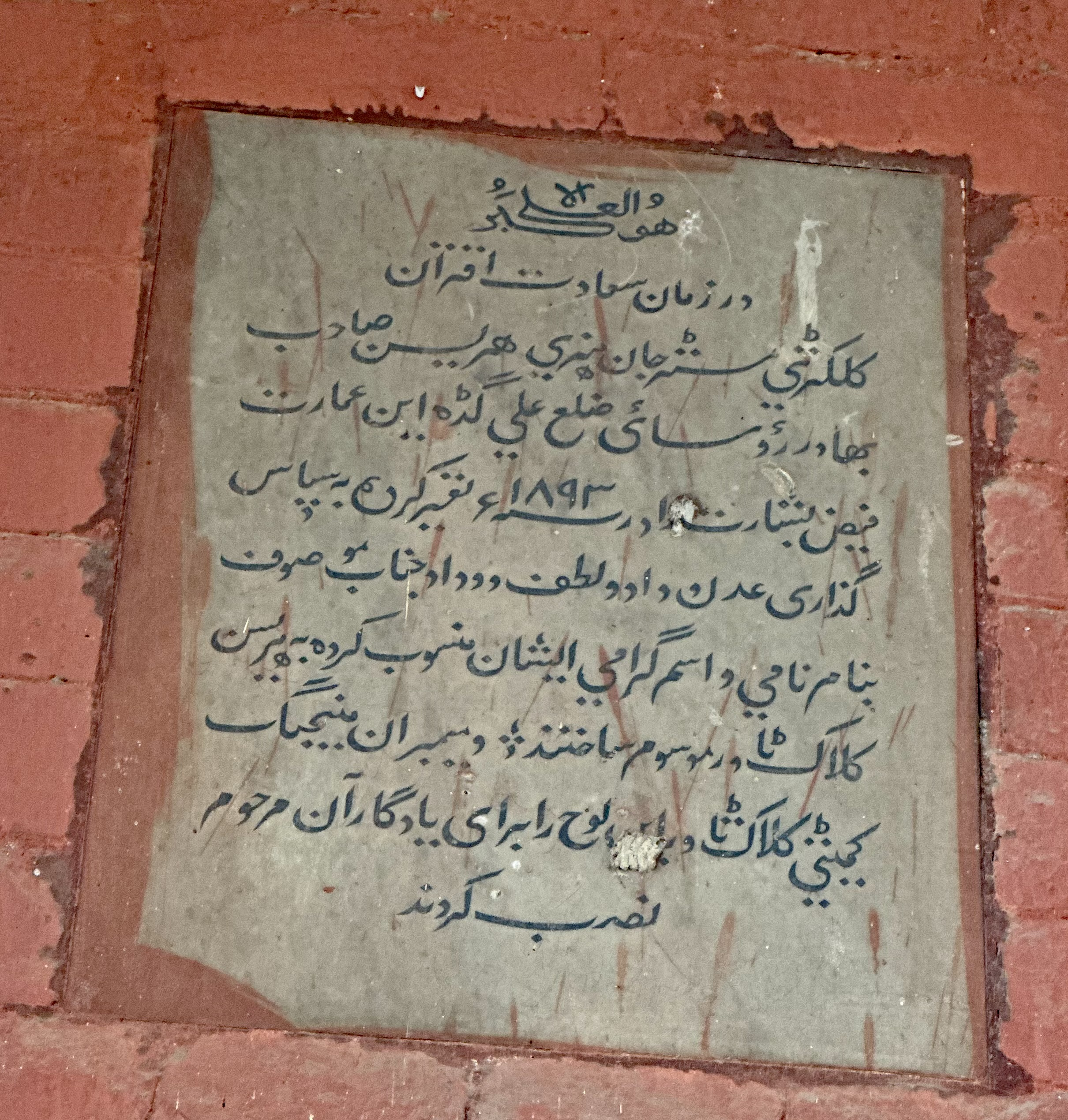
Inscription

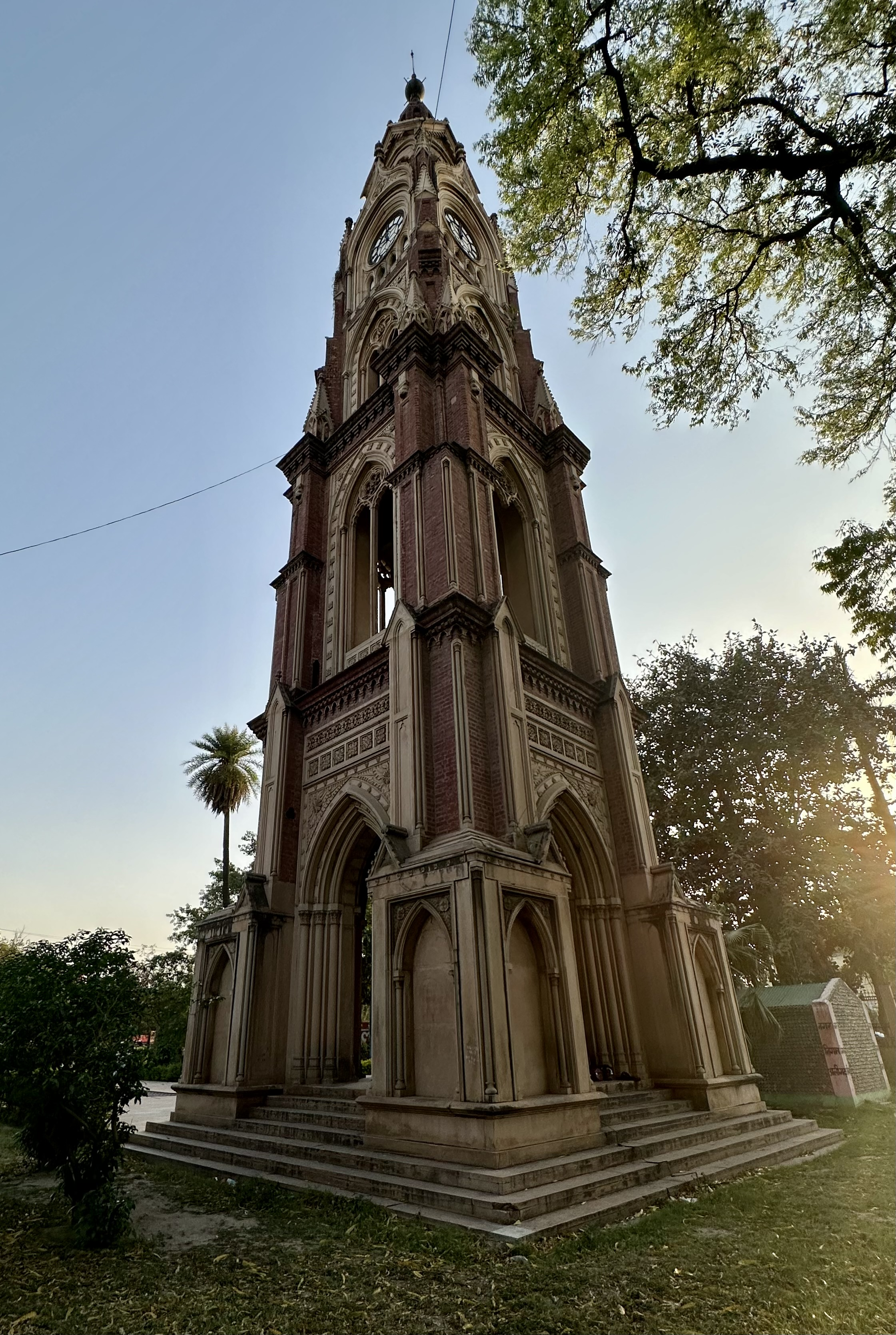
Clock Tower
