= Phool Patti ka Kaam =

Applique work of Uttar Pradesh India

Phool Patti ka Kaam (Patti work, Patti ka kaam, Floral and leaf motifs) is a dying traditional craft of appliqué style embroidery practiced at Aligarh and Rampur, Uttar Pradesh. Phool Patti ka Kaam was the combination of patchwork and embroidery in which floral designs were created on clothes. The fabric cut pieces formed into motifs and hemmed onto the ground fabric and stems were embroidered along with stem stitches. The craft was famous during the Mughal period. The appliqué was done on fine muslins, white cotton fabric or organdy. In the past, A large number of women workers were used to be engaged in this craft.

== Use ==
The art was famous for ladies' costumes mainly sari, and The efforts are continuing to revive the old craft.

== See also ==
- Patchwork
- Embroidery of India
