= Siege of Aligarh =

1803 battle in India

- Part of the Second Anglo-Maratha War
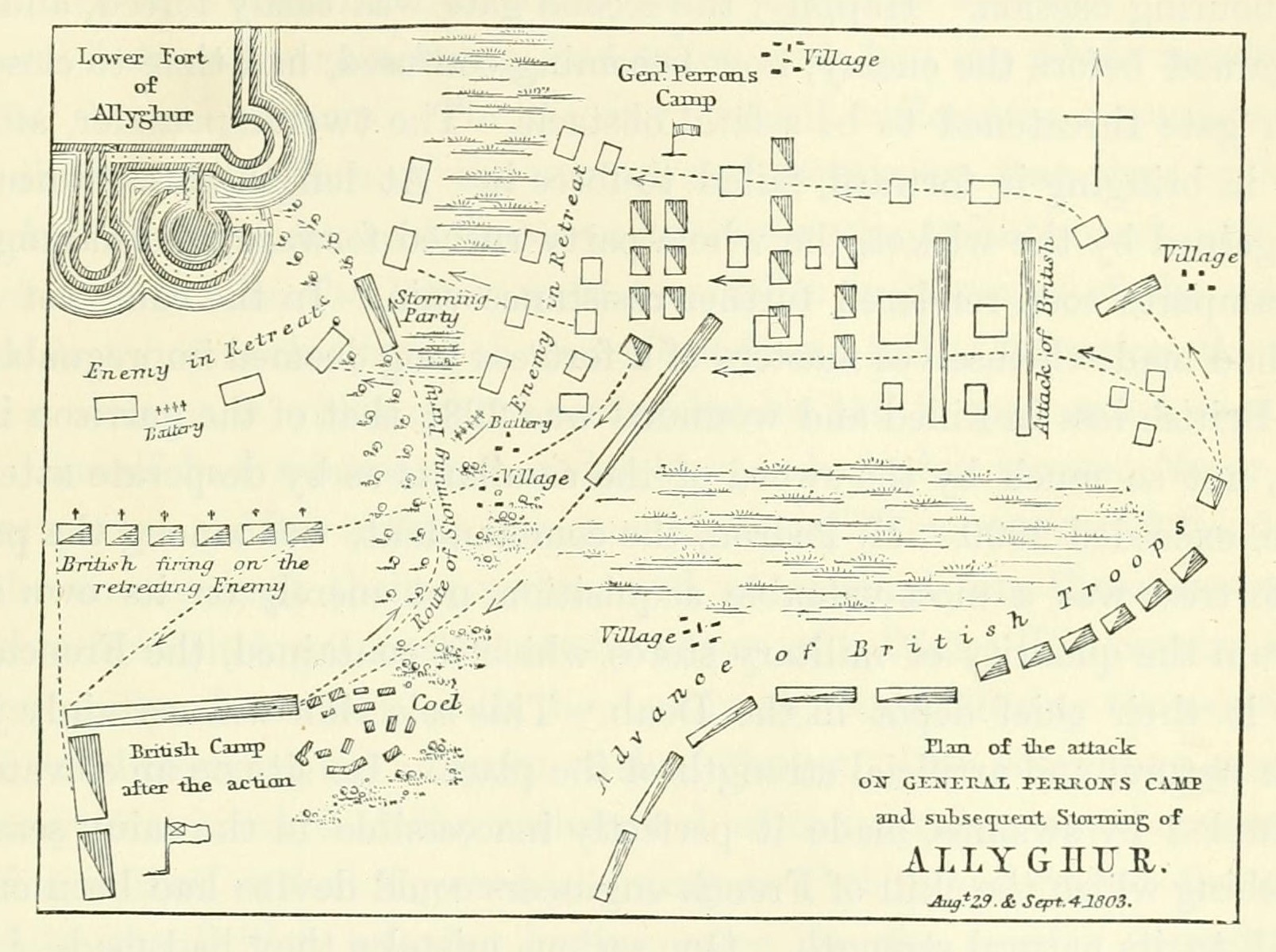
- Attack on Perron's camp and storming of Allyghur, Aug – Sep 1803
Date	1–4 September 1803 (3 days)
Location	Aligarh, Uttar Pradesh, India 27.928°N 78.067°E
Result	British victory

Belligerents
British Empire: East India Company	Maratha Empire

Commanders and leaders
(United Kingdom of Great Britain and Ireland) Gerard Lake (East India Company) James Skinner	Pierre Cuillier-Perron

Casualties and losses
900	300

The siege of Aligarh also known as the Battle of Aligarh was fought between the Maratha Confederacy and the British East India Company during the Second Anglo-Maratha War (1803–1805) at Aligarh, India.

Aligarh Fort, one of the strongest forts in India, was fortified and commanded by a French mercenary officer Pierre Perron. It was laid under siege on 1 September 1803, by the British 76th Regiment, now known as the Yorkshire Regiment, under General Lord Gerard Lake. It was captured from the Marathas on 4 September 1803. During the assault, fourteen ditches were lined with sword-blades and poisoned chevaux-de-frise around the fort by the Maratha soldiers. The then Duke of Wellington declared the capture as "One of the most extraordinary feats of the British conquest of Northern India".

== See also ==
- 1803 Garhwal earthquake
