= Roshan Ara Bokhari =

Pakistani dance and choreographer

Roshan Ara Bokhari is a Pakistani dancer and dance choreographer. She was born in Aligarh in 1934. Bokhari's mother is Mian Abdul Aziz and she inherited a love for dance and music from her family.

== Early life ==
Bokhari started her early education at Queens Mary College in Lahore. She currently lives in Karachi. She studied classical and field dancing from the classical dancers Tara Chaudhry and Rafi Anwar from the age of 11.

== Career ==
Bokhari worked for 47 years in the field of dancing and choreography, from 1965 until 2012. She was a member of the Pakistan Cultural Delegation that went to China in 1965. She also taught at the National Performing Arts Group (NPAG) along with former actress Zarin Panna and dance master Zafar Dilawar. Her students perform every year on 14 August and on International Dance Day. It has represented Pakistan in other countries and even won prizes in the United States, China, India, and Kazakhstan. They even performed to represent the sufferings of flood victims. Her contributions towards dance have been recognized by institutions such as Art Now Pakistan, the National Performance Arts Group, and Lahore Grammar School.

== Performances ==
Bokhari has choreographed several thematic dances and field shows for the South Asian Federation games in 1988 and 2005. She also led a team of dancers that visited China in 1965.
