= Shekha Bird Sanctuary =

Lake and sanctuary in Uttar Pradesh, India

- IUCN category IV (habitat/species management area)
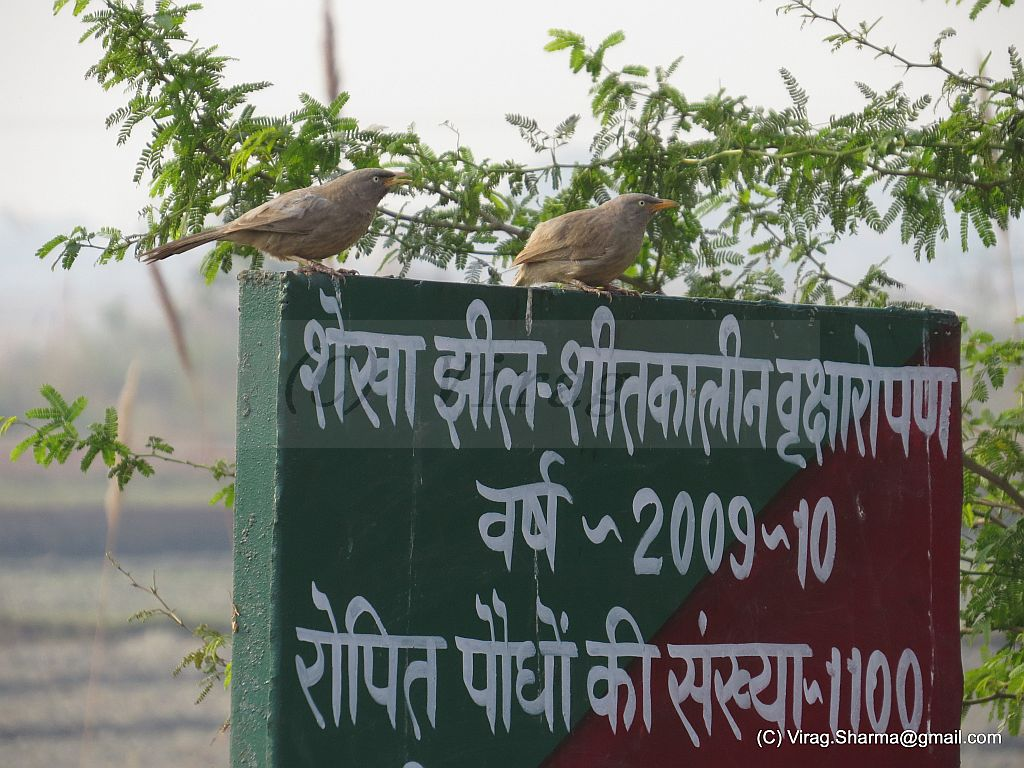

- Location within Uttar Pradesh Location within India
- Interactive map of Shekha Bird Sanctuary
- Location: Aligarh district, Uttar Pradesh, India
- Nearest city: Aligarh
- Coordinates: 27°51′21″N 78°13′06″E
- Created: 2009
- Governing body: Uttar Pradesh Government

Shekha Bird Sanctuary is a bird sanctuary at a 25 ha (62 acres) lake near the village of Shekha, 17 km (11 mi) east of Aligarh and 5 km (3.1 mi) from the Grand Trunk Road (GT Road) in the state of Uttar Pradesh, India. It is notable for birding as many birds overwinter there.

It is a fresh water perennial water body that came into existence after the formation of the Upper Ganges Canal in 1852 which flows adjacent to the lake. It is maintained by the Forest Department.

The best time to visit is between November and February. Starting January 2015, there is a cost of ₹10 for visitors.

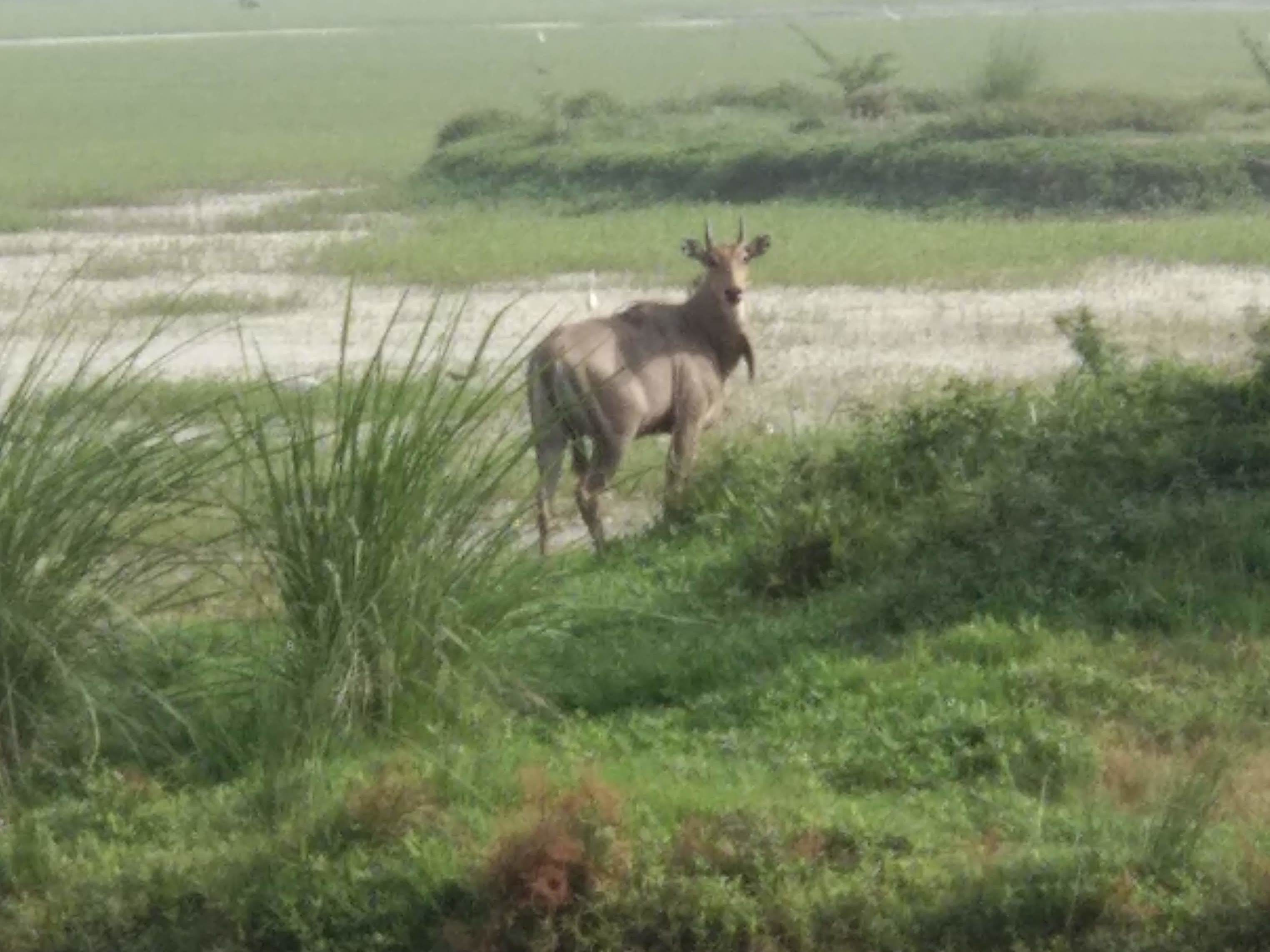
A Nilgai observed near shekha jheel area

== List of birds ==
- Black-necked stork
- White ibis
- Spoonbill
- Greylag goose
- Bar-headed goose
- Lesser whistling teal
- Ruddy shelduck
- Northern pintail
- Common teal
- Indian spot-billed duck
- Sarus crane
- Asian openbill stork
- Red-breasted flycatcher
- Black- necked stork
- Wooly-necked stork
- Common Pochard
- Ferruginous Duck
- Ferruginous Duck
- Baer's Pochard
- Tufted Duck
- Indian Peafowl
- Common Quail
- Black Francolin
- Gray Francolin
- Little Grebe
- Asian Openbill
- Woolly-necked Stork
- Black-necked Stork
- Little Cormorant
- Great Cormorant
- Purple Heron
- Cattle Egret
- Indian Pond-Heron
- Black-headed Ibis
- Red-naped Ibis
- Eurasian Spoonbill
- Black-shouldered Kite
- Booted Eagle
- Bonelli's Eagle
- Shikra
- Black Kite
- Egyptian vulture

== Gallery ==
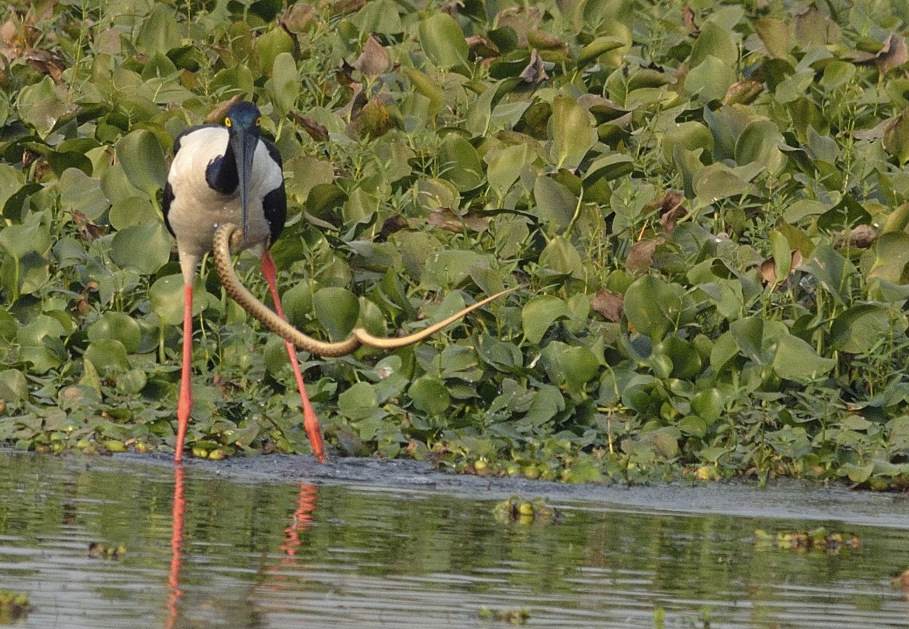
Black-necked stork killing a snake

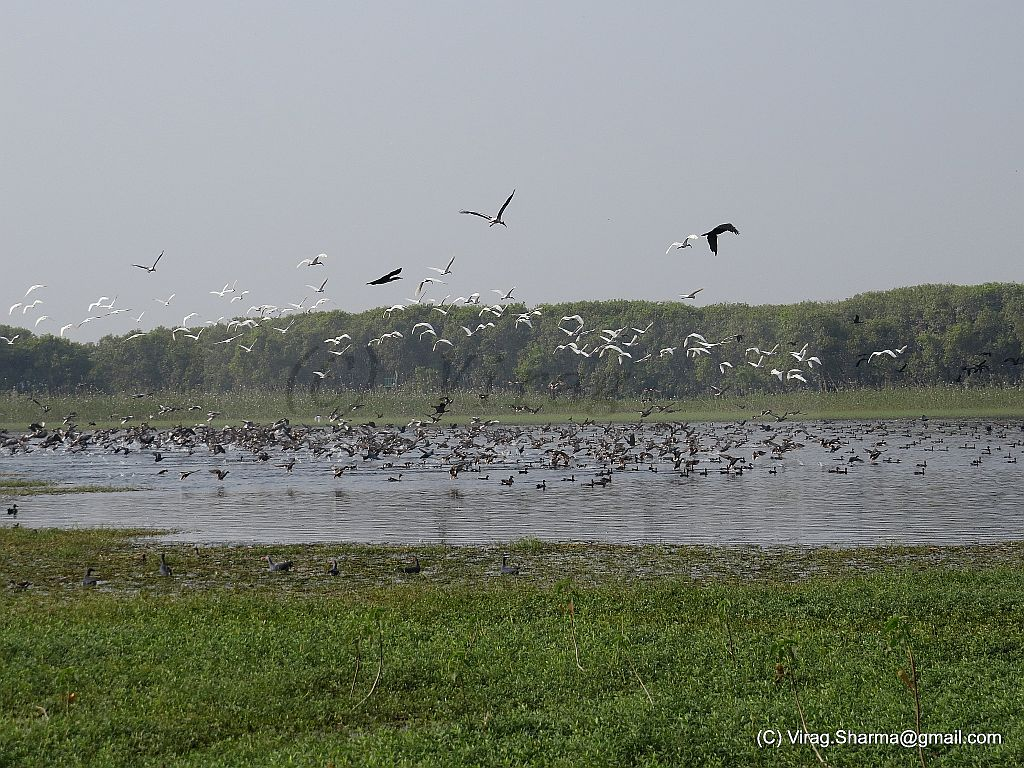

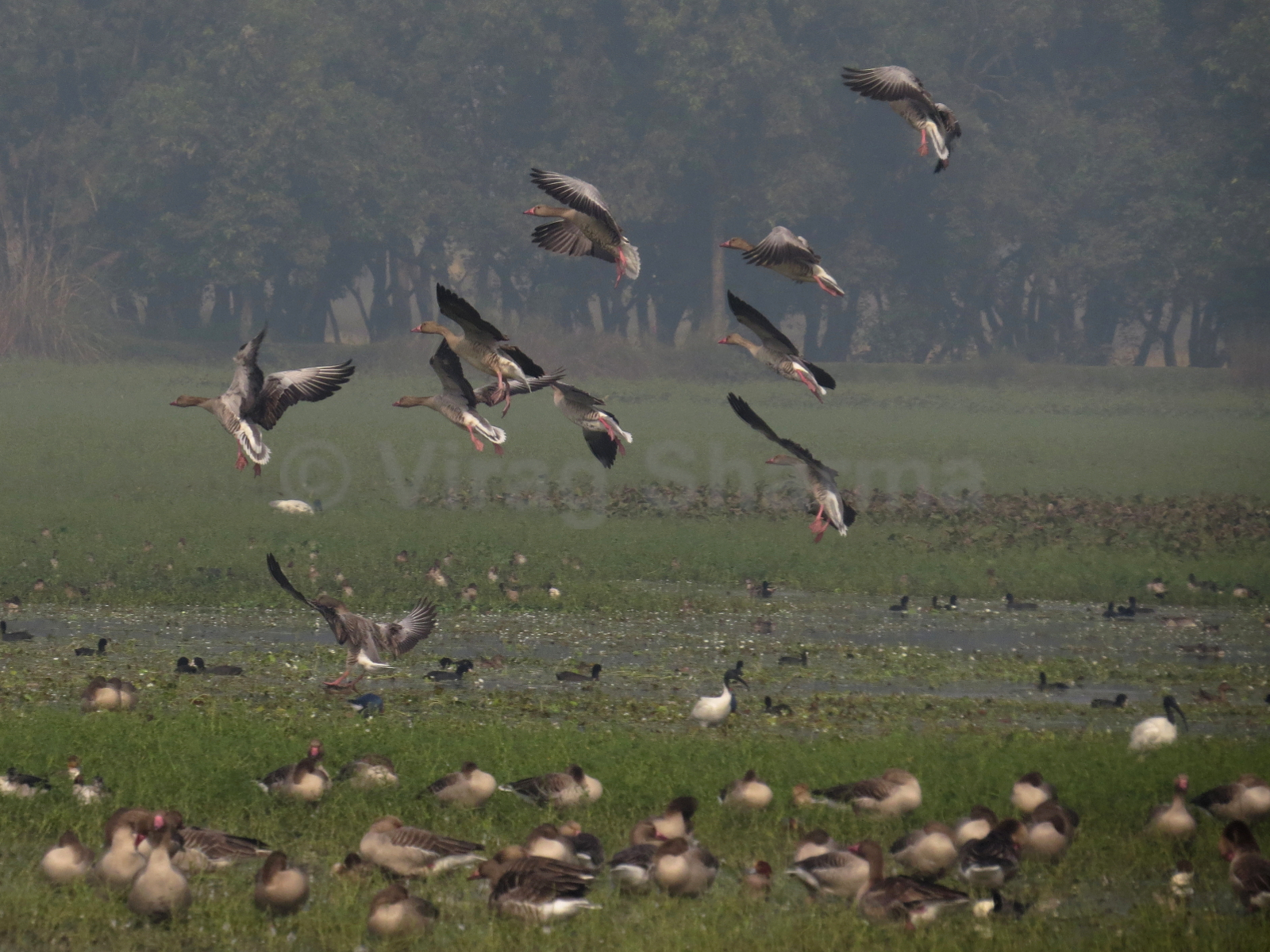
Graylag goose

== See also ==
- Keetham Lake
