= Prem Kishore Patakha =

Indian comic poet

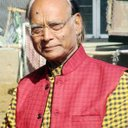
- Born: 27 October 1943 (age 82); Aligarh, United Provinces, British India
- Citizenship: Indian
- Occupation: Poet
- Writing career
- Genre: Comical Poetry

Prem Kishore Patakha (born 27 October 1943) is a Hindi author of comedic poetry (hasya kavi). He was born into a Barhai family at Aligarh, Uttar Pradesh. He appeared as a guest on the television programme of Bollywood actor Bharat Bhushan.

== Published works ==
=== Writer ===
- '101 Amar Kathayen'Kitabghar Prakashan

=== Comical literature ===
- 'Ranga Rang Hasya Kavi Sammelan'
- 'Shreshtha Hasya Vyangya Geet' with Ashok Anjum for Prabhat Prakashan
- 'Vyangya Kathaon Ka Sansar'
- 'Hasya Avam Vyangyang Gazalein' with Ashok Anjum for Pustak Mahal

=== Children's literature ===
- 'Shabash Daddy ',

=== Editing ===
- 'Hasya-Vinod Kavya Kosh' for Kitabghar Prakashan

== Lokpal bill ==
Patakha is a member of Anna Hazare's India Against Corruption.

== Awards ==
- Hasy Ratn Shikhar Shri Shamman year 1986.
- Shikhar Shri Samman year 1988.
- Baal Sakha Shri year 1990.
- Chitra Kala Sangam Nayi Delhi year 2009.

== Personal life ==
He has one son and one grandson. Patakha's niece died in a road accident in Kurawali, Mainpuri.
