= Maulana Azad Library =

Central library of Aligarh Muslim University in Aligarh, Uttar Pradesh, India

Coordinates: 27.8800°N 78.0800°E

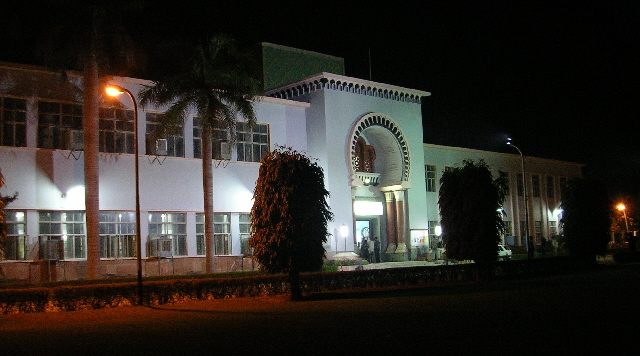
- Location: Aligarh Muslim University, Aligarh, Aligarh, Uttar Pradesh, India
- Type: University Library
- Established: 1960 (formally in 1877 as Lytton Library)
- Branches: 110

Collection
- Size: 1.8 million volumes

Access and use
- Circulation: 60565
- Population served: 28,000 students; 1,342 Faculty, 5,610 non-teaching staff

Other information
- Budget: 23.37 Million Rupees
- Director: Nishat Fatima
- Website: Official website

The Maulana Azad Library is the central library of Aligarh Muslim University in Aligarh, India. It is the largest university library in Asia. The seven-storey building is surrounded by 4.75 acres (1.92 ha) of lawns and gardens. It has about 1,500,000 print collection out of which 1,381,782 are books. It celebrated its 73rd anniversary on 7 December 2023.

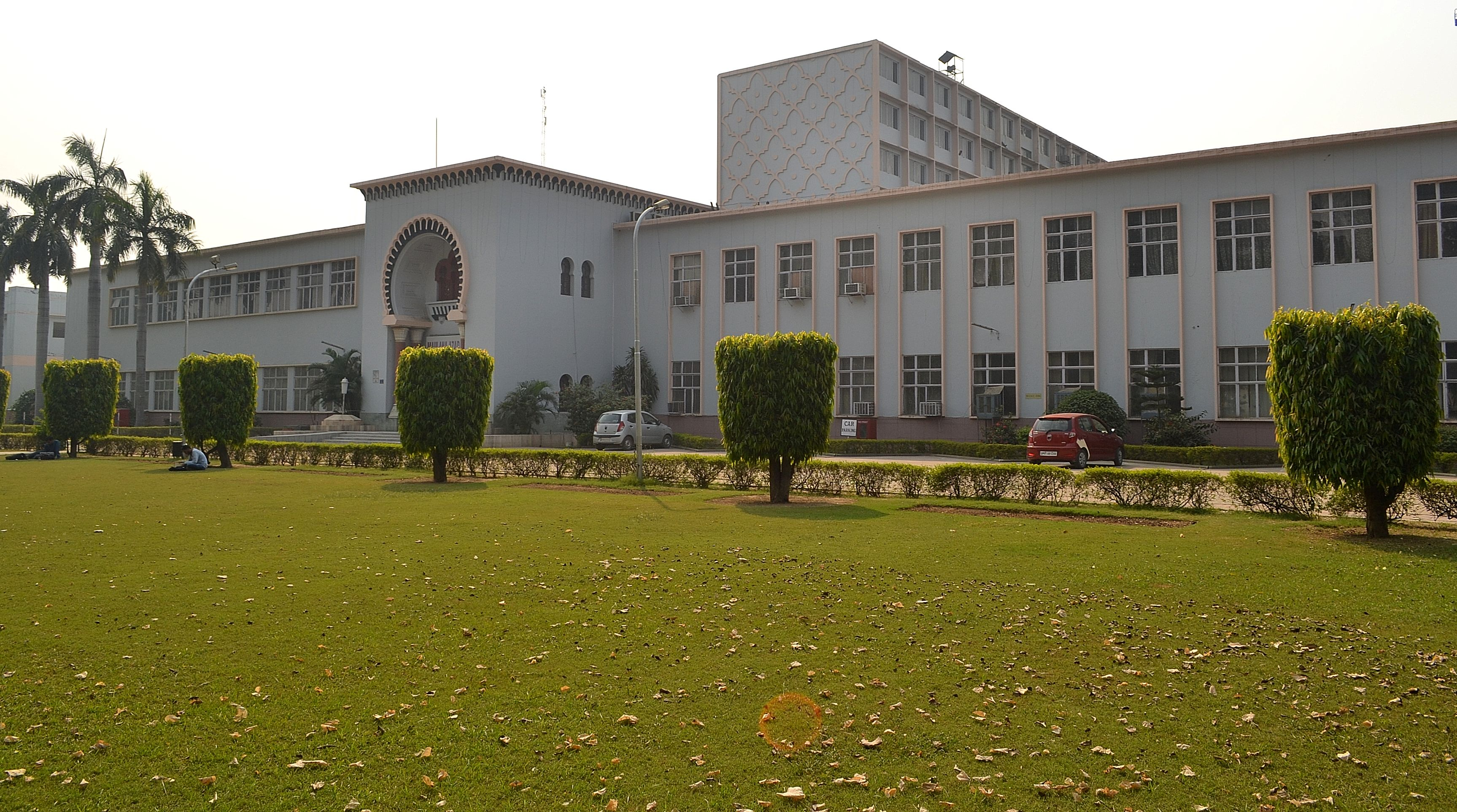
Maulana Azad Library, AMU

The library received a donation of around 5000 books which were the personal collection of the poet Kaifi Azmi.

Prof Nishat Fatima serves as the current university librarian of the library.

== History ==
The foundation of the library was laid in 1877 at the time of establishment of the Mohammedan Anglo Oriental College by Lord Robert Bulwer-Lytton, 1st Earl of Lytton, the then Viceroy of India and it was named after him as Lytton Library. The present seven-story building was inaugurated by Jawaharlal Nehru, the first Prime Minister of India in 1960 and the library was named as Maulana Azad Library, dedicated after a great scholar, educationist, statesman, freedom fighter and the first Education Minister of India, Maulana Azad.

== Holdings ==
Maulana Azad Library (Side view)

The library's collection includes about 1,800,000 documents including books, periodicals, pamphlets, manuscripts, paintings and photographs. It aims at supporting students from all departments of the University.

The library has a sizeable collection of early printed books in many languages including Latin translation of the Arabic work Book of Optics by Ibn al-Haytham (965–1039) published in 1572. The Library holds an invaluable collection of 15,162 rare manuscripts, one of which written on parchment in Koofi script is claimed to be inscribed by Ali (the fourth Caliph of Islam) 1400 years ago. Other items in the collection include several farmans (decrees) issued by Mughal rulers (including Babur, Akbar, Shahjahan, Shah Alam, Shah Alamgir, and Aurangzeb); a "shirt" on which the whole Qur'an is inscribed in khafi script; the Ayurved written in Telugu; and works by Bhasa written in Malayalam on palm leaves.

The Oriental Division of Maulana Azad Library consists of about 200,000 printed books and periodicals. Donations received have been designated as special collections by the names of their donors. The Urdu collection with more than 100,000 books forms the largest part of the Oriental Division. A substantial number of rare and out-of-print publications of the 19th century belong to the Scientific Society of Sir Syed Ahmad Khan, Fort William College (Kolkata), Delhi College, Agra College and from the Royal Printing Presses of the courts of Delhi and Oudh.

Among the large collection of Mughal paintings is the painting of Red Blossom by Mansoor Naqqash, court artist of the Emperor Jahangir. Some valuable Sanskrit works translated into Persian have also been preserved in the library. Abul al-Faiz (Faizi), an eminent scholar of Akbar's court translated several Sanskrit works into Persian, such as Mahapurana, Bhagavad Gita, Mahabharat and Lilavati.

== Building and services ==
The building has seven stories. It is surrounded by 4.75 acres of lawns and gardens. Over 8,000 students, teachers and other members of the university daily visit the library and use its services. There are six large size reading halls apart from eight small reading rooms with a seating capacity of about 2000 students at a time. The reading rooms open 18 hours a day. The library provides the campus with access to online journals through a Computer Lab. Digital resources on many subjects are made accessible through a Digital Resource Centre. All the issuable books are bar-coded for automated check in and check out. The university has established book banks for the benefit of students of certain professional courses.

Forty-three thousand e-journals have been added to the e-resources of the Library which are accessible on campus-wide Network of the University.
