= Roohi Zuberi =

Indian social worker and politician (born 1959)

President of Women's Welfare Society

Personal details
- Born: 24 March 1959 (age 67) Etah, Uttar Pradesh, India
- Party: Indian National Congress
- Spouse: Ahmad Ziauddin
- Education: Aligarh Muslim University
- Profession: Advocate, Counselor, Social worker, Politician, Activist

Roohi Zuberi (born 24 March 1959) is an Indian social worker and women's rights activist. Zuberi has also served as a senior cabinet member at Mumbai University.

== Family background ==
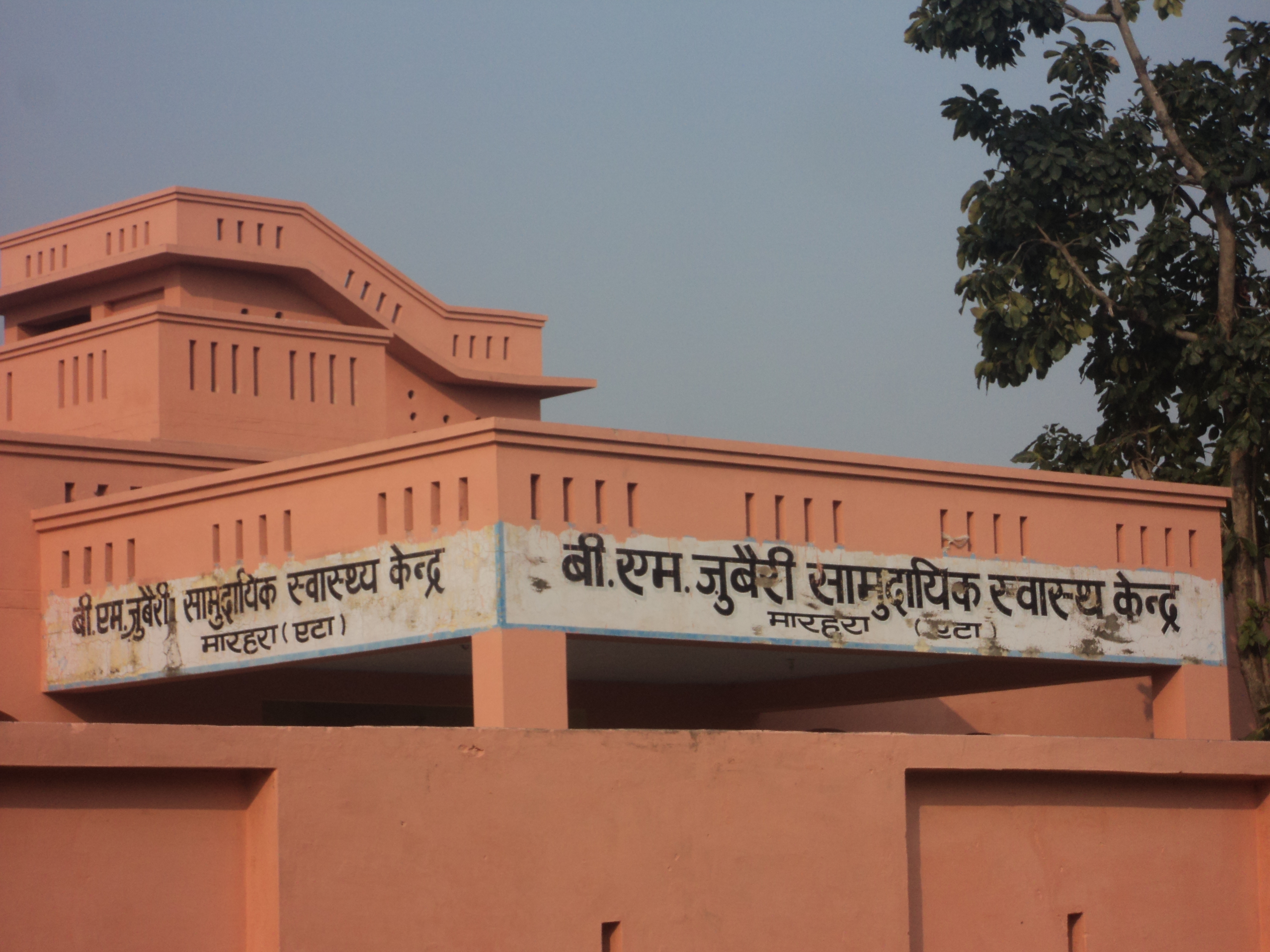
B.M Zuberi Hospital

Roohi Zuberi hails from a prominent family in Marehra, Uttar Pradesh, India. Her father, the late Mr. Bashir Mahmood Zuberi (Advocate) (1921–1993), was a notable freedom fighter during the Indian Independence Struggle against British Raj. He was also a social worker, politician, and the Chairman of the Marehra Municipal Board. Throughout his life, he dedicated much of his personal wealth to the development and welfare of the local community. In his honor, the B. M. Zuberi Hospital, a civil government hospital in Marehra, is named after him.

Zuberi is also related to Maulvi Bashir Uddin, who devoted his resources to establishing Islamia College in Etawah, Uttar Pradesh, Uttar Pradesh, in 1888. This institution aimed to provide educational opportunities similar to those of the Muhammadan Anglo-Oriental College. Uddin was a member of the Indian National Congress, known for wearing Khadi and for publishing the respected paper al-Bashir. Despite being awarded the Padma Shri, he declined to accept it, just as he did with the title of Khan Bahadur. Notably, former President of India Dr. Zakir Husain was a student at Islamia College.

Roohi Zuberi is also the daughter-in-law of Dr Sir Ziauddin Ahmad, a distinguished mathematician and former Parliamentarian. He was a key figure in the Aligarh Movement and served as Vice Chancellor of Aligarh Muslim University, for three terms, later becoming its Rector.

Additionally, her maternal uncle, Matin Zuberi, was a scholar of international relations. Born in Marehra on July 15, 1930, he earned his master's degree from Aligarh Muslim University before continuing his studies at St. Anthony's and Balliol Colleges at the University of Oxford. Upon returning to India, he became a senior fellow at the Institute of Advanced Study in Shimla and joined Jawaharlal Nehru University (JNU) in 1978, where he taught until 1995.

== Career ==
As a professor of international politics and disarmament studies at JNU, Zuberi was an observer of international nuclear developments. He served on the National Security Advisory Board during three terms (1990–91, 1998–99, and 2000–01) and contributed to the Draft Indian Nuclear Doctrine. He was also part of the Indian delegation to the United Nations Conference on Disarmament and Development and held positions in various prestigious organizations related to defense and international studies.

Zuberi was a district president for National Students' Union of India in 1972-73, the same year serving as the secretary of Abdullah Girls College. In 1974-75, she became an executive member of the Aligarh Muslim University Students' Union. In the 1980s, she served as the union's vice-president, and subsequently as an ad hoc president in 1982.

Zuberi founded the Women's Welfare Society in 1986. She served as the district president for Mahila Congress in Aligarh during 1992, and subsequently became the general secretary in 1993. She also served as the vice president of the District Congress Committee and was a member of the Uttar Pradesh Congress Committee for five times.

From 1996 to 2008, she worked as the Secretary of Uttar Pradesh Congress Committee, In 2001, she contested mayor elections in Aligarh on a congress party ticket. In her other roles, she served as a general secretary of the UPCC. She has formerly been a member of Railway Board, Telephone Advisory Board, Lok Adalat in Aligarh, District Consumer Forum, and a vice-president of Akansha Samiti, formed by the District Magistrate.

== Awards ==
- Bhartiya Nari Shakti Award for her role in women empowerment on 29 January 2014 at the Constitutional Club of India, New Delhi
- Rashtriya Gaurav Award, in the field of Social Work by the India International Friendship Society (2014)

== Personal life and family ==
Roohi Zuberi is married to Ahmad Zia-ud-din and they have three sons, Md. Zia-ud-din (Rahi), Shahbaz Zia-ud-din, Sheeraz Ahmad and a daughter, Sadaf Ahmad.
