= Swami Shree Haridas Ji =

Nepali Hindu spiritual leader

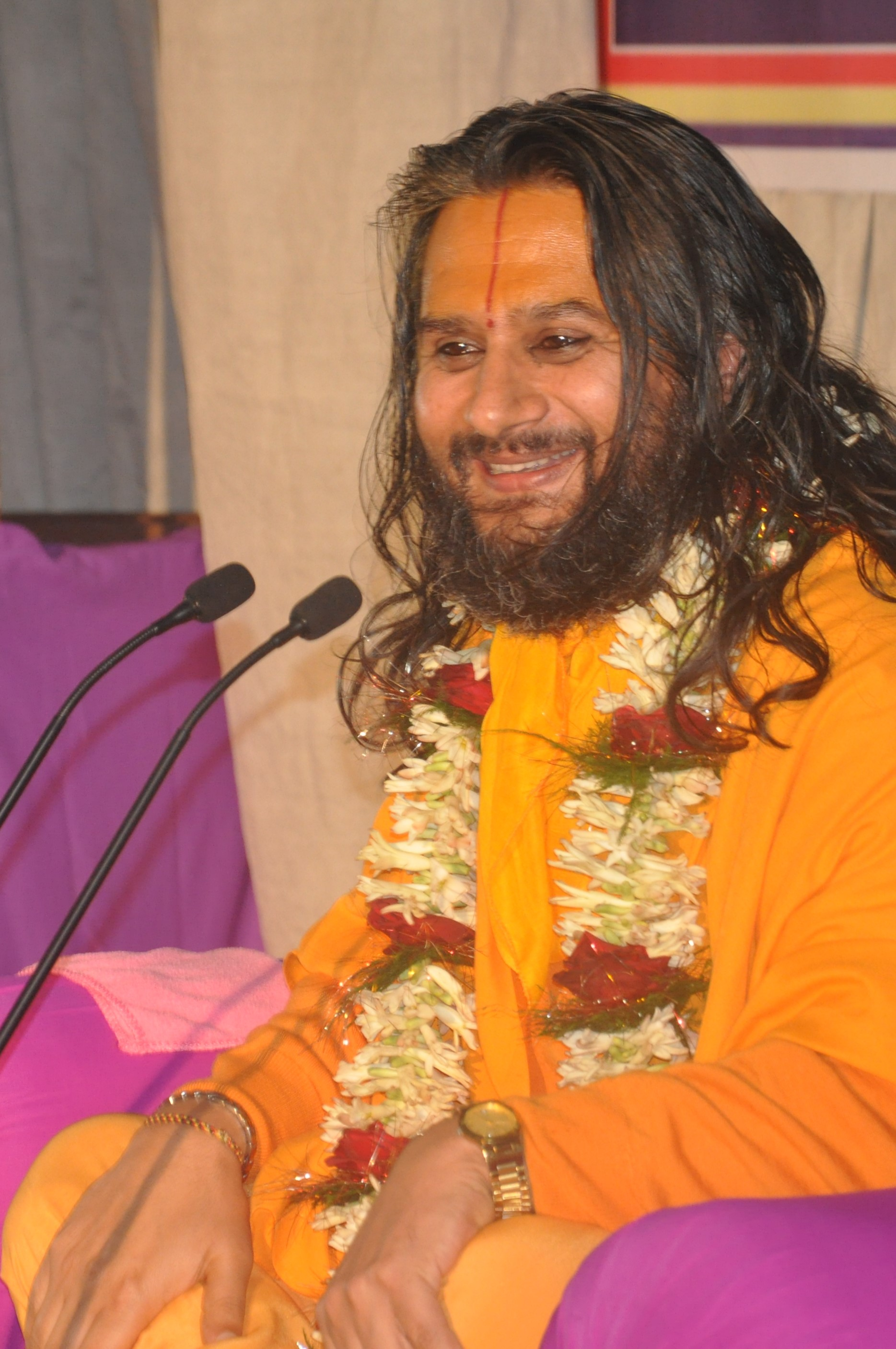

Personal life
- Born: October 1 Kathmandu, Nepal
- Honors: Guru

Religious life
- Religion: Hinduism
- Founder of: Divine Club Worldwide, Divine Youth Club Nepal, Shree Radha Madhav Samiti Nepal, Bidwat Samaj Nepal
- Philosophy: Philosophy of Divine Love
- Sect: Bhakti Yoga

Religious career
- Teacher: Kripalu Maharaj

Rasik Saint

Swami Shree Haridas Ji is a Hindu spiritual leader from Kathmandu, Nepal. He was awarded the title of "Swami" on October 1, 2008, by Kripalu Maharaj. Since then, he has been preaching the on Hindu religious works, as well as other Eastern and Western philosophies across Nepal. He has also preached in the United States, United Kingdom, Canada, and India.
