= Mohammad Furqan =

Mohammad Furqan, is a Uttar Pradesh politician of the Bahujan Samaj Party and was elected mayor of Aligarh Municipal Corporation in 2017.
