= Sheela Foam Limited =

Indian manufacturer and supplier of polyurethane foam mattresses

- Sheela Foam Limited logo
- Type: Public
- Traded as: BSE: 540203, NSE: SHEELAFOAM
- Industry: Manufacturing
- Founded: 1971
- Founder: Sheela Gautam
- Headquarters: Noida, Uttar Pradesh, India
- Products: Mattresses, Foam products, Home comfort solutions
- Brands: Sleepwell, Kurl-On, Furlenco
- Subsidiaries: Joyce Foam Pty Ltd, Interplasp S.L.U., STAQO Technologies
- Website: https://www.sheelafoam.com

Sheela Foam Limited (SFL) is an Indian multinational company that manufactures and supplies polyurethane foam mattresses and related comfort products. Sheela Foam operates across India, Australia, and Europe, with 22 manufacturing facilities in these regions.

== History ==
Sheela Foam was established by Indian politician and entrepreneur Sheela Gautam in 1971 in Sahibabad, Uttar Pradesh, focusing initially on polyurethane foam production. In 1994, the company launched its flagship brand, Sleepwell, which became a major mattress brand in India. In 1995, Sheela Foam introduced specialized foam products for the automotive and healthcare industries.

Between 1998 and 1999, the company introduced rubberized coir products Starlite and collaborated with Serta (USA), and Dunlopillo (UK), for mattress production. From 2001 to 2003, Sheela Foam established a polyurethane foam-producing plant in Greater Noida and expanded operations to Rajpura, Punjab, and Sikkim. In 2005, Sheela Foam made its first global acquisition by purchasing Joyce Foam, an Australian polyurethane foam manufacturer. Between 2008 and 2010, Sheela Foam received multiple CIO 100 Awards for IT excellence.

In 2016, the company was listed on the Bombay Stock Exchange (BSE) and National Stock Exchange (NSE). In 2017, the company received the PU Tech Innovation Award for its vertical variable pressure foaming technology. In 2018, Sheela Foam`s corporate office in Noida received Platinum LEED Certification for sustainability. The same year, Sheela Foam was named Business Standard Star SME of the Year.

In 2019, Sheela Foam entered the European market by acquiring Interplasp S.L.U., a Spanish polyether foam manufacturer. In 2021, the company received the India Manufacturing Excellence Award for its PU foam manufacturing. In 2023, Sheela Foam acquired Kurl-On, an Indian rubberized coir mattress manufacturer, and invested in Furlenco, an online furniture rental company.

Sheela Foam is a member of the Indian Sleep Products Federation (ISPF) and the Indian Polyurethane Association (IPUA).

== Operations ==
The company’s brands and subsidiaries include Sleepwell, the Indian mattress and home comfort brand; Kurl-On, which specializes in rubberized coir mattresses; and Furlenco, an online furniture and home decor provider. Globally, Sheela Foam owns Joyce Foam Pty Ltd in Australia, a polyurethane foam manufacturer, and Interplasp S.L.U., a Spanish polyether foam producer.

Sheela Foam invests in digital transformation through its subsidiary, STAQO Technologies. This subsidiary develops enterprise technologies, automation, and digital workflow optimization for manufacturing and retail operations. The company carries out corporate social responsibility (CSR) initiatives under the Sleepwell Foundation. In June 2020, Sleepwell partnered with the Indian government to donate 10,000 bedding units—including mattresses, pillows, and beds—for COVID-19 relief efforts.

== Research and development ==
Sheela Foam developed Variable Pressure Foaming (VPF) technology, a manufacturing process that eliminates harmful emissions. The company also collaborated with RMIT University, Australia, to create Pro Nexa Technology, which improves pressure relief and body support compared to conventional memory foam.

The company introduced the Sleepwell Tarang Mattress, designed as an affordable alternative to traditional cotton mattresses, and the Sleepwell Pro FitRest Mattress, which is recommended by the Indian Association of Physiotherapists for muscle recovery. The Sleepwell Pro Spinetech Mattress, developed in collaboration with the Indian Academy of Orthopaedic Surgeons, is designed to supports spinal health.
