= Pierre Cuillier-Perron =

French military adventurer

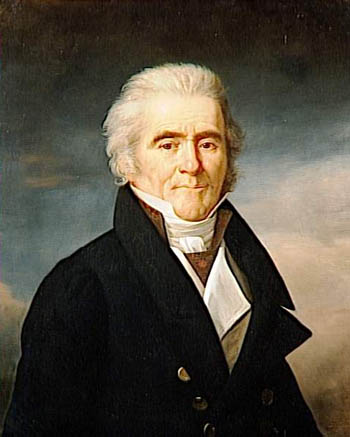
- Died: 1834
- Military career
- Allegiance: Maratha Empire
- Conflicts: Maratha–Sikh clashes Battle of Kharda; Battle of Malpura; Battle of Ujjain; Battle of Delhi, 1803 battle of Laswari; Battle of Ally Ghur; Battle of Assaye

Pierre Cuillier-Perron (1753 to 1755–1834) was a French mercenary active in India.

Born Pierre Cuillier (or Cuellier) at Luceau near Château-du-Loir was the son of a cloth merchant. In India, he changed his name to Perron (a diminutive of Pierre). He was generally referred to by his contemporaries and posterity as General Perron.

In 1780 he went out to India as a sailor on a French frigate, deserted on the Malabar coast, and made his way to upper India, where he enlisted in the Rana of Gohad's corps under a Scotsman named Sangster. In 1790 he took service under De Boigne, and was appointed to the command of his second brigade.

In 1795 he aided the Maratha forces in winning the Battle of Kharda against the nizam of Hyderabad, and on De Boigne's retirement became commander-in-chief of Maratha general Mahadji Sindhia's army. At the Battle of Malpura (1800) he defeated the Rajput forces.

After the Battle of Ujjain (1801) he refused to send his troops to the aid of Scindia. His treachery on this occasion shook his position, and on the outbreak of war between Scindia and the British in 1803 Perron was superseded and fled to the British camp.

In the battles of Delhi, Laswari, Aligarh and Assaye, Perron's battalions were completely destroyed by Lord Lake and Sir Arthur Wellesley. He returned to France with a large fortune, and died in 1834.

== Buildings ==
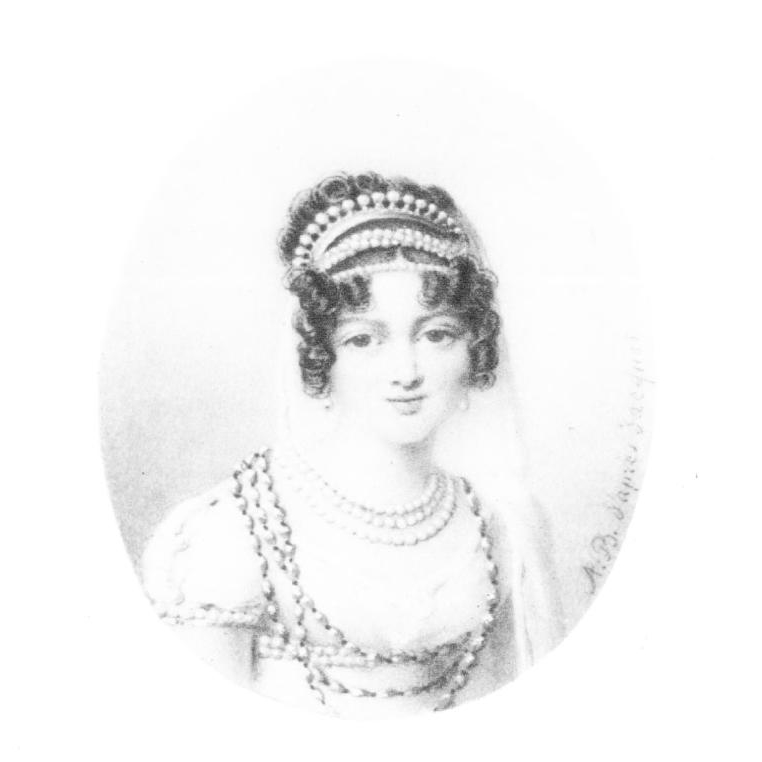
Madeleine Perron in 1817. 1st wife of General Pierre Cuillier-Perron. Married at Delhi on 16 December 1782. Sister of Major Louis Derridon.

Sir Shah Sulaiman Hall's main Building, which currently serves as the Provost Office (Administrative Block), was built by him in year 1802.

The palatial home he built for himself at Chinsurah was to house Hooghly College (Hooghly Mohsin College) from 1837 to 1937.
