= Buddha Priya Maurya =

Indian politician and Two Times Central Minister of India

B. P. Maurya
- बुद्ध प्रिय मौर्य
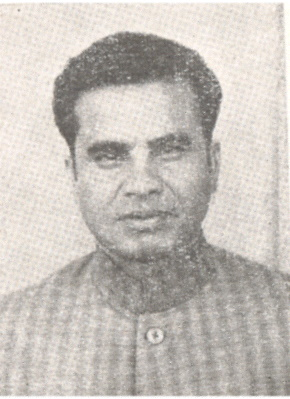

Member of Parliament, Lok Sabha
- In office 1962–1967
- Preceded by: Jamal Khwaja
- Succeeded by: Shiv Kumar Shastri
- Constituency: Aligarh
- In office 1971–1977
- Preceded by: Prakash Vir Shastri
- Succeeded by: Kunwar Mahmood Ali Khan
- Constituency: Hapur

Union Minister of State for Agriculture
- In office 11 January 1974 – 10 October 1974
- Prime Minister: Indira Gandhi

Union Minister of State for Civil Supplies and Industry
- In office 10 October 1974 – 9 August 1976
- Prime Minister: Indira Gandhi

Union Minister of State for Industry
- In office 9 August 1976 – 24 March 1977
- Prime Minister: Indira Gandhi

Member of Parliament, Rajya Sabha
- In office 1978–1984
- Constituency: Andhra Pradesh

Personal details
- Born: Buddha Priya Maurya
- Party: Indian National Congress
- Other political affiliations: Scheduled Castes Federation; Republican Party of India
- Spouse: Kanta Maurya
- Children: 5
- Parent: Girwar Maurya (father)
- Education: Balwant Rajput College, Agra

Buddha Priya Maurya (1 May 1926 – 27 September 2004), better known as B.P. Maurya, was a popular Indian politician and a member of the 3rd Lok Sabha and 5th Lok Sabha of western Uttar Pradesh. He was elected to the Lok Sabha, lower house of the Parliament of India from Hapur, Uttar Pradesh in the 1971 Indian general election as a member of the Indian National Congress, defeating senior leader Prakash Vir Shastri of Bharatiya Kranti Dal.

== Early life ==
Maurya was born on 1 May 1926 in the town of Khair in Uttar Pradesh. His family was of Rajasthani background from the town of Bharatpur. Maurya was born into Chamar (Dalit) caste, who were treated as subjected to socio-economic discrimination. Although, He attended school very late at age of 8 years. He used to graze animals in his childhood. His father took him to get admission in primary school at the age of 8, but the headmaster of the school refused to admit the child because of the child’s age. His father gave a silver coin to the headmaster as a bribe. Maurya got admission but was not allowed to sit inside the class with other general caste students with same mat. He had to carry a sitting mat with him. When he needed to drink water, someone from a higher caste had to pour that water from a height as they were not allowed to touch pitcher.

His childhood days were spent in extreme poverty. When an animal died in the village, the children used to collect and store the fat of the animal. There was no mustard or kerosene oil to light the lamps in the houses. The lamps were used to burn in the house with the fat of the dead animals. He studies in the light of whose lamps. Maurya was a very brilliant mind and within a few years, he was in the ranks of meritorious students. He started getting merit scholarships from class 4 onwards. Maurya continued his studies with daliy wages and passed High School in 1946 from Vaishya High School (Khair).
