= Saberah Malik =

Textile artist and sculptor living in Warwick, Rhode Island

- Education: Pratt Institute
- Known for: shibori, textile art, sculpture
- Website: www.saberahmalik.com

Saberah Malik is a textile artist and sculptor living in Warwick, Rhode Island.

== Early life and education ==
Malik grew up in Pakistan. Malik came to the United States in 1975. She is the granddaughter of Abdul Majeed Khwaja and the niece of Jamal Khwaja.

== Work ==
Malik's work has been featured in galleries and exhibitions in Rhode Island and internationally, including installations at the TF Green Airport Gallery in Warwick, Rhode Island, Hera Gallery in Wakefield, Rhode Island, the Three Rivers Art Festival in Pittsburgh, Pennsylvania, and the Islamic Art Revival Series in Irving, Texas. She has also been on the teaching faculty of the textile department at the Penland School of Crafts.

== Technique ==
Much of Malik's work stems from her training in shibori dyeing techniques. In addition to dyeing textiles, Malik molds textiles onto natural and man-made forms to create sculptures. She also creates what she calls "written paintings," two dimensional painted sculptures inspired by Islamic calligraphy. Her calligraphy appears in Daniyal Mueenuddin's short story collection In Other Rooms, Other Wonders.

== Bibliography ==
=== Works featuring art by Malik ===
- Dimensional Cloth:Sculpture by Contemporary Textile Artists by Andra Stanton (2018) ISBN 978-0764355363
- Pattern Base by Kristi O'Meara (2015) ISBN 978-0500291795
