= List of alumni of Christ's College, Cambridge =

Christ's College is one of the constituent colleges of the University of Cambridge in England. Its alumni include politicians, lawyers, bishops, poets, and academics.

Among politicians, the college's alumni include heads of government (Jan Smuts of South Africa and John Kotelawala of Sri Lanka), as well as several parliamentarians from various countries. Notable scientists, including Charles Darwin and J. Robert Oppenheimer, as well as Nobel laureate Duncan Haldane have studied at the college. Sportspersons associated with the college include several Olympic medalists.

== Alumni ==
The sub-headings are given as a general guide and some names might fit under more than one category.

Abbreviations used in the following tables

- DNG – Did not graduate: left the college without taking a degree

Degree abbreviations

- Undergraduate degree: BA – Bachelor of Arts
- Postgraduate degrees:
  - MA – Master of Arts
  - MPhil – Master of Philosophy

=== Arts ===
Name	Degree	Notability	Ref
Anthony Caro			
Tom de Freston			
Phillip King			

=== Business ===
Name	Degree	Notability	Ref
Ian Cheshire			
Jonathan Galassi			
David Ross Granger			
Yusuf Hamied			
Mike Lynch			
Martin Sorrell			

=== Humanities and social sciences ===
Name	Degree	Notability	Ref
J. W. Burrow		Historian	
Percy Gardner	BA 1869		
Harinath De		Indologist, polyglot	
John Leland		Antiquary	
Madhavan K. Palat		Historian	
John H. Plumb		Historian	
Roy Porter		Historian	
John Holland Rose		Historian	
John Robert Seeley		Historian	
Walter William Skeat		Philologist	
William Robertson Smith		Orientalist, Old Testament scholar, professor of divinity	
Taw Sein Ko		Burmese archaeologist	

=== Religion ===
Name	Degree	Notability	Ref
Frederick Cornwallis		Archbishop of Canterbury	
Richard Cheyney		Bishop of Gloucester	
Jill Duff		Bishop of Lancaster	
Edmund Grindal		Archbishop of Canterbury	
Matthew Hutton		Archbishop of Canterbury	
Thomas Jones		Archbishop of Dublin	
Edmund Law		Bishop of Carlisle	
William Paley			
Hugh Thomas (priest)			
Armitage Robinson			
William Pope (priest)			

=== Politicians, civil servants, royalty and nobility ===
Name	Degree	Notability	Ref
Anandamohan Bose		Indian nationalist, President of the Indian National Congress	
Sam Carling		MP for North West Cambridgeshire	
James Chuter Ede		MP for Mitcham & South Shields, Home Secretary	
Cuthbert Ellison		MP for Newcastle	
Henry Finch		MP for Canterbury	
James FitzGerald			
William Grimston		MP	
John Healey		MP (Yorkshire constituencies), Chancellor of the Exchequer, Defence Secretary	
John Hobart, 2nd Earl of Buckinghamshire		Lord Lieutenant of Ireland	
Sir John Jardine, 1st Baronet		MP for Roxburghshire	
Heng Swee Keat		Former Deputy Prime Minister of Singapore	
Lim Hng Kiang		Singaporean former politician; Former Minister for Trade and Industry	
John Kotelawala		Prime Minister of Ceylon	
Manmath Chandra Mallik		Barrister, writer, and Liberal Party politician	
Thomas Nelson Jr.		Governor of Virginia	
Zeid bin Ra'ad		Permanent Representative of Jordan to the United Nations	
Jan Smuts		Prime Minister of South Africa	
Sir William Spring, 2nd Baronet		MP for Suffolk	
Thomas Robinson, 2nd Baron Grantham		Foreign Secretary	
Thomas White		MP for East Retford	
Walter Wren			
Oliver Wright			
Ra'ad bin Zeid			

=== Judges ===
Name	Notability
Mian Abdul Rashid	Chief Justice of Pakistan
Mahomed Hameed Ullah Khan	Chief Justice of Hyderabad State

=== Science, technology, and mathematics ===
Name	Degree	Notability	Ref
John George Adami			
Charles Alfred Barber			
Jagdish Chandra Bose	BA 1884	Indian polymath; Known for his contributions to botany and microwave radio optics	
John Clark		British geneticist	
Charles Darwin		English naturalist and biologist; Known for describing the theory of evolution	
Francis Darwin			
C. J. Eliezer	PhD		
Martin Evans		British biologist; Nobel laureate	
Duncan Haldane		British physicist; Nobel laureate	
E. W. Hobson			
Leon Isserlis			
Archibald Liversidge		British chemist and mineralogist	
J. Robert Oppenheimer	DNG	American theoretical physicist; Known as the "father of the atomic bomb"	
Arthur Shipley		British zoologist	
Harry Marshall Ward	BA 1879; MA 1883; ScD 1892	British botanist, mycologist, and plant pathologist	

=== Sportspersons ===
Name	Degree	Notability	Ref
Paul Bircher		British rower; Olympic silver medalist	
Clifford Davis		Olympic athlete	
Richard Hutton		British cricketer	
Gilbert Jessop		British cricketer	
Tony Lewis		British cricketer and rugby player; Later sports journalist and president of the Marylebone Cricket Club	
Steve Palmer		British footballer	
David Robertson		British rugby union and golf player; Olympic bronze medalist	
Reggie Schwarz		South African cricketer	
Swaranjit Singh		Indian cricketer	
Ralph Starr		Olympic athlete	
Kieran West		British rower; Olympic gold medalist	
William Windham		British rower	

=== Others ===
Name	Degree	Notability	Ref
George Augustus Auden			
Walter Besant		Novelist and historian	
Frederic Chase			
John Wesley Hales			
John Scandrett Harford		Artist, abolitionist, and High Sheriff of Cardiganshire	
