= Gautam Brahmins =

Sub-group of Hindu Brahmins in India

These are Hindu Brahmins who affiliate either with the Gautam gotra and/or Gautam Dharmasutra and have their last name as Gautam.

== Etymology ==
The name Gautam or Gautama (Sanskrit: गौतम, /ɡɑw.t̪ɐ.mɐ/ IAST: Gautama) is related to Gotama (गोतम) and is also written as Gowthama, Gauthama or Goutama.

The name is a compounded word derived from the Sanskrit word “Gõ' (गो) and Sanskrit root "Tama:(तम:)". "Tama: (तम:)" (with a visarga substitute for final "s (स्)" in "Tamas (तमस्))" means, inter alia, "darkness". and "Gõ (गो)" means, inter alia, "rays of light". Together they mean dispelling darkness (of the night) by the rays of light (of the dawn). Metaphorically, the combined word indicates the one, who dispels ignorance by the brilliance of his spiritual knowledge.

"गोतम: (Gotama:)" and "गोतम (Gotama)" both signify the same word. The difference between "Gotama:" and "Gotama" in Sanskrit is grammatical. Gotama is the form of the stem or root (प्रातिपदिक) "गोतम्" whereas "Gotama:" is the form of the nominative singular case (प्रथमा विभक्ति). The final "a" in "Gotama:" is clearly pronounced while the final "a" in "Gotama" is not pronounced.

The name “Gotama” initially originated during the early Rigvedic times, and the name “Gautama” later developed as a vrddhi (au “औ” for o “ओ”) patronymic from Gotama. In the Rigveda Samhita the descendants of Gotama are also called Gotama while in later Vedic literature they are called Gautama.

== Distribution ==
Brahmins, having "Gautam" gotra, are found across India, from Kashmir to Kerala and Assam to Gujarat. Many Brahmins also follow the Gautam Dharmasutra. However, not all Brahmins, who affiliate with Gautam gotra and/ or follow the Gautam Dharamsutra, write their last name as "Gautam". But Brahmins, who also write their last name as "Gautam", are generally found in Punjab, Haryana, Himachal Pradesh, Rajasthan, Western Uttar Pradesh, Karnataka and Tamil Nadu in India. In Nepal also some Brahmins, who affiliate with Gautam gotra, write their last name as "Gautam". In the rest of the regions of India, Brahmins who affiliate with Gautam gotra and/ or follow the Gautam Dharamsutra, either write the generic Brahmin’s name (such as, Sharma etc.) or their "Vipra Shashanam विप्र शाषनम्" or "alla अल्ल" (such as, Mishra, Bhatt etc.) as their last name.

== Notable people ==
- Bana Malwala, Dewan Banna Mal Gautam, Dewan of Kapurthala Princely State and he built Shivala Dewan Banna Mal Mandir in Nawanshahr, Banna Mal Has two sons Namely Dewan Acchru Mal Gautam (Finance Minister of Kapurthala State) And Dewan Sundri Mal Gautam (Honorary Magistrate)
- Dhwani Gautam, Indian filmmaker
- Hari Gautam, Cardiologist, former VC of BHU and former UGC Chairman
- Mukesh Gautam, Indian film director and father of Surilie and Yami Gautam
- Navneet Gautam, Indian kabaddi player
- Ram Kumar Gautam, Indian politician
- Rashmi Gautam, Indian actress
- Ravindra Gautam, Indian film and television director
- Satish Kumar Gautam, Indian politician
- Shatrughan Gautam, Indian politician
- Sheela Gautam, Indian politician
- Srikant Gautam, Indian lyricist and film director
- Surilie Gautam, Indian film and television actress
- Umesh Gautam, Indian politician
- Yami Gautam, Indian actress
- Gaurav Gautam, Indian politician
