= Nawab Singh Chauhan =

Indian politician

Member of the Lok Sabha
- In office 1977–1979
- Preceded by: Shiv Kumar Shastri
- Succeeded by: Indra Kumari
- Constituency: Aligarh

Personal details
- Born: 16 December 1909 Jawan Vajidpur, Aligarh district, Uttar Pradesh
- Died: 4 April 1981 (aged 71) Aligarh
- Party: INC
- Children: Rajkumar Singh Chauhan; Surendra Singh Chauhan; Yogendra Singh Chauhan

Nawab Singh Chauhan (16 December 1909 – 4 April 1981) was an Indian politician. He was member of the 6th Lok Sabha from the Aligarh constituency. He used the pen name "Kanj" as poet.

== Early life and education ==
Chauhan was born in the village Jawan Vajidpur and lived at Jawan Sikandarpur, Aligarh district. Wife Haripiari Devi to father Thakur Bulwant Singh, and was educated up to intermediate level.

== Posts held ==
Notable posts Chauhan held include:

- Chairman, Zilla Parishad, Aligarh
- President, All-India, Railway Mail Service (R.M.S.)
- President, P&T Federation
- Member, All India Farmers Council (Bharat Krishak Samaj)
- Member, Uttar Pradesh Legislative Assembly (three years)
- Member, Rajya Sabha (11 years)

== Memorial ==
The Nawab Singh Chauhan Gramodaya Inter College, in the Kasimpur Village, (Kasimpur Town), Aligarh district, is named after him.
