= Mahendra Singh (politician) =

Indian politician

Mahendra Singh महेंद्र सिंह

Member of the Uttar Pradesh Legislative Assembly
- In office 2002–2012
- Preceded by: Ram Sakhi
- Succeeded by: Zameer Ullah Khan
- Constituency: Koil

Personal details
- Born: 31 December 1956 (age 69) Aligarh, Uttar Pradesh, India
- Citizenship: India
- Party: Azad Samaj Party (Kanshi Ram)
- Spouse: Raj Rani Singh
- Children: Deepak Singh, Mayank Singh, Rahul Singh
- Parent: Shiv Charan Singh (Father)
- Profession: Politician

Mahendra Singh (born 31 December 1956) is an Indian politician and He was a member of the 14th and the 15th Legislative Assemblies of Uttar Pradesh in the year 2002 and 2007, respectively. Mahendra Singh represented the Koil constituency of Uttar Pradesh and Minister of State in the Mayawati Ministry and is a member of the Bahujan Samaj Party political party. Citing disgruntlement with Former Chief Minister of Uttar Pradesh Ms. Mayawati, he quit the party in January 2018 . The party then released a statement claiming that he had been expelled for "anti-party activities". and Almost after 11 Month, He joined the Rashtriya Lok Dal having the Ajit Singh (politician) in December 2018, which he also left after 6 months because of some internal issue. and on 12-Sep-2021, in New Delhi, he joined Azad Samaj Party in presence of Bhim Army chief Chandrashekhar Azad Ravan and core member in the party.

== Early life and education ==
Mahendra Singh was born in the village in Rehsupur Aligarh, Uttar Pradesh, India in 1956. He belongs to the scheduled caste community (Jatav). Mahendra Singh's highest attained education is high school. Prior to joining politics, he was a businessperson by profession.

== Political career ==
Singh Joined the BSP Party in 1989, Singh was first fielded from Naseerpur Assembly seat in 1993 and later from Mangolpuri in New Delhi in 1998 elections. Mahendra Singh has been a MLA for two terms (2002 & 2007). During both his two terms, he represented Koil assembly constituency. He is a member of the Bahujan Samaj Party.

== Posts held ==
- Minister in Uttar Pradesh 2007 to 2012, in Mayawati government
- Member, 15th Legislative Assembly, Uttar Pradesh
- Member, 14th Legislative Assembly, Uttar Pradesh

== See also ==
- Koil
- Uttar Pradesh Legislative Assembly
- 2007 Uttar Pradesh Legislative Assembly election
- Politics of India
- Azad Samaj Party
- Bahujan Samaj Party
