= Aligarh Lok Sabha constituency =

Lok Sabha Constituency in Uttar Pradesh, India

Coordinates: 27.9°N 78.08°E

Aligarh UP-15
- Lok Sabha constituency
- Interactive Map Outlining Aligarh Lok Sabha constituency

Constituency details
- Country: India
- Region: North India
- State: Uttar Pradesh
- Assembly constituencies: Khair; Barauli; Atrauli; Koil; Aligarh
- Established: 1952
- Total electors: 19,97,121
- Reservation: None

Member of Parliament
- 18th Lok Sabha
- Incumbent Satish Kumar Gautam
- Party: BJP
- Alliance: NDA
- Elected year: 2024

Aligarh Lok Sabha Constituency (Hindi pronunciation: [əliːgəɽʱ]) is a Lok Sabha parliamentary constituency in Uttar Pradesh.

== Assembly segments ==
No	Name	District	Member	Party	2024 Lead
71	Khair (SC)	Aligarh	Surender Diler	BJP	SP
72	Barauli	Aligarh	Thakur Jaivir Singh	BJP	BJP
73	Atrauli	Aligarh	Sandeep Singh	BJP	BJP
75	Koil	Aligarh	Anil Parashar	BJP	SP
76	Aligarh	Aligarh	Mukta Raja	BJP	SP

== Members of parliament ==
Year	Member	Party
1952	Chand Singhal	Indian National Congress
1952	Nardeo Snatak	Indian National Congress
1957	Nardeo Snatak	Indian National Congress
1957	Jamal Khwaja	Indian National Congress
1962	Buddha Priya Maurya	Republican Party of India
1967	Shiv Kumar Shastri	Bharatiya Kranti Dal
1971	Shiv Kumar Shastri	Bharatiya Kranti Dal
1977	Nawab Singh Chauhan	Janata Party
1980	Indra Kumari	Janata Party (Secular)
1984	Usha Rani Tomar	Indian National Congress
1989	Satya Pal Malik	Janata Dal
1991	Sheela Gautam	Bharatiya Janata Party
1996	Sheela Gautam	Bharatiya Janata Party
1998	Sheela Gautam	Bharatiya Janata Party
1999	Sheela Gautam	Bharatiya Janata Party
2004	Bijendra Singh	Indian National Congress
2009	Raj Kumari Chauhan	Bahujan Samaj Party
2014	Satish Kumar Gautam	Bharatiya Janata Party
2019	Satish Kumar Gautam	Bharatiya Janata Party
2024	Satish Kumar Gautam	Bharatiya Janata Party

== Election results ==
=== General Election 2024 ===
2024 Indian general elections: Aligarh
Party	Candidate	Votes	%	±%
BJP	Satish Kumar Gautam	501,834	44.28	▼12.14
SP	Bijendra Singh	486,187	42.90	New
BSP	Hitendra Kumar	123,929	10.93	▼25.78
NOTA	None of the Above	4,934	0.44	▼0.10
Majority		15,647	1.38	▼18.33
Turnout		1,133,366	56.75	▼4.93
BJP hold		Swing		

=== 2019 ===
2019 Indian general elections: Aligarh
Party	Candidate	Votes	%	±%
BJP	Satish Kumar Gautam	656,215	56.42	+8.08
BSP	Ajeet Baliyan	426,954	36.71	+15.47
INC	Bijendra Singh	50,880	4.37	−1.52
NOTA	None of the Above	6,268	0.54	−0.08
Majority		229,261	19.71	−7.23
Turnout		1,163,950	61.68	
BJP hold		Swing	+9.44	

=== General elections 2014 ===
2014 Indian general elections: Aligarh
Party	Candidate	Votes	%	±%
BJP	Satish Kumar Gautam	514,624	48.34	+29.99
BSP	Arvind Kumar Singh	227,886	21.40	−6.55
SP	Zafar Alam	226,284	21.25	−4.31
INC	Bijendra Singh	62,674	5.89	−18.06
AAP	Mohd. Sabir Rahi	8,978	0.84	+0.84
NOTA	None of the Above	6,183	0.58	+0.58
Majority		286,736	26.94	+24.55
Turnout		1,064,697	59.38	+7.94
BJP gain from BSP		Swing	+20.39	

== See also ==
- Aligarh
- Aligarh Assembly constituency
- List of constituencies of the Lok Sabha
