= Satish Kumar Gautam =

Indian politician

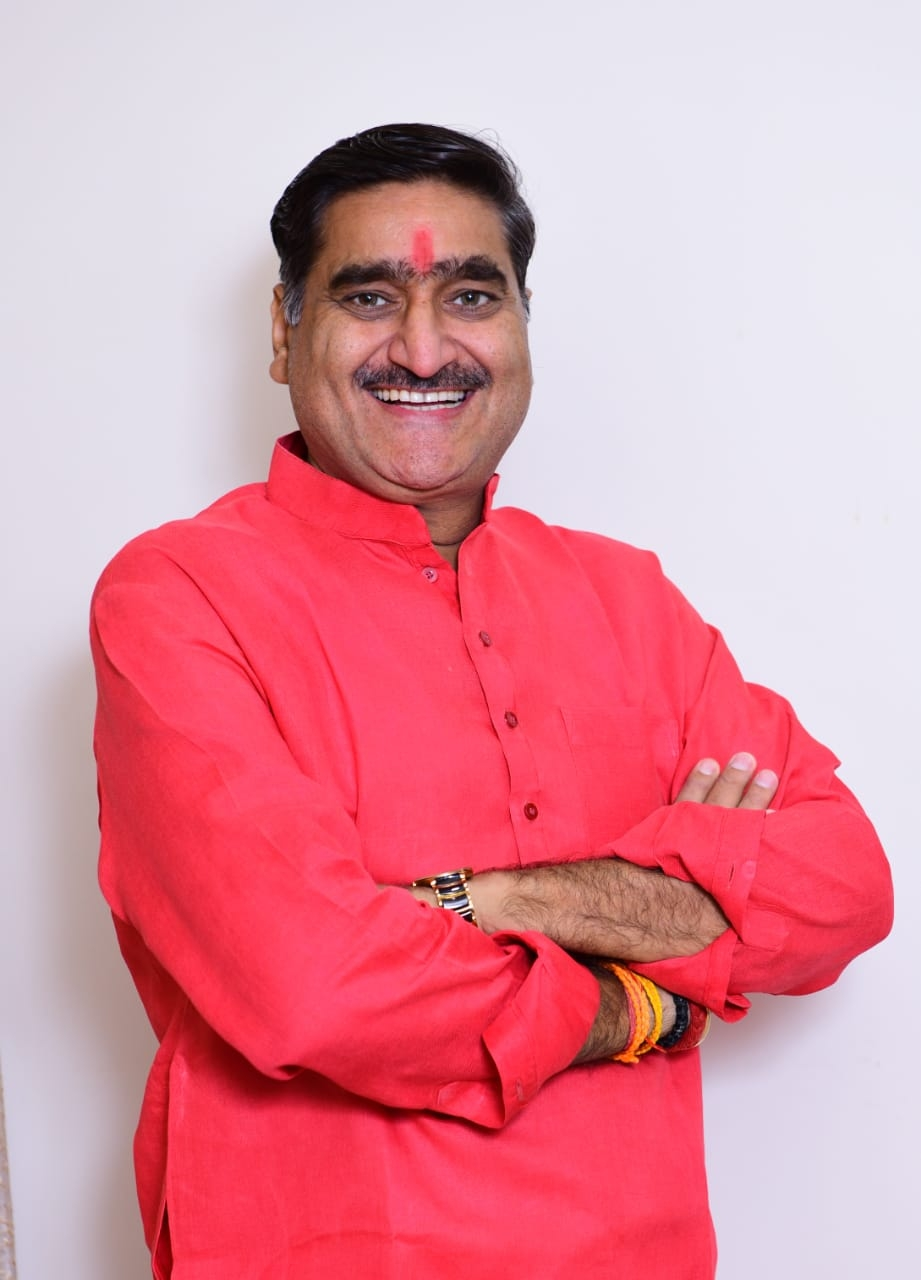

Member of Parliament, Lok Sabha
- Incumbent
- Assumed office 16 May 2014
- Preceded by: Raj Kumari Chauhan
- Constituency: Aligarh

Personal details
- Born: 1 July 1972 (age 54) Aligarh, Uttar Pradesh, India
- Party: Bharatiya Janata Party
- Spouse: Meenakshi Gautam
- Children: 2
- Occupation: Businessperson
- As of 17 December, 2016

Satish Kumar Gautam (born 1 July 1972; Hindi pronunciation: [sət̪iːʃ kʊmaːɾ gɔːt̪əm]) is an Indian politician from Uttar Pradesh. He is a three time Member of Parliament from Aligarh Lok Sabha constituency from 2014 representing Bharatiya Janata Party.

== Early life ==
Gautam is a resident of Koil, Aligarh district, Uttar Pradesh. He was born in a Gautam Brahmin family. He was born to Damodar Gautam and Ram Devi. He completed his matriculation in 1988 at Shir Krishna High School, Patloni, Mathura. He married Meenakshi Gautam on 30 April 1993 and they have two children. He is fond of sports, particularly Kabaddi.

== Political career ==
Gautam became an MP for the first time winning the 16th Lok Sabha. He won from Aligarh Lok Sabha constituency representing Bharatiya Janata Party in the 2014 Indian general election in Uttar Pradesh. He polled 5,14,622 votes and defeated his nearest rival, Arvind Kumar Singh of Bahujan Samaj Party, by a huge margin of 2,86,736 votes. During his term, he was a member of the Standing Committee on Chemicals and fertilizers from September 2014 to July 2015. He retained the seat in May 2019 winning the 2019 Indian general election in Uttar Pradesh, again on BJP ticket from the same constituency. He was elected for the third time winning the 2024 Indian general election in Uttar Pradesh from the same constituency. In 2024, he polled 501,834 votes and defeated his nearest rival, Bijendra Singh of Indian National Congress, by a margin of 15,647 votes.
