= Satya Pal Malik =

Indian politician (1946–2025)

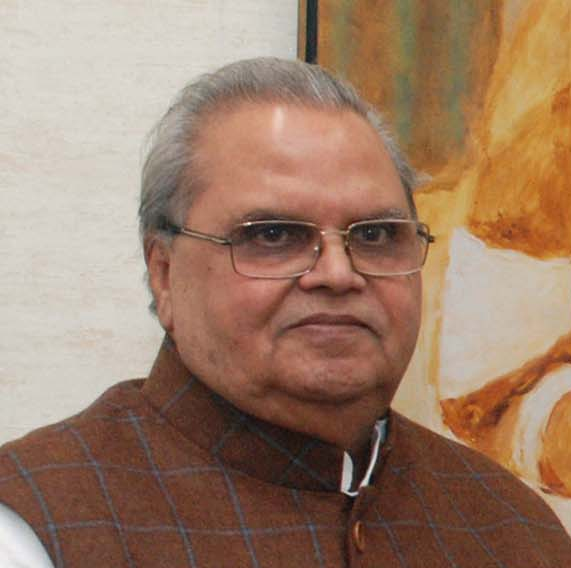
- Malik in 2018

19th Governor of Meghalaya
- In office 18 August 2020 – 3 October 2022
- Chief Minister: Conrad Sangma
- Preceded by: Tathagata Roy
- Succeeded by: B. D. Mishra

18th Governor of Goa
- In office 3 November 2019 – 18 August 2020
- Chief Minister: Pramod Sawant
- Preceded by: Mridula Sinha
- Succeeded by: Bhagat Singh Koshyari (additional charge)

13th Governor of Jammu and Kashmir
- In office 23 August 2018 – 30 October 2019
- President: Ram Nath Kovind
- Preceded by: Narinder Nath Vohra
- Succeeded by: Office abolished (G. C. Murmu as Lieutenant Governor)

Governor of Odisha Additional charge
- In office 21 March 2018 – 28 May 2018
- Chief Minister: Naveen Patnaik
- Preceded by: S. C. Jamir
- Succeeded by: Ganeshi Lal

25th Governor of Bihar
- In office 30 September 2017 – 21 August 2018
- Chief Minister: Nitish Kumar
- Preceded by: Keshari Nath Tripathi
- Succeeded by: Lalji Tandon

Union Minister of State for Parliamentary Affairs and Tourism
- In office 23 April 1990 – 10 November 1990
- Prime Minister: V. P. Singh
- Preceded by: P. Namgyal
- Succeeded by: M. M. Jacob

Member of Parliament, Lok Sabha
- In office 1989–1991
- Preceded by: Usha Rani Tomar
- Succeeded by: Sheela Gautam
- Constituency: Aligarh, Uttar Pradesh

Member of Parliament, Rajya Sabha
- In office 1980–1989
- Constituency: Uttar Pradesh

Member of the Uttar Pradesh Legislative Assembly
- In office 1974–1977
- Preceded by: Chaudhry Vikram Singh
- Succeeded by: Ismail
- Constituency: Baghpat

Personal details
- Born: 24 July 1946 Meerut, United Provinces, British India (present-day Bagpat, Uttar Pradesh, India)
- Died: 5 August 2025 (aged 79) Delhi, India
- Party: Bharatiya Janata Party
- Other political affiliations: Bharatiya Kranti Dal; Janata Dal; Indian National Congress; Lok Dal; Samajwadi Party
- Spouse: Iqbal Malik
- Education: Meerut University (B.Sc, LLB)

Satya Pal Malik (24 July 1946 – 5 August 2025) was an Indian politician, lawyer and statesman who served as governor of five Indian states, namely Bihar, Odisha, Jammu and Kashmir, Goa, and Meghalaya.

His first prominent stint as a politician was as a member of Uttar Pradesh Legislative Assembly during 1974–77. He represented Uttar Pradesh in Rajya Sabha from 1980 to 1986 and 1986–89. He was member of the 9th Lok Sabha from Aligarh, from 1989 to 1991, as member of Janata Dal. He was the Governor of Bihar from October 2017 to August 2018. On 21 March 2018, he was also given additional charge to serve as Governor of Odisha up to 28 May 2018. In August 2018, he was appointed Governor to the erstwhile state of Jammu and Kashmir, becoming its 10th and last Governor, and served till October 2019. During his tenure, in August 2019, the state's special status was revoked and it was reorganised into two union territories. Later, he moved to Goa, becoming the 18th governor, and also served as the 21st Governor of Meghalaya, until October 2022.

== Background ==
Satya Pal Malik was born to Budh Singh on 24 July 1946 in Hisawada, a village in the Meerut district of the United Provinces of British India (now in the Bagpat district of Uttar Pradesh, India) into a Hindu Jat family.

Malik pursued his Bachelor of Science and Bachelor of Laws degrees from Meerut University. In 1968–69, Malik was elected as the students union president, commencing his political career. He was married to Idbal Malik.

Malik died after a prolonged illness on 5 August 2025, at the age of 79.

== Politics ==
=== Early state politics ===
Malik was first elected to any public office as a member of legislative assembly from Baghpat after he successfully contested the election as member of Charan Singh's Bharatiya Kranti Dal. He won the election by receiving 42.4% of the votes cast and defeating his nearest rival Acharya Deepankar of the Communist party of India who got 31.6% of the total votes cast. Later, after the formation of Bharatiya Lok Dal, he joined the party and became the general secretary of Lok Dal.

=== National politics ===
- 1980–89: Rajya Sabha Member from Uttar Pradesh
- 1989–91: Member of Lok Sabha from Aligarh, on Janata Dal ticket
- 1996: Lost Lok Sabha Election from Aligarh on SP ticket, came fourth with only 40,789 votes.
- 2012: Appointed National Vice-president of BJP

=== Governor of States ===
- 30 September 2017 – 21 August 2018: Governor of Bihar
- 21 March 2018 – 28 August 2018: Governor of Odisha Additional Charge
- 23 August 2018 – 30 October 2019: Governor of Jammu and Kashmir
- 3 November 2019 – 18 August 2020: Governor of Goa
- 18 August 2020 – 3 October 2022: Governor of Meghalaya

== Political views ==
=== Support for farmers' protest ===
On 8 November 2021, Malik was invited to Global Jat Summit and in his speech, he warned the Indian government regarding the 2020–2021 Indian farmers' protest and said "you will not be able to overcome the Sikhs. The Guru's four children were slaughtered, but the Guru refused to surrender. You cannot defeat the Jats as well."

He also added, "Indira Gandhi knew that she would be killed and she was killed [for ordering Bluestar]. They killed General Vaidya in Pune [for leading Bluestar] and Michael O'Dwyer in London [Lieutenant Governor Of Punjab during Jallianwala Bagh massacre]. I have even said that don't test the patience of the Sikh community." This was used as an outro snippet on the controversial song SYL by Sidhu Moose Wala.

=== Views on Pulwama attack and Narendra Modi ===
On 14 April 2023, in an interview to Karan Thapar, Malik gave his views on Pulwama attack and Narendra Modi.

1. Narendra Modi had no dislike for corruption and has taken no action against those alleged to be involved in corruption because they were close to him.
2. The former J&K governor had also made serious claims about mistakes that led to the Pulwama attack in 2019, including instructions by Modi and NSA Ajit Doval for him to stay quiet on the mistakes and that he "realised that all the onus of the attack will be put on Pakistan".
3. “CRPF people (had) asked for aircraft to ferry their people because such a large convoy generally doesn’t travel by road,” Malik said, adding the request was made to the Home Ministry but “they refused to give”.
4. Malik also said that there was grave intelligence failure in the Pulwama incident because the car carrying 300 kilograms of RDX explosives had come from Pakistan but was travelling around the roads and villages of Jammu and Kashmir for 10–15 days without being detected and without anyone knowing.

== See also ==
- Balbir Singh Rajewal
- Rakesh Tikait

Uttar Pradesh Legislative Assembly
Preceded by Chaudhry Vikram Singh	Member of the Legislative Assembly for Baghpat; 1974–1977	Succeeded by Ismail
Rajya Sabha
Preceded by	Member of Parliament from Uttar Pradesh; 1980–1989	Succeeded by Alia Zuberi
Lok Sabha
Preceded by Usha Rani Tomar	Member of Parliament for Aligarh; 1989–1991	Succeeded by Sheela Gautam
Political offices
Preceded by Keshari Nath Tripathi	Governor of Bihar; 4 October 2017 – 21 August 2018	Succeeded by Lal Ji Tandon
Preceded by S. C. Jamir	Governor of Odisha; 21 March 2018 – 28 May 2018 (Additional Charge)	Succeeded by Ganeshi Lal
Preceded by Narinder Nath Vohra	Governor of Jammu and Kashmir; 23 August 2018 – 31 October 2019	Succeeded by G. C. Murmu As Lieutenant Governor
Preceded by Mridula Sinha	Governor of Goa; 25 October 2019 – 18 August 2020	Succeeded by Bhagat Singh Koshyari; Additional Charge
Preceded by Tathagata Roy	Governor of Meghalaya; 18 August 2020 – 4 October 2022	Succeeded by B. D. Mishra
