= Indra Kumari =

Indian politician

MP
- In office 7th Lok Sabha 1980–1984
- Preceded by: Nawab Singh Chauhan
- Succeeded by: Usha Rani Tomar
- Constituency: Aligarh (Uttar Pradesh)

Personal details
- Born: 15 January 1947 (age 79) Jagamanpur State, Uttar Pradesh, India
- Died: Gabhana state, (aligarh) Uttar Pradesh, India
- Citizenship: India
- Party: Janta Party (S)
- Spouse: Raja Chetanraj Singh Gabhana state
- Children: 2 sons
- Parent(s): Captain Raja Virendra Shah (father); Ranisab Roopju raja (mother)
- Education: Loreto Convent, Lucknow
- Occupation: Politician

Maharani Indra Kumari was a member of the 6th Lok Sabha of India. She represented the Aligarh (Lok Sabha constituency) of Uttar Pradesh and is a member of the Janta Party (S) political party. She was princess of Jagamanpur State of District Jalaun, Uttar Pradesh daughter of Captain Raja Virendra Shah and wife of Raja Chetanraj Singh of Gabhana State. She was educated at Loreto Convent at Lucknow.
