= Aligarh Assembly constituency =

Legislative Assembly constituency in Uttar Pradesh State, India

Aligarh
- Constituency No. 76 for the Uttar Pradesh Legislative Assembly

Constituency details
- Country: India
- Region: North India
- State: Uttar Pradesh
- District: Aligarh
- Lok Sabha constituency: Aligarh
- Total electors: 395,352
- Reservation: None

Member of Legislative Assembly
- 18th Uttar Pradesh Legislative Assembly
- Incumbent Mukta Raja
- Party: Bharatiya Janata Party
- Elected year: 2022

Aligarh (Hindi pronunciation: [əliːgəɽʱ]) is a constituency of the Aligarh district of Uttar Pradesh (U.P.). VVPAT facilities with electronic voting machines (EVM) will be used in 2017 in U.P. assembly polls.

== Legislative Assembly members ==
Election	Member	Party
1957	Anant Ram Verma	Indian National Congress
1962	Abdul Basir Khan	Republican Party of India
1967	Indra Pal Singh	Bharatiya Jana Sangh
1969	Ahmad Loot Khan	Indian National Congress
1974	Indra Pal Singh	Bharatiya Jana Sangh
1977	Moziz Ali Beg	Janata Party
1980	Khwaja Haleem	Janata Party (Secular)
1985	Capt.Baldev Singh	Indian National Congress
1989	Krishna Kumar Navman	Bharatiya Janata Party
1991	Krishna Kumar Navman	Bharatiya Janata Party
1993	Krishna Kumar Navman	Bharatiya Janata Party
1996	Abdul Khaliq	Samajwadi Party
2002	Vivek Bansal	Indian National Congress
2007	Zameer Ullah Khan	Samajwadi Party
2012	Zafar Alam	Samajwadi Party
2017	Sanjeev Raja	Bharatiya Janata Party
2022	Mukta Raja	Bharatiya Janata Party

== Election results ==
=== 2027 ===
2027 Uttar Pradesh Legislative Assembly election: Aligarh
Party	Candidate	Votes	%	±%
INDIA				
NDA				
BSP				
NOTA	None of the above			
Majority				
Turnout				
gain from		Swing		

=== 2022 ===
2022 Uttar Pradesh Legislative Assembly election: Aligarh
Party	Candidate	Votes	%	±%
BJP	Mukta Raja	120,389	47.66	▲1.44
SP	Zafar Alam	107,603	42.6	▲2.65
BSP	Razia Khan	18,273	7.23	▼3.21
INC	Imtiaz Ali	2,292	0.91	
NOTA	None of the above	1,056	0.42	▼0.14
Majority		12,786	5.06	▼1.21
Turnout		252,587	63.89	▼2.58
BJP hold		Swing		

=== 2017 ===
Uttar Pradesh Legislative Assembly Election, 2017: Aligarh
Party	Candidate	Votes	%	±%
BJP	Sanjeev Raja	113,752	46.22	
SP	Zafar Alam	98,312	39.95	
BSP	Mohd. Arif	25,704	10.44	
Swatantra Jantaraj Party	Rajkumar	3,325	1.35	
NOTA	None of the above	1,375	0.56	
Majority		15,440	6.27	
Turnout		246,114	66.47	

== See also ==
- List of constituencies of the Uttar Pradesh Legislative Assembly
- Aligarh district
