= Tour de Kalinga =

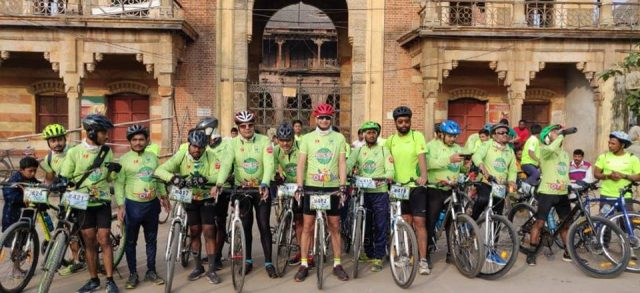

Race details
- Date: December
- Region: Bhubaneswar, Odisha, India
- Local name: Konark International Cyclothon
- Type: Cycling

History
- First edition: 29 November 2015; 10 years ago

Tour de Kalinga (formerly known as Konark International Cyclothon) is an annual Cyclothon primarily held in Odisha a state in India. It has been described as "the longest Cyclothon of Asia. Tour de Kalinga was formerly known as Konark International Cylothon was founded by Sudhir Kumar Dash, Founder of Roots of Odisha Foundation, Rashmi Ranjan Parida is the co-founder.

== History ==
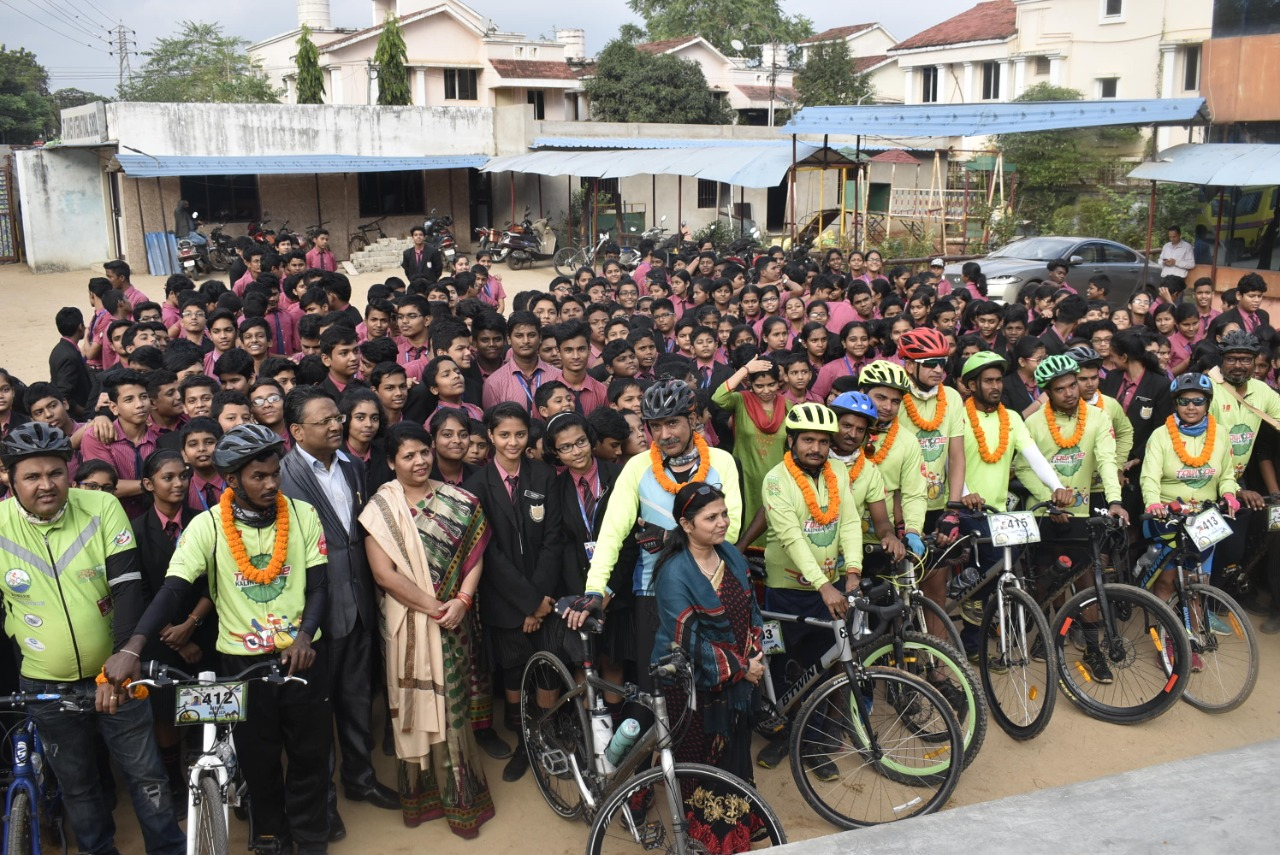
Tour De Kalinga cyclists

Tour de Kalinga was first organized in 2015. Initially it was held in Konark Puri Marine drive. As the tour gained popularity, the race was lengthened from Bhubaneswar to Eastern Ghat valley and concluded at Bhubaneswar. Riders from all over the world began to participate in the Cylothon each year. Film maker Nila Madav Panda, former Indian Hockey Team Captain Dilip Tirkey, Ollywood actor Siddhanta Mahapatra, Mountaineer Jogabyasa Bhoi, Sand artist Manas Kumar Sahoo, Scuba diver Sabir Bux, Arjuna Awardee Cyclist Minati Mohapatra joined the first edition of Konark International Cylothon.

== 2015 ==
Konark International Cylothon started in 2015 at Konark. The cyclothon started from Konark and concluded at Puri.

== 2016 ==
Second Tour de Kalinga (Konark International Cyclothon) held on December 17 from here as a part of the let's Pedal Movement. It started from Bhubaneswar and concluded in Delhi covering a distance of 2,000 km.

== 2017 ==
The 3rd edition of Tour de Kalinga (Konark International Cyclothon) started in Bhubaneswar on December 23 and concluded at Koraput on December 29.

== 2018 ==
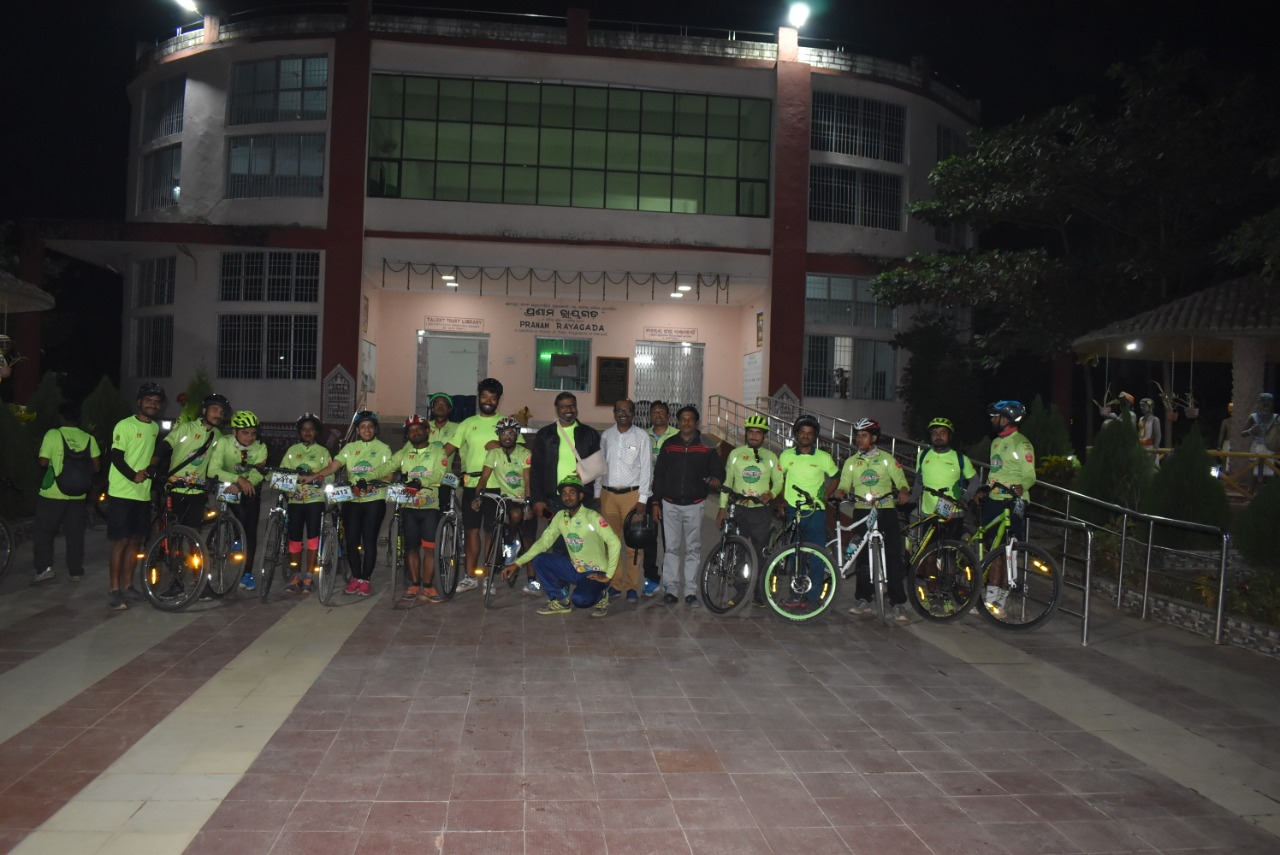
Tour De Kalinga cyclists

4th Tour De Kalinga started on December 8, 2018. It concluded on December 19 at Bhubaneswar. Odisha Governor Prof. Ganeshi Lal inaugurated the fourth Tour De Kalinga in Bhubaneswar.

== 2019 ==
5th Tour De Kalinga started on December 7, 2019. It concluded on December 20 at Bhubaneswar. Odisha Governor Prof. Ganeshi Lal inaugurated the fifth Tour De Kalinga in Bhubaneswar.
