= Najeeb Jung =

Indian civil servant

The Honourable Najeeb Jung
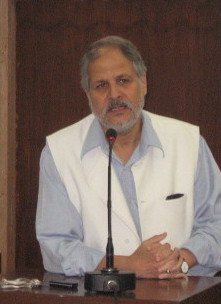
- Jung in 2011

18th Lieutenant Governor of Delhi
- In office 9 July 2013 – 22 December 2016
- President: Pranab Mukherjee
- Chief Minister: Sheila Dikshit; Arvind Kejriwal
- Preceded by: Tejendra Khanna
- Succeeded by: Anil Baijal

13th Vice-Chancellor of Jamia Millia Islamia
- In office 2009–2013
- Preceded by: Mushirul Hasan
- Succeeded by: Talat Ahmad

Personal details
- Born: 18 January 1951 (age 75) Delhi, India
- Education: St. Columba's School; St. Stephen's College, Delhi; Delhi University; London School of Economics

Najeeb Jung (born 18 January 1951) is a retired Indian Administrative Service officer who served as the 20th Lieutenant Governor of Delhi from July 2013 to December 2016. He previously served as the 13th Vice-Chancellor of the Jamia Millia Islamia from 2009 to 2013.

== Early life and education ==
Najeeb Jung's grandparents served as the chief justice and chief engineer in the court of the last Nizam of Hyderabad. His great grandfather, Moulvi Samee Ullah Khan was one of the co-founders of the Aligarh Muslim University.

Jung was born and raised in Delhi, where he attended St Columba's School, New Delhi. He then did his B.A. (Hons) and M.A. in History from St. Stephen's College, Delhi. He later studied at the London School of Economics and was awarded Master of Science in Social Policy and Planning in Developing Countries from University of London.

== Career ==
Jung joined Indian Administrative Service in 1973 and was encadered into the Madhya Pradesh cadre. He served as Private Secretary to Madhavrao Scindia, Minister for Railways and had been Director in Government of India in the Ministry of Steel. He later served as Joint Secretary to Government of India in the Ministry of Petroleum and Natural Gas from year 1994 to 1999. He resigned from the service in 1999.

He later served as a Senior Energy Specialist at the Asian Development Bank, as Fellow at the Oxford Institute for Energy Studies, University of Oxford and as Director for Energy Research at the Observer Research Foundation, New Delhi.

He has published several monographs and reports on the energy sector and is a regular contributor to national newspapers on education and social issues. He was the Chairman of a Core Committee of Vice-Chancellors appointed by the Ministry of Human Resource Development (India) to examine various aspects of higher education, Chairman of a Committee to review the existing schemes for enhancing participation of minorities in higher education, Member of the Special Task Force set up by the Ministry of Home Affairs (India) to suggest developmental options for the Jammu region of the State of Jammu and Kashmir, Member of the Senate of the Indian Institute of Technology Kanpur, (IITK) and several other Committees at the national level.

He quit the service in 1999 after his stint as joint secretary (exploration) in the Ministry of Petroleum and Natural Gas (India). Jung played a crucial role in the privatization of ONGC's Panna-Mukta oilfield that went to a consortium of Reliance-ONGC and British Gas. Jung also had a stint in the Asian Development Bank. Later, he became director, energy research, in Reliance-run Observer Research Foundation. In 2009 September, he became the Vice Chancellor of the Jamia Millia Islamia. In October 2010 he endorsed the judgement of Allahabad High Court on Babri Masjid Ram Janmabhoomi suit.

== Lieutenant governor ==
In July 2013, he became the Lieutenant Governor of Delhi, replacing another former IAS officer Tejendra Khanna. Since taking office Jung had been involved in an ongoing jurisdictional dispute with Chief Minister Arvind Kejriwal, the head of the Delhi Legislative Assembly. Although Delhi is a union territory it has its own organic act, National Capital Territory of Delhi Act (1992), and its own legislature, the Chief Minister and the Lt. Governor were unable able to interpret the operating rules in the same way. In a surprise move, he submitted his resignation from the post on 22 December 2016.

Government offices
Preceded by Tejendra Khanna	Lieutenant Governor of Delhi; 9 July 2013 – 22 December 2016	Succeeded by Anil Baijal
