= Thakur Jaivir Singh =

Indian politician

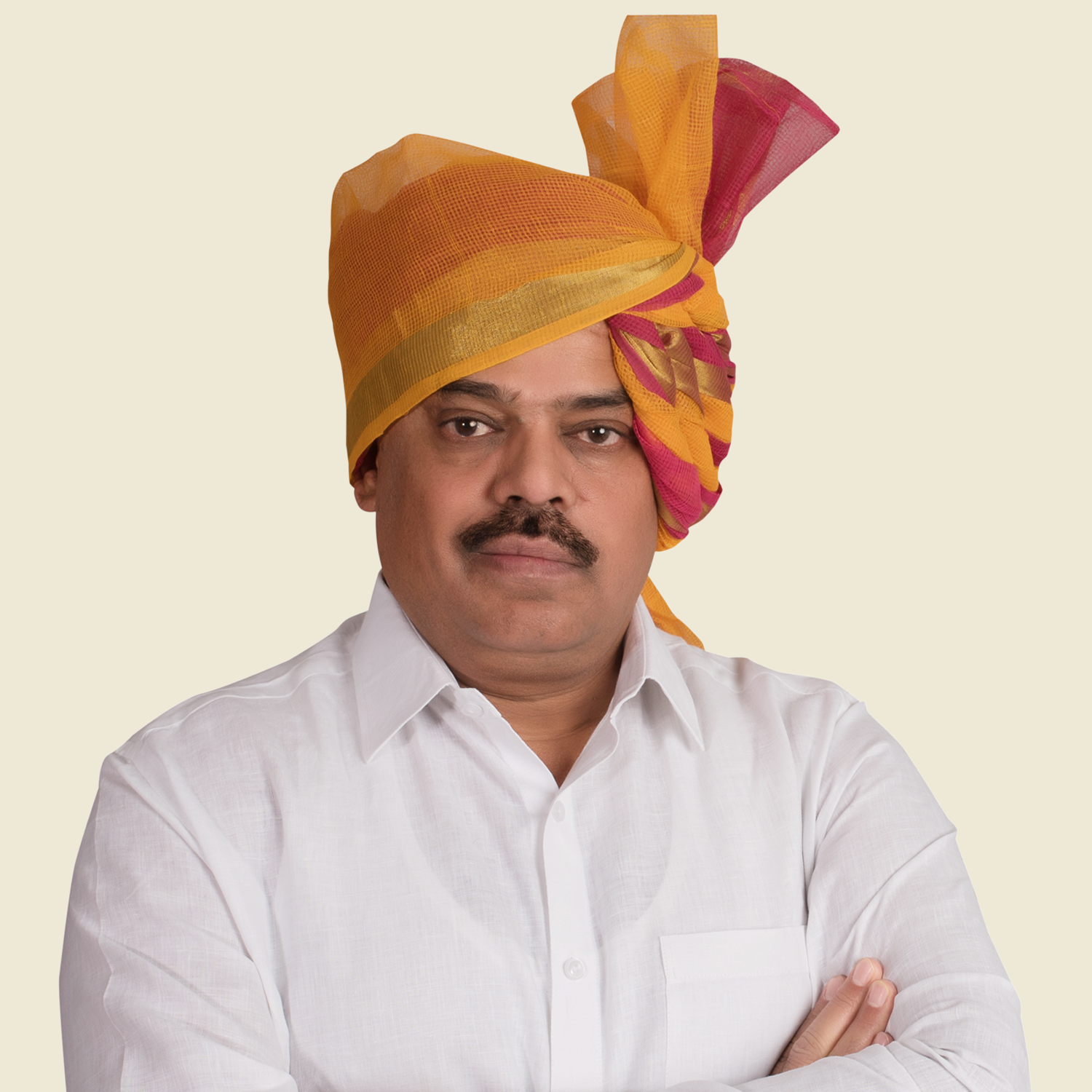

Member of the Uttar Pradesh legislative assembly
- Incumbent
- Assumed office 10 March 2022
- In office 2002–2012
- Constituency: Barauli

Member of the Uttar Pradesh legislative council
- In office 2018–2022
- In office 2012–2017

Personal details
- Born: 1 November 1964 (age 61)
- Party: Bharatiya Janata Party (2017-present; 1990-2000)
- Other political affiliations: BSP (2001-2017)
- Spouse: Raj Kumari Chauhan (m. 1986)
- Children: 4 sons
- Profession: Politician
- Website: www.thakurjaivirsingh.com

Thakur Jaivir Singh is an Indian politician from Bharatiya Janata Party in Uttar Pradesh. He is elected from the Barauli constituency in the Uttar Pradesh Legislative Assembly in 2022. He registered the highest margin win of 92,000 votes among the rural constituencies in the 2022 Uttar Pradesh Legislative Assembly election. Thakur Jaivir Singh was a Cabinet minister in the Uttar Pradesh government in the year 2002 & again between 2007 and 2012 and represented Barauli seat.

His wife Raj Kumari Chauhan was Member Of Parliament in the 15th Lok Sabha from Aligarh (Lok Sabha constituency). His son, Arvind Kumar Singh is the youngest candidate in India Lok Sabha MP 2014, contesting from Aligarh.

Earlier in 2017 he vacated his seat for Yogi Adityanath to become an MLC after Yogi Adityanath was chosen as the Chief Minister of Uttar Pradesh. He was elected again as MLC on 6 May 2018, on a BJP ticket.

== Political career ==
S.No	Office	Constituency	Year
1	Member of the Legislative Assembly, Uttar Pradesh Legislative Assembly	Barauli	2022
2	Member of Legislative council		2018
3	Member of Legislative council		2012
4	Member of the Legislative Assembly, Uttar Pradesh Legislative Assembly	Barauli	2007
5	Member of the Legislative Assembly, Uttar Pradesh Legislative Assembly	Barauli	2002

== Positions held ==
S.No	Position	Tenure
1	Cabinet Minister, Uttar Pradesh Council of Ministers	2007-2012
2	Cabinet Minister, Uttar Pradesh Council of Ministers	2002
