= Jamal Khwaja =

Indian philosopher and politician (1926–2020)

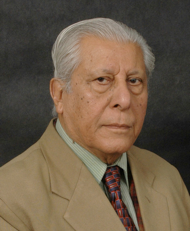

Member of Parliament, Lok Sabha
- In office 1957–1962
- Preceded by: Nardeo Snatak
- Succeeded by: Budha Priya Maurya
- Constituency: Aligarh

Personal details
- Born: 12 August 1926; Delhi, British India
- Died: 25 December 2020 (aged 94); Aligarh, Uttar Pradesh, India
- Education: Aligarh Muslim University
- Occupation: Indian philosopher
- Website: www.JamalKhwaja.com

Jamal Khwaja (or, Ahmad Jamal Yusuf Khwaja, 12 August 1926 (Note: Jamal Khwaja was born in August 1926. However most official documents show his date of birth as 1928. This error somehow crept into the record and has become a source of confusion amongst family and friends ever since.) – 25 December 2020) was an Indian philosopher.

Between 1957 and 1962, he was a Member of Parliament for Aligarh. In 1962, he left politics and resumed his career as an academic. In 1980, he was appointed the Dean of the Faculty of Arts at Aligarh Muslim University.

The philosophical work of Khwaja has two facets: an analysis of the nature and causes of philosophical disagreement, and second, analysis of the religious dimension of life, with special reference to Islam. Jamal Khwaja's basic approach to philosophy and religion was irenic rather than polemical.

== Family background ==
Khwaja was born on 12 August 1926 in Delhi, India in his maternal grandmother's house. His father Abdul Majeed Khwaja was a prominent lawyer and educationist and was involved in the Indian Freedom Movement. His mother was Begum Khursheed Khwaja. His paternal grandfather Khwaja Muhammad Yusuf was involved in the independence movement and maternal grandfather Mahomed Hameed Ullah Khan was a prominent judge.

== Education ==
Soon after the birth of Jamal Khwaja, his father moved to Allahabad, and resumed his legal practice at the Allahabad High Court. Jamal Khwaja's earliest schooling took place in Saint Mary's Convent, Allahabad. He learnt the Quran as well as the Persian language in the traditional manner, at home, from the accomplished scholar Maulvi Haidry. Later he joined the prestigious Government Intermediate College, Allahabad.

In 1942 his father, Abdul Majeed Khwaja had a serious heart attack. In 1943 the family moved back to the ancestral home at Aligarh, where Jamal Khwaja joined the Aligarh Muslim University, formerly the Muhammadan Anglo-Oriental College where many of his family members had attended or taught.

After completing his M.A. in Philosophy from the Aligarh Muslim University, Jamal Khwaja obtained an honours degree from his father's old alma mater, Christ's College at the University of Cambridge, in England. Later he spent a year studying the German language and European existentialism at the University of Münster, in Germany.

At Cambridge University he was deeply influenced by the work of C.D. Broad, Wittgenstein and John Wisdom and his college tutor, Ian Ramsey who later became Professor of Christian Religion at Oxford University and subsequently Bishop of Durham. It was Ramsey's influence that taught Khwaja to appreciate the inner beauty and power of pure spirituality. At Cambridge he also came to appreciate the value of linguistic analysis as a tool of philosophical inquiry and to combine the quest for clarity with the insights and depth of the existentialist approach to religion and spirituality.

== Career ==
In 1953 Jamal Khwaja was appointed lecturer in Philosophy at his alma mater, Aligarh Muslim University (AMU).

Before he could immerse himself in serious academic work, his family tradition of public work pulled him into a brief spell of active politics under Jawaharlal Nehru: his father's contemporary at Cambridge University and the first Prime Minister of India. Nehru was keen to rejuvenate his team of colleagues by inducting fresh blood into the Indian National Congress. Jamal Khwaja was one of the young persons he chose. He thus became one of the youngest entrants into the Indian Parliament as an elected member of the Lok Sabha from 1957 to 1962.

During his time in politics, he learned to distinguish between ideals and illusions, and chose to continue to pursue academia instead of becoming more involved in the political world. Returning to his alma mater in 1962, he resumed teaching and research in the Philosophy of Religion. Since then Khwaja has lived a quiet life at Aligarh.

He was Dean of the Faculty of Arts and was a member of important committees of the University Grants Commission and the Indian Council for Philosophical Research before retiring as Professor and Chairman of the Department of Philosophy in 1988. He frequently and actively participated in national seminars at the Indian Institute of Advanced Study, Shimla.

== Summary of general accomplishments ==
1. Member of Parliament (Lok Sabha), 1957–62.
2. Delivered the Schopenhauer Centenary Lecture at Max Mueller Bhawan, New Delhi, 1959–60.
3. Member, Central Advisory Board of Anthropology, 1959–62.
4. Joint Secretary, Hindustani Culture Society, founded by Pandit Sunder Lal, Tej Bahadur Sapru, A.M. Khwaja et al., 1964–69.
5. Member, Government of India Delegation to the International Islamic Conference, Kuala Lumpur, Malaysia in 1969.
6. Member, University Grants Commission Panel on Philosophy and of Visiting Committee to University of Mumbai (60), 1978–82.
7. Head of the Department of Philosophy, Aligarh Muslim University, Aligarh, 1978–84.
8. Dean, Faculty of Arts and Ex-Officio Member of the Executive Council, Aligarh Muslim University, 1980–82.
9. Member of the Governing Body of the Indian Council for Philosophical Research, New Delhi, 1984.
10. Governor's Nominee on the Senate of Himachal University, Shimla.
11. Member, Editorial Board, Indian Philosophical Quarterly, Pune.

== Works ==
His major works include Five Approaches to Philosophy, Quest for Islam, and Authenticity and Islamic Liberalism. His autobiography, The Vision of An Unknown Indian is slated for publication in 2011.

He is also the author of numerous scholarly articles and essays.

His work is dominated by the passionate quest to answer two questions: "What does it mean to be an authentic Muslim?" and secondly, how should a believer understand and interpret the 'Word of God' in our times?"

His first work, Five Approaches to Philosophy, is an analysis of the nature and causes of philosophical disagreement, while his second, principal work, Quest for Islam, analyses the religious dimension of life.

Jamal Khwaja's basic approach to philosophy and religion was irenic rather than polemical, and he attempted to transcend the traditional polarities of Rationalism and Empiricism, Idealism and Materialism, Theism and Atheism. This irenic approach flows from a critical methodology of philosophy.

== Major conferences and lectures ==
- Leader of the Government of India Cultural Delegation to Afghanistan, 1960.
- He was one of the official Indian delegates at the Pakistan Philosophical Congress held at Peshawar in April 1963.
- He was one of the official Indian delegates at the International Islamic Conference Kuala Lumpur, Malaysia in 1967.
- He was invited to present a series of three memorial lectures at the Khuda Bakhsh Oriental Library, Patna during the mid 1980s.
- Participated in the seminar: The Concept and Role of Tolerance in Indian Culture, organised by the Center of Advance Study in Philosophy, Madras, 1985.
- Director, Philosophical Dialogue between Ulema and Modern Scholars, sponsored by Indian Council for Philosophical Research, New Delhi, 1988.
- He was one of the official Indian delegates at the World Philosophical Congress Brighton, United Kingdom (1988).
- He frequently and actively participated in national seminars at the Indian Institute of Advanced Study, Shimla. (57)

== Personal life ==
In 1949 he married his cousin Hamida, the daughter of General Muhammad Akbar Khan and Qudsia Begum. They had three sons, Jawahar Kabir, Rajen Habib, Nasser Navin and one daughter, Geeta Anjum. He visited the US and several countries in Western Europe. He performed Hajj in 2005.

== See also ==
- Christ's College, Cambridge
- Irfan Habib
- Khwaja Abdul Hamied
- Waheed Akhtar
