= Chand Singhal =

Indian politician

Chandra Singhal (died in 1989) was a member of Aligarh (Lok Sabha constituency) in 1952. He was Agrawal Vaishya.
