= Sanjeev Raja =

Indian politician

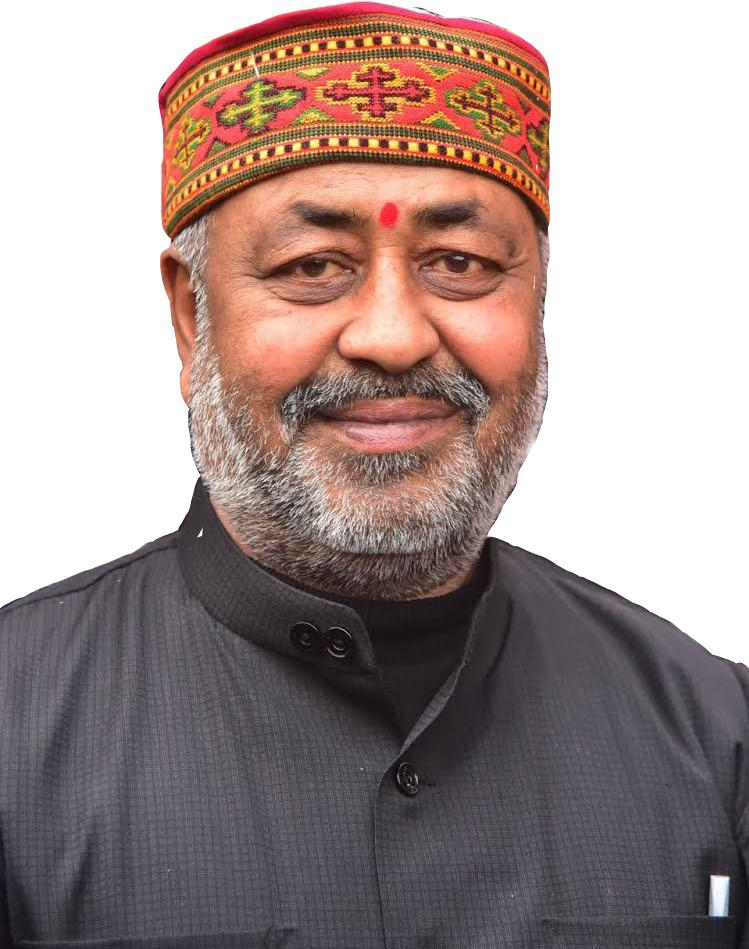
- Sanjeev Raja Bharatiya Janata Party Member Of Legislative Assembly
- Born: February 1, 1961; Wazirganj Badaun District
- Died: February 11, 2023 (aged 62); Malkhan Singh District Hospital
- Education: Post Graduate
- Occupation: Politician
- Political party: Bhartiya Janta Party

Sanjeev Raja (February 1, 1961 — February 11, 2023) was a formar politician from the Bharatiya Janata Party (BJP) in India. He served as a Member of the Uttar Pradesh Legislative Assembly representing the Aligarh constituency located in Aligarh district.

== Controversies ==
In April 2017, Raja garnered controversy when he and the Aligarh mayor, Shakuntala Bharti, called for a ban on cell phones for young girls in the region. This sparked public debate and criticism.

On November 19, 2021, Sanjeev Raja was sentenced to a two-year imprisonment and imposed a fine of Rs. 14,000 by a special judge for MLA & MP court for assaulting a policeman in 1999.

He is the first legislator to be convicted by the special court which was established in Aligarh district about two years ago. The court convicted Raja under various Indian Penal Code (IPC) sections, including rioting, voluntarily causing hurt to a public servant, assault or use of criminal force to a public servant, intentional insult and criminal intimidation. On November 17, 1999, when a constable stopped a truck loaded with sand and gravel and directed the driver not to enter the city. The driver, who claimed the truck was owned by Sanjeev Raja, entered the city anyway. The truck helper informed Raja, who along with several other unidentified individuals, arrived at the scene and assaulted the constable.

Sanjeev Raja was granted bail and was given 30 days to file an appeal against the order in the high court. He was not a legislator at the time of the incident in 1999.

== Early life ==
Sanjeev was born 1 February 1961 in Wazirganj,Budaun District. He was a Post Graduate. He was an alumnus of Varshney College, Aligarh.

Started politics as a student leader. It was a political journey of 40 years. He played a role in the Ram Janmabhoomi movement. He went to jail in the Rorawar incident. He became the city MLA for the first time by defeating the SP candidate in the 2017 assembly elections. Due to his conviction in the 1999 assault case, the BJP fielded his wife Mukta Raja in the 2022 election, which she won.

== Death ==
He died at the age of 62 on 11 February 2023 in Aligarh due to a heart attack and Brain Haemorrhage. Late on Friday, his health suddenly deteriorated at his residence at Yusufganj (Barhadwari). From here, he was taken to Malkhan Singh District Hospital Aligarh, where doctors declared him as dead.
