= Mahomed Hameed Ullah Khan =

Indian judge

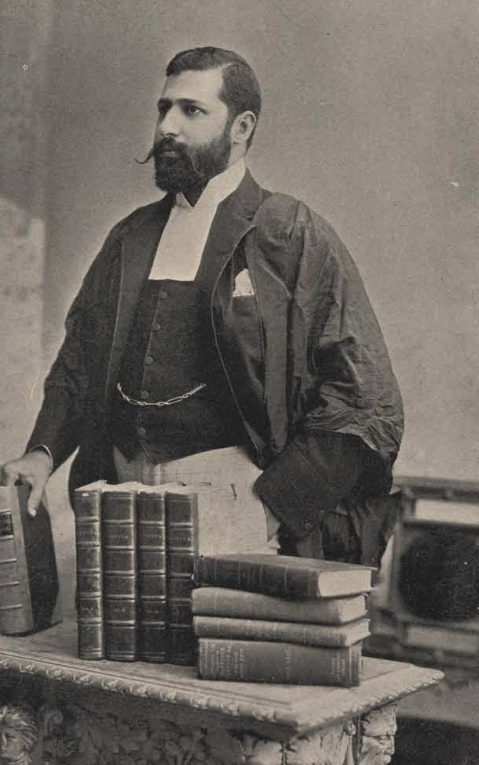

Chief Justice of Hyderabad State
- In office 1908 - ?
- Preceded by: Moulvi Mir Afzal Husain Sahib
- Succeeded by: Nawab Hakimuddowla Bahadur

Personal details
- Born: March 17, 1864 Agra
- Died: 1930
- Parent: Moulvi Samee Ullah Khan
- Relatives: Abdul Majeed Khwaja (son-in-law); Najeeb Jung (grandson)
- Education: Muhammadan Anglo Oriental College; Christ's College, Cambridge

Mahomed Hameed Ullah Khan (17 March 1864 – 1930), also known by his title Nawab Sarbuland Jung Bahadur, was an Indian judge.

== Early life and education ==
He was born at Agra on March 17, 1864. His father, Moulvi Mahomed Samee Ullah Khan was a prominent judge and educationist. His father established the Muhammadan Anglo Oriental College (predecessor of Aligarh Muslim University) in his bungalow at Aligarh, with half a dozen students, including Hameed. He was, famously, the first student enrolled into the college.

After completing his early education, he joined Wren and Gurney. In 1882, he joined Christ's College, Cambridge and Lincoln's Inn. He was called to the bar in 1886.

== Career ==
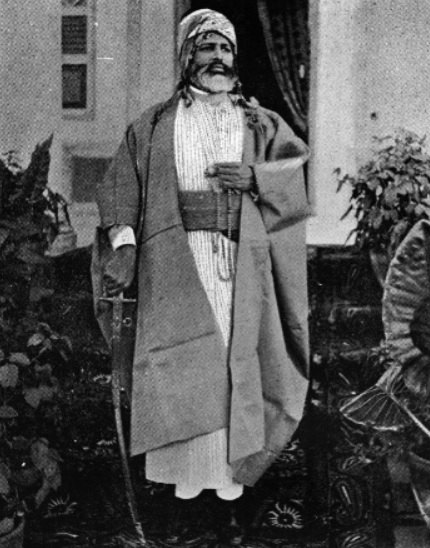
Nawab_Sarbuland_Jung,_Mahomed_Hameed_Ullah_Khan

In 1886, he enrolled as an advocate of the Allahabad High Court. While in Allahabad, he owned and edited The Allahabad Review, a bilingual magazine. He was also instrumental in setting up a hostel for Muslim students at the Muir Central College.

In 1895, he was appointed puisne judge of the Nizam's High Court and awarded the title of Afzulul-Ulema and Nawab Sarbuland Jung by the Nizam. He held this position until 1904, when he was appointed Home Secretary to the Cabinet and Legislative Council.

In 1908, he was appointed the Chief Justice of Hyderabad. He took an early retirement from judiciary in 1912.

== Personal life ==
He married to Akhtar-un-Nisa in 1894, who was also known as Begum Sarbuland Jung. The couple had 13 children, of which 10 survived.

His daughter was married to Abdul Majeed Khwaja. His grandson is Najeeb Jung. Another grandson is Jamal Khwaja.
