= Khwaja Muhammad Yusuf =

Indian lawyer

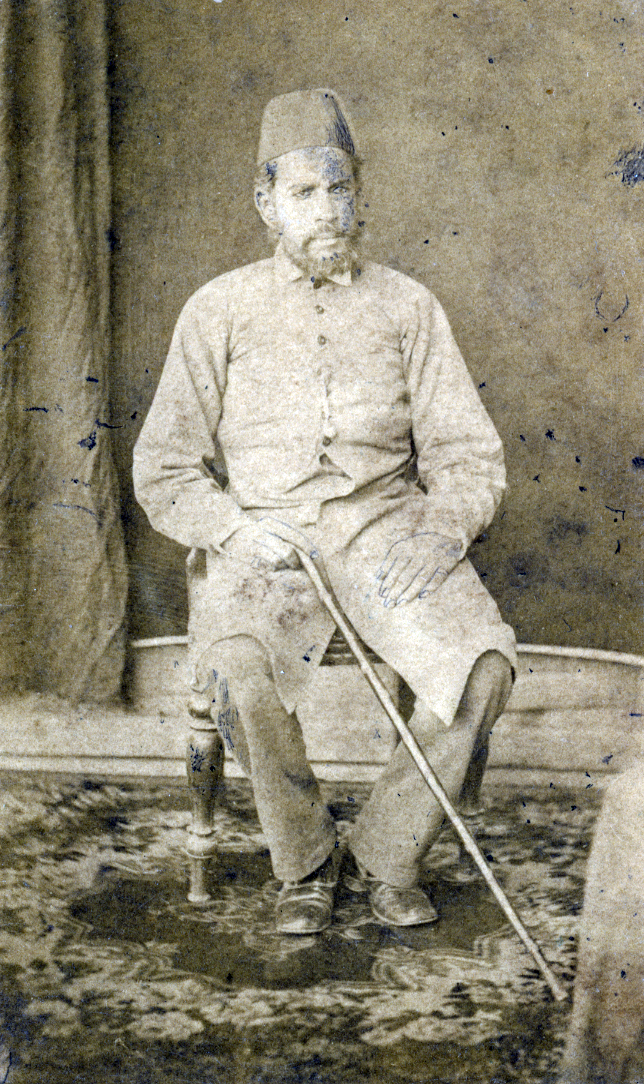

Khwaja Muhammad Yusuf (died 1902) was one of the top lawyers and landowners of Aligarh, a small but historically significant town in the ‘doab’ region of the state of Uttar Pradesh in northern India. He was among the first Indian Muslims to understand the nature and gravity of the issues posed by contemporary European colonialism. He was an Islamic liberal who believed that modern, Western-style education was essential for the survival of Indian Muslims in the contemporary world.

His elder son Yahya died as a young man, but Khwaja Yusuf made sure that his other son, Abdul Majeed Khwaja, got the best possible English education. Abdul Majeed went on to study at Christ's College, University of Cambridge, in England. There he forged a close friendship with, among others, Jawaharlal Nehru, the first Prime Minister of India.

Jawaharlal's father, Motilal Nehru, was a practicing lawyer at the Allahabad High Court and a prominent and early advocate for India's freedom from British colonial rule. Motilal Nehru and Khwaja Muhammad Yusuf had a close personal and professional relationship. Abdul Majeed Khwaja went on to play a significant role in India's struggle for freedom from British colonial rule. He was a close and trusted confidant of Mahatma Gandhi, India's founding father. Abdul Majeed was also a founding member of the Jamia Millia Islamia, which is now a full-fledged university. He died in 1962.

Khwaja Muhammad Yusuf was also very close to his relative and friend, Maulvi Samiullah Khan, a scion of the Muslim elite of Mughal Delhi. Maulvi Samiullah was an accomplished oriental scholar and later District and Sessions Judge in Rae Bareilly, also in Uttar Pradesh, India.

Both Khwaja Muhammad Yusuf and Maulvi Samiullah were early and influential supporters of Syed Ahmad Khan, the visionary founder of the Muhammadan Anglo-Oriental College, which eventually (1920) became the famous Aligarh Muslim University. Khwaja Muhammad Yusuf played an active role in the affairs of the Scientific Society formed by Syed Ahmad Khan to translate Western works into Urdu. Khwaja Yusuf was a major donor to the Muhammadan Anglo-Oriental College Fund Committee.

His nephew, Khwaja Abdul Hamied, an industrial chemist and ardent Indian freedom fighter, was the founder of CIPLA (1935), the pre-eminent fully indigenous pharmaceutical company of modern India.

Khwaja Muhammad Yusuf died in 1902 and was buried in the family graveyard adjacent to the shrine of the Sufi saint, Shah Jamal, on the outskirts of Aligarh.
