= Barauli, Uttar Pradesh Assembly constituency =

Constituency of the Uttar Pradesh legislative assembly in India

Barauli
- Constituency No. 72 for the Uttar Pradesh Legislative Assembly

Constituency details
- Country: India
- Region: North India
- State: Uttar Pradesh
- District: Aligarh
- Total electors: 307,350 (2012)
- Reservation: None

Member of Legislative Assembly
- 18th Uttar Pradesh Legislative Assembly
- Incumbent Thakur Jaiveer Singh
- Party: Bharatiya Janata Party
- Elected year: 2022

Barauli is one of the 403 constituencies of the Uttar Pradesh Legislative Assembly, India. It is a part of the Aligarh district and one of the five assembly constituencies in the Aligarh Lok Sabha constituency. First election in this assembly constituency was held in 1974 after the delimitation order was passed in 1967. After the "Delimitation of Parliamentary and Assembly Constituencies Order" was passed in 2008, the constituency was assigned identification number 72.

== Wards / Areas ==
Extent of Barauli Assembly constituency is KCs Barauli, Gabhana, PCs Kinhua, Darau Chandpur, Amritpur Bakhtpur & Bhojpur Gaiyanpur of Chandaus KC of Gabhana Tehsil; PCs Harduaganj, Ukhlana, Baraotha, Sapera Bhanpur, Talibnagar, Devsaini, Mahrawal, Ramgarh Panjupur, Godha, Jawan Sikanderpur, Baharampur, Maimri, Kanora, Chhalesar, Satha, Nagaula, Barheti, Rathgawan, Kastli Basya of Morthal KC, PCs Baranadi, Chhidawali, Azamabad Machhua, Kalai of Jalali KC, Harduaganj NP & Qasimpur (CT) of Koil Tehsil .

== Members of the Legislative Assembly ==
Term	Name	Party
06th Vidhan Sabha	Surendra Singh Chauhan	Indian National Congress
07th Vidhan Sabha	Surendra Singh Chauhan	Janata Party
08th Vidhan Sabha	Surendra Singh Chauhan	Indian National Congress
09th Vidhan Sabha	Surendra Singh Chauhan	Indian National Congress
10th Vidhan Sabha	Surendra Singh Chauhan	Indian National Congress
11th Vidhan Sabha	Dalveer Singh	Janata Dal
12th Vidhan Sabha	Muneesh Gaur	Bharatiya Janata Party
13th Vidhan Sabha	Dalveer Singh	Indian National Congress
14th Vidhan Sabha	Thakur Jaiveer Singh	Bahujan Samaj Party
15th Vidhan Sabha	Thakur Jaiveer Singh	Bahujan Samaj Party
16th Vidhan Sabha	Dalveer Singh	Rashtriya Lok Dal
17th Vidhan Sabha	Dalveer Singh	Bharatiya Janata Party
18th Vidhan Sabha	Thakur Jaiveer Singh	Bharatiya Janata Party

== Election results ==
=== 2027 ===
2027 Uttar Pradesh Legislative Assembly election: Barauli
Party	Candidate	Votes	%	±%
INDIA				
NDA				
BSP				
NOTA	None of the above			
Majority				
Turnout				
gain from		Swing		

=== 2022 ===
2022 Uttar Pradesh Legislative Assembly election: Barauli
Party	Candidate	Votes	%	±%
BJP	Thakur Jaiveer Singh	147,984	60.57	▲7.17
BSP	Narendra Sharma	57,339	23.47	▼13.44
RLD	Pramod Gaur	32,781	13.42	▲12.64
INC	Gaurang Devi	2,377	0.97	▼6.36
NOTA	None of the above	1,092	0.45	▼0.12
Majority		90,645	37.1	▲20.61
Turnout		244,299	64.28	▼1.62
BJP hold		Swing		

=== 2017 ===
2017 Uttar Pradesh Legislative Assembly Election: Barauli
Party	Candidate	Votes	%	±%
BJP	Dalveer Singh	125,545	53.4	
BSP	Thakur Jaiveer Singh	86,782	36.91	
INC	Keshav Singh	17,238	7.33	
NOTA	None of the above	1,338	0.57	
Majority		38,763	16.49	
Turnout		235,107	65.9	

=== 2012 ===
2012 General Elections: Barauli
Party	Candidate	Votes	%	±%
RLD	Dalveer Singh	80,440	39.43	–
BSP	Thakur Jaiveer Singh	68,417	33.54	–
Independent	Keshav Singh	30,540	14.97	–
	Remainder 18 candidates	24,606	12.06	–
Majority		12,023	5.89	–
Turnout		204,003	66.37	–
RLD gain from BSP		Swing		

== See also ==
- Aligarh Lok Sabha constituency
- Aligarh district
- Sixteenth Legislative Assembly of Uttar Pradesh
- Uttar Pradesh Legislative Assembly
