= Khwaja Abdul Hamied =

Indian businessman

- Born: 31 October 1898; Aligarh, North-Western Provinces, British India (now in Uttar Pradesh, India)
- Died: 23 June 1972 (aged 73); Tehran, Iran
- Education: Muir Central College; University of Allahabad; Friedrich Wilhelm University (now Humboldt University of Berlin)
- Known for: Founder of Cipla
- Scientific career
- Fields: Industrial chemistry; Pharmaceutical chemistry

Khwaja Abdul Hamied FCS, FRIC (31 October 1898 – 23 June 1972) was an Indian industrial and pharmaceutical chemist who founded Cipla, India's oldest pharmaceutical company in 1935. His son, Yusuf Hamied headed the company after him for the next 52 years.

Khwaja Abdul Hamied was active in the Indian independence movement and a champion of composite nationalism.

== Early life and background ==
Hamied was born in Aligarh, to Khwaja Abdul Ali, an advocate, and Masood Jahan Begum. Through his father, he was descended from the Sufi saint Khwaja Ahrar of Iran (Uzbekistan), while on his mother's side, he was descended from Shah Shuja, the last Durrani king of Afghanistan. His paternal great-uncle was the noted reformer Sayyid Ahmad Khan he was also the grandnephew of Khwaja Muhammad Yusuf and a nephew to Abdul Majeed Khwaja

== Education ==
After matriculating from Islamia High School, Etawah, distinguishing himself in mathematics, Hamied completed his Intermediate in Science from Agra College in 1917. Having decided to become a chemist, he then spent a year at a Madras trade school studying leather technology before enrolling at Muir Central College in Allahabad, from which he completed his B.Sc. in chemistry in 1920. While at the college, he became a favourite student of Nil Ratan Dhar, a distinguished inorganic chemist under whom he studied for a master's degree.

Hamied graduated from Allahabad University in Allahabad, Uttar Pradesh and held M.A. and PhD degrees from the Humboldt University of Berlin in Germany. After a meeting with Mahatma Gandhi in the early 1920s, Hamied co-founded Jamia Millia Islamia in New Delhi with Zakir Husain.

== Career ==
Hamied's family raised money to send him to study chemistry in England, during British rule, in 1924. Instead, he changed ships and went to Germany, then the world's leader in chemicals. On a Berlin lake, he met a Lithuanian Jewish socialist, whom he married. They fled as the Nazis rose to power in Germany.

Chemical, Industrial and Pharmaceutical Laboratories, Cipla was founded in 1935 with an initial capital of Rs. 2 lakhs. The company commenced production in 1937 making it the oldest pharmaceutical company in India. His eldest son Yusuf Hamied, who did study chemistry in England, is now Chairman of Cipla. Yusuf still refers to his chemistry notebooks from Cambridge.

Apart from conceiving the idea of establishing a National Chemical Laboratory and making it a reality, Dr Khwaja Hamied floated the idea and conceptualized the establishment of the Council of Scientific and Industrial Research (CSIR) as an umbrella organization to run a clutch of laboratories. He remained a Member of the Governing Body of the CSIR right from its inception till the very last

During the last four decades of his life, he played an important role in raising the pharmaceutical and chemical industry standards in India to an extraordinarily high level through founding the firm Cipla.

Dr. Hamied was an honorary professor and a member of the executive council of the Aligarh Muslim University, member of the Senate of Bombay University and a fellow of the Royal Institute of Chemistry, UK. He was also a member of the Bombay Legislative Council from 1937 to 1962, refusing the offer of becoming a Muslim Minister in the cabinet in Bombay. Hamied also served as Sheriff of Bombay.

Dr Khwaja Abdul Hamied died in 1972 after a brief illness.

== Indian independence movement ==
Khwaja Abdul Hamied was influenced by his uncle Abdul Majeed Khwaja, who "was a close associate of C. R. Das, M. A. Ansari, Mahatma Gandhi, and T. A. K. Sherwani during the freedom struggle and had served in jail for fighting the British Colonial rule in India."

Hamied followed Mahatma Gandhi's Indian nationalism and denounced communal politics advocated by the All India Muslim League (AIML). In 1937, he ran in Legislative Council Elections against an AIML politician in the constituency of Muhammad Ali Jinnah, who subsequently disparaged him, stating “Young man, why are you contesting the election? No one knows you in Bombay and who is going to vote for you. It is better that you withdraw.” Backed by Zakir Husain, Khwaja Abdul Hamied was victorious in the election. He stated: “As I had opposed the Muslim League candidate and won the election, everyone called me a great Nationalist Muslim. I said that I was an Indian and there was no question of being a Nationalist, an Indian was an Indian and belonged to the Nation….. Every Indian belongs to India and is, therefore, a Nationalist.” Khwaja Abdul Hamied felt that Muhammad Ali Jinnah's views "represented a minority view among Indian Muslims".

Khwaja Abdul Hamied was against the idea of separate electorates based on the religious faith of an individual, declaring that they were an evil manifestation of divisive communalism. He was a major opponent of the partition of India. In fact, when the partition of India was accepted by the British, he recommended "an armed struggle against the Muslim League to keep India united":

If the Congress would have prepared their plan, which they never did, and submitted it to the British Cabinet irrespective of the fact whether Mr. Jinnah or the Muslim League agrees to it or not, we could have forced the issue on the British Cabinet to accept that plan leaving it to ourselves to see whether the Muslim League agrees to it or not. If they do not, then the only alternative is a civil war. We should not be afraid of such a situation. History proves that this kind of civil war, at the time when power is given to the people of a country, is inevitable.

In a meeting with Sardar Vallabhbhai Patel, Khwaja Abdul Hamied stated that the partition of India should not occur in the absence of a plebiscite, holding that "if people were told that those who vote for Pakistan had to go to that country then nobody would vote for the partition."
