= Dalbir Singh Chaudhary =

Indian politician

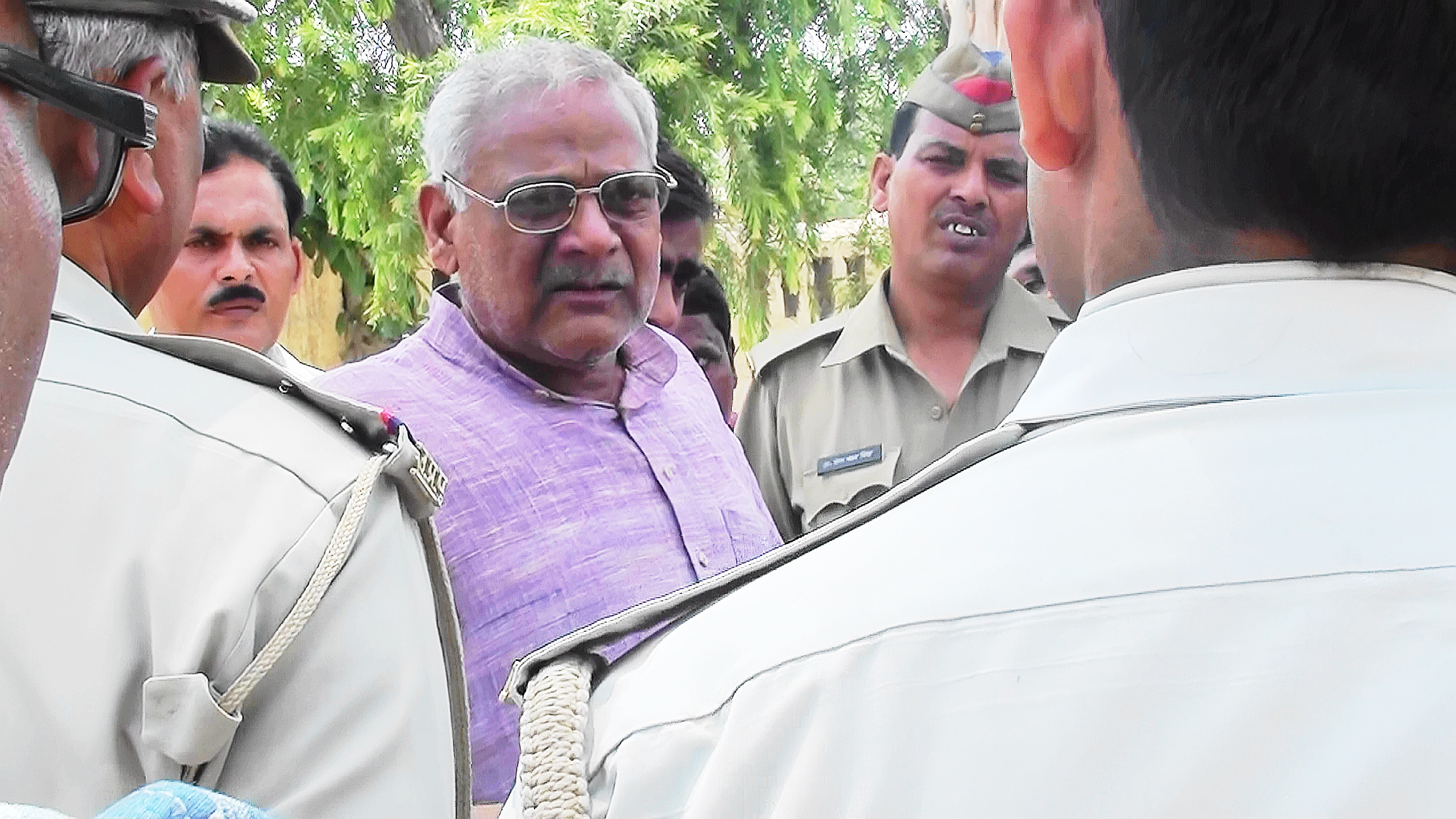
Image of Thakur Dalveer Singh during a visit to Jawan Sikandarpur's Thana (Police Station) about a case.

Thakur Dalveer Singh is an Indian politician and member of the Bharatiya Janata Party. He is a former member of the Uttar Pradesh Legislative Assembly from the Barauli constituency in Aligarh district.
