= Raj Kumari Chauhan =

Indian politician

Member of Parliament, Lok Sabha
- In office 2009–2014
- Preceded by: Bijendra Singh
- Succeeded by: Satish Kumar Gautam
- Constituency: Aligarh (Uttar Pradesh)

Personal details
- Born: 15 January 1969 (age 57) Chherat, Aligarh, Uttar Pradesh, India
- Party: Bahujan Samaj Party (BSP)
- Spouse: Thakur Jaivir Singh
- Children: 4 sons
- Occupation: Politician

Raj Kumari Chauhan was a member of the 15th Lok Sabha of India. She represented the Aligarh constituency of Uttar Pradesh and is a member of the Bahujan Samaj Party (BSP) political party.

== Posts Held ==
#	From	To	Position
01	2009	Date	Elected to 15th Lok Sabha
02	2009	Date	Member, Committee on Railways

== See also ==
- List of members of the 15th Lok Sabha of India
