= Mohan Lal Gautam =

Indian independence activist and politician (1902–1977)

Member of Parliament, Rajya Sabha
- In office 1969–1972
- Constituency: Uttar Pradesh

Member of the Constituent Assembly
- In office 1946–1950

Personal details
- Born: 1902 Aligarh, Uttar Pradesh
- Died: 4 August 1977
- Party: Indian National Congress
- Children: Sheela Gautam
- Occupation: Independence activist, politician

Mohan Lal Gautam (1902–1977) was an Indian independence activist and politician who served as a member of the Constituent Assembly of India. A joint secretary of the Congress Socialist Party (1934) and later General Secretary of the All India Congress Committee (AICC), Gautam participated in the anti-colonial freedom struggles such as the Non-Cooperation and Quit India movements. After independence, he served in the Uttar Pradesh cabinet as Minister for Local Self-Government (1952–1954) under Govind Ballabh Pant, and later as Minister for Cooperation and Agriculture under Sampurnanand. He also served as a Member of Parliament in the Rajya Sabha representing Uttar Pradesh from 1969 to 1972.

== Career ==
Gautam was born in 1902 in the Aligarh district of Uttar Pradesh. He was active in the Indian Independence movement. In 1934, he was a founding member of the Congress Socialist Party (CSP) and served as the joint secretary of CSP. CSP was founded within the Indian National Congress. In 1950, when Purushottam Tandon was serving as the president of Congress Party, Gautam was appointed as the General Secretary of the party. According to political scientist Paul Brass, Gautam was Tandon's main political organiser. Under his tenure as general secretary, Gautam helped to distribute Congress tickets for the 1952 General Elections. In 1962 general election, he contested from the Khair constituency in Aligarh but was defeated.

He died on 4th August 1977.

== Personal life ==
Gautam was born in a Brahmin family. His daughter, Sheela Gautam, was a four-time Member of Parliament (MP) from Aligarh constituency and the founder of Sheela Foam Limited (Sleepwell).
