= Koil Assembly constituency =

Constituency of the Uttar Pradesh legislative assembly in India

Koil
- Constituency No. 75 for the Uttar Pradesh Legislative Assembly

Constituency details
- Country: India
- Region: North India
- State: Uttar Pradesh
- District: Aligarh
- Lok Sabha constituency: Aligarh
- Total electors: 293,029 (2012)
- Reservation: None

Member of Legislative Assembly
- 18th Uttar Pradesh Legislative Assembly
- Incumbent Anil Parashar
- Party: Bharatiya Janata Party
- Elected year: 2022

Koil is one of the 403 constituencies of the Uttar Pradesh Legislative Assembly, India. It is a part of the Aligarh district and is one of the five assembly constituencies in the Aligarh Lok Sabha constituency. The first election in this assembly constituency was held in 1952 after the "DPACO (1951)" (delimitation order) was passed in 1951. After the "Delimitation of Parliamentary and Assembly Constituencies Order" was passed in 2008, the constituency was assigned identification number 75.

== Wards / Areas ==
Extent of Koil Assembly constituency is KC Koil, PC Bhamola Mafi of Morthal KC & Ward Nos. 7, 22, 28, 30 to 34, 36, 40 to 44, 47, 48, 49, 51, 52, 53 & 57 in Aligarh (M Corp.) of Koil Tehsil.

== Members of the Legislative Assembly ==
Year	Con. No.	Con. Na.	Res.	Member	Party	Ref.
1952	84	Khair cum Koil North West	None	Ram Prasad Deshmukh	Indian National Congress	
1952	84	Khair cum Koil North West	None	Mohan Lal Gautam	Indian National Congress	
1952	85	Koil Central	None	Nafisul Hasan	Indian National Congress	
1952	87	Atrauli South cum Koil East	None	Raja Ram	Indian National Congress	
1952	88	Sikandra Rao North cum Koil South East	None	Natrapal Singh	Indian National Congress	

Year	Con. No.	Res.	Member	Party	Ref.
1957	97	SC	Mohan Lal Gautam	Indian National Congress	
1957	97	SC	Ram Prasad Deshmukh	Indian National Congress	
1962	382	SC	Bhoop Singh	Republican Party of India	
1967	377	SC	K. L. Diler	Bharatiya Jan Sangh	
1969	377	SC	Pooran Chand	Bharatiya Kranti Dal	
1974	374	SC	Pooran Chand	Indian National Congress	
1977	374	SC	Kishan Lal Diler	Janata Party	
1980	374	SC	Pooran Chand	Indian National Congress (I)	
1985	374	SC	Kishan Lal Diler	Bharatiya Janata Party	
1989	374	SC	Ram Prasad Deshmukh	Indian National Congress	
1991	374	SC	Kishan Lal Diler	Bharatiya Janata Party	
1993	374	SC	Kishan Lal Diler	Bharatiya Janata Party	
1996	374	SC	Ram Sakhi	Bharatiya Janata Party	
2002	358	SC	Mahender Singh	Bahujan Samaj Party	
2007	358	SC	Mahender Singh	Bahujan Samaj Party	
2012	75	None	Zameer Ullah Khan	Samajwadi Party	
2017	75	None	Anil Parashar	Bharatiya Janata Party	
2022	75	None	Anil Parashar	Bharatiya Janata Party	

== Election results ==
=== 2027 ===
2027 Uttar Pradesh Legislative Assembly election: Koil
Party	Candidate	Votes	%	±%
INDIA				
NDA				
BSP				
NOTA	None of the above			
Majority				
Turnout				
gain from		Swing		

=== 2022 ===
2022 Uttar Pradesh Legislative Assembly election: Koil
Party	Candidate	Votes	%	±%
BJP	Anil Parashar	108,067	42.81	▲1.77
SP	Shaz Ishaq	103,039	40.82	▲22.07
BSP	Mohammad Bilal	23,016	9.12	▼7.46
INC	Vivek Bansal	15,550	6.16	▼10.74
NOTA	None of the above	1,144	0.45	▼0.25
Majority		5,028	1.99	▼20.3
Turnout		252,406	62.34	▼0.62
BJP hold		Swing		

=== 2017 ===
2017 Uttar Pradesh Legislative Assembly election: Koil
Party	Candidate	Votes	%	±%
BJP	Anil Parashar	93,814	41.04	
SP	Shaz Ishaq	42,851	18.75	
INC	Vivek Bansal	38,623	16.90	
BSP	Ram Kumar Sharma	37,909	16.58	
Independent	Zameer Ullah Khan	10,912	4.77	
NOTA	None of the above	1,580	0.70	
Majority		50,963	22.29	
Turnout		228,587	62.96	
BJP gain from SP		Swing	▲21.86	

=== 2012 ===
2012 Uttar Pradesh Legislative Assembly election: Koil
Party	Candidate	Votes	%	±%
SP	Zameer Ullah Khan	44,847	25.42	−
INC	Vivek Bansal	44,248	25.08	−
BJP	Yogendra Pal Singh	34,741	19.69	−
	Remainder 23 candidates	52,579	29.8	−
Majority		599	0.34	−
Turnout		176,415	60.2	−
SP gain from BSP		Swing		

== See also ==
- Aligarh district
- Aligarh Lok Sabha constituency
- Uttar Pradesh Legislative Assembly
