= Religious Protection Bill =

Proposed law of India

The second generation of religious protection of freedom to practice bills in India, proposed by member of parliament Prakash Vir Shastri in 1960. The bill was eventually revoked due to lack of support. The bill had a predecessor, the Indian Conversion Regulation and Registration Bill of 1954. These bills paved the way for the Orissa Freedom of Religions Act of 1967.
