= Zameer Ullah Khan =

Indian politician

MLA
- In office March 2012 – March 2017
- Preceded by: Mahendra Singh
- Succeeded by: Anil Parashar
- Constituency: Koil (Assembly constituency)
- In office May 2007 – March 2012
- Preceded by: Vivek Bansal
- Succeeded by: Zafar Alam
- Constituency: Aligarh (Assembly constituency)

Personal details
- Born: 20 June 1966 (age 60) Aligarh district, India
- Party: Samajwadi Party
- Spouse: Tabbasum
- Children: 3
- Education: None
- Profession: Politician

Zameer Ullah Khan is an Indian politician and a member of the 15th and 16th Legislative Assembly of India. He represents the Koil constituency of Uttar Pradesh and is a member of the Samajwadi Party.

== Early life and education ==
Zameer Ullah Khan was born in Aligarh district. He is educated till eighth grade.

== Political career ==
Zameer Ullah Khan has been a MLA for two terms. He represented the Koil constituency and is a member of the Samajwadi Party political party.

== Posts held ==
#	From	To	Position	Comments
01	March 2012	March 2017	Member, 16th Legislative Assembly	
02	May 2007	March 2012	Member, 15th Legislative Assembly	

== See also ==
- Aligarh (Assembly constituency)
- Koil (Assembly constituency)
- Sixteenth Legislative Assembly of Uttar Pradesh
- Uttar Pradesh Legislative Assembly
