= Prakash Vir Shastri =

Indian politician and Social reformer

Member of Parliament in Lok Sabha and Rajya Sabha
- In office 1958–1977

Personal details
- Born: 30 December 1923 Rehra, Uttar Pradesh
- Died: 23 November 1977 (aged 53) Uttar Pradesh
- Party: Independent

Prakash Vir Shastri (30 December 1923 – 23 November 1977) was a Member of the Parliament of India (Sansad) and was also a leader in the Arya Samaj movement.

== Career ==
Shastri was born to Dalipsingh Tyagi on 30 December 1923 in the Rehra village of Moradabad district (now in the Amroha district) of Uttar Pradesh. He was politically active as a young man, obtaining an M.A. degree from Agra University, and eventually rising to become Vice-Chancellor of Gurukul Vrindavan. He earned his Shastri degree from Sampurnanand Sanskrit University. In 1958 Shastri was elected to the Lok Sabha as an Independent and until his death continued to serve as an Independent member, first in the Lok Sabha and later in the Rajya Sabha. He was elected as a Jana Sangh nominee in 1974.

== Oratory style ==
Shastri opposed the official designation of English as the national language of India. He instead preferred Hindi.

== Religious activism ==
Shastri was also internationally recognised as a devotee of the Arya Samaj movement, a branch of Hinduism dedicated to the Vedas.

Shastri proposed the Religious Protection Bill in March 1960 in the Lok Sabha, which called for the protection of religious minorities in the face of mass conversions by force occurring across the country at the time.

== Train accident ==
Shastri was killed in a train accident on 23 November 1977. He was survived by his wife and two children.

== Speech compilations ==
In early 2003, a collection of his parliamentary speeches was compiled for publication, in part by former Deputy Prime Minister Lal Krishna Advani.
