= Bana Malwala =

Village in Kapurthala, Punjab, India

- Village
- Location in Punjab, India Bana Malwala (India)
- Coordinates: 31.468312°N 75.265406°E
- Country: India
- State: Punjab
- District: Kapurthala

Government
  - Type: Panchayati raj (India)
  - Body: Gram panchayat

Population (2011)
  - Total: 111
- Sex ratio 51/60♂/♀

Languages
  - Official: Punjabi
  - Other spoken: Hindi
- Time zone: UTC+5:30 (IST)
- PIN: 144804
- Telephone code: 01822
- ISO 3166 code: IN-PB
- Vehicle registration: PB-09
- Website: kapurthala.gov.in

Bana Malwala is a village in Kapurthala district of Punjab State, India. It is located 16 kilometres (9.9 mi) from Kapurthala, which is both district and sub-district headquarters of Bana Malwala. The village is administrated by a Sarpanch, who is an elected representative. Bana Malwala is named after Dewan Bana Mal Gautam who hailed from Gautam (Shori ) Brahmin family of Nawanshahr, Bana Mal was owner of this village he was Manager of Maharja Randhir Singh Ahluwalia of Kapurthala 's Estate in Oudh (UP) in 1862 A.D and Chief minister of Kapurthala Princely State, Banna Mal built Shivala Mandir known as Banna Mal Shivala in Nawanshahr and also owns Brahampur, Phagwara Village in Phagwara Tehsil.

== Demography ==
According to the report published by Census India in 2011, Bana Malwala has a total number of 19 houses and population of 111 of which include 51 males and 60 females. Literacy rate of Bana Malwala is 54.74%, lower than state average of 75.84%. The population of children under the age of 6 years is 16 which is 14.41% of total population of Bana Malwala, and child sex ratio is approximately 1000 higher than state average of 846.

== Population data ==
Particulars	Total	Male	Female
Total No. of Houses	19	-	-
Population	111	51	60
Child (0-6)	16	8	8
Schedule Caste	111	51	60
Schedule Tribe	0	0	0
Literacy	54.74 %	46.51 %	61.54 %
Total Workers	41	28	13
Main Worker	35	0	0
Marginal Worker	6	0	6

== Air travel connectivity ==
The closest airport to the village is Sri Guru Ram Dass Jee International Airport.
