= Captain Raja Virendra Shah =

Indian politician

Captain Raja Virendra Shah Judeo

MLA
- In office 1952–1957
- Constituency: Kalpi (Uttar Pradesh)

MLA
- In office 1957–1962
- Succeeded by: Shiv Sampati Sharma
- Constituency: Kalpi (Uttar Pradesh)

MLC (UttarPradesh Vidhan Parisad)
- In office 1962–1967
- In office 1968–1971

General Secretary (Akhil Bhartiya kshatriya Mahasabha)
- In office 1940-1943

Uttar Pradesh President (Hindu Mahasabha)
- In office 1944

Personal details
- Born: 25 July 1915 Jagamanpur State, Jalaun Uttar Pradesh, India
- Died: 1971 (aged 55–56) Jagammanpur Jalaun Uttar Pradesh, India
- Parent(s): Second Lieutenant Raja Lokendra Shah (father); Ranisab Vaisani Raje (mother)
- Profession: Raja of jagamanpur, farmer

Captain Raja Virendra Shah Judeo Bahadur (1915-1971) was an Indian politician. A member of the Uttar Pradesh Praja Party, he was elected to the First and Secer was Raja Lokendra Shah of Jagamanpur.
