= Sheela Gautam =

Indian politician and businesswoman (1931–2019)

Member of Parliament, Lok Sabha
- In office June 1991 – May 2004
- Preceded by: Usha Rani Tomar
- Succeeded by: Bijendra Singh
- Constituency: Aligarh

Personal details
- Born: 15 November 1931 Aligarh, United Provinces, British India
- Died: 8 June 2019 (aged 87) New Delhi, India
- Citizenship: Indian
- Party: Bharatiya Janata Party
- Spouse: Late Lt. Col. H.S. Gautam
- Children: One son & one daughter
- Education: Lucknow University
- Occupation: Politician, Businessperson
- Website: sleepwellproducts.com mysleepwell.com

Sheela Gautam (15 November 1931 – 8 June 2019) was an Indian billionaire politician and businesswoman. She was the founder and owner of Sheela Foam Limited, run by her son Rahul Gautam, which sells mattresses under the Sleepwell brand among others. A member of the Bharatiya Janta Party she served in the 10th, 11th, 12th & 13th Lok Sabhas of India. She represented the Aligarh Lok Sabha constituency of Uttar Pradesh for 13 years in row from June 1991 to May 2004. She was the daughter of Mohan Lal Gautam, a freedom fighter and Congress politician.

== Early life and education ==
Sheela Gautam was born in a Brahmin family at gabhana Aligarh district. Her parents were Indian freedom activist Pt. Mohan Lal Gautam and Smt. Draupadi Gautam. At that time, the British Raj occupied India so she spent her life in several places. She got a B.A., B.Ed., and diploma in management from Lucknow University, Lucknow (Uttar Pradesh).

== Marriage ==
She married Lt. Col. H.S. Gautam who died of cancer.

== Political career ==
She joined politics with the Indian National Congress but resigned and joined the Bharatiya Janata Party. She held the post of MP continuously from 1991 through 2004 as a member of the 10th, 11th, 12th & 13th Lok Sabha. She is the record longest-serving Lok Sabha MP from Aligarh Lok Sabha constituency. In May 2004 elections she lost to Indian National Congress candidate Bijendra Singh by a margin of 2800 votes.
