= Ganeshi Lal =

Indian politician

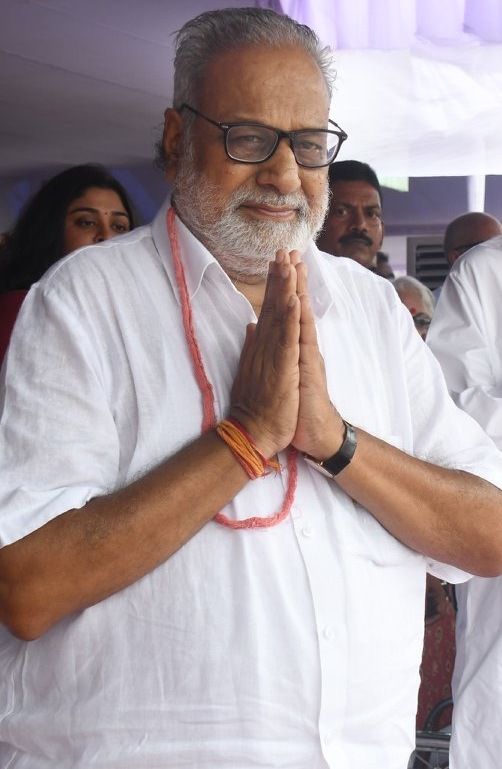
- Lal in 2018

26th Governor of Odisha
- In office 29 May 2018 – 30 October 2023
- Chief Minister: Naveen Patnaik
- Preceded by: Satya Pal Malik (Additional charge)
- Succeeded by: Raghubar Das

Member of the Legislative Assembly
- In office 1996-2000
- Constituency: Sirsa, Haryana

Personal details
- Born: 1 March 1941 (age 85) Sirsa, Punjab, British India (present-day Haryana, India)
- Party: Bharatiya Janata Party
- Spouse: Susheela Devi (m. 2020, died)

Ganeshi Lal (born 1 March 1941) is an Indian politician who served as the 25th Governor of Odisha.

== Early life and career ==
Ganeshi Lal was born in Sirsa, Haryana on 1 March 1941. He received a university degree in English and a post-graduate degree in mathematics. Subsequently, he worked as a professor in different Government colleges in Haryana between 1964 and 1991.

From 2003 to 2006 he served as the President of the Bharatiya Janata Party, Haryana unit.

He has authored a book on Bhagavad Gita titled Non-attached Attachment.

== Personal life ==
Lal married Sushila Devi, who died on 23 November 2020 due to COVID-19. They have seven children.

Political offices
Preceded by Satya Pal Malik (Additional Charge)	Governor of Odisha; 29 May 2018 - 30 October 2023	Succeeded by Raghubar Das
