= Bijendra Singh =

Indian politician

Member of Parliament, Lok Sabha
- In office May 2004 – May 2009
- Preceded by: Sheela Gautam
- Succeeded by: Raj Kumari Chauhan
- Constituency: Aligarh

Personal details
- Born: 25 December 1956 (age 69) Aligarh, Uttar Pradesh, India
- Party: Samajwadi Party
- Other political affiliations: Indian National Congress
- Spouse: Rakesh Chaudhary
- Children: 2 daughters
- As of 22 September, 2006

Chaudhary Bijendra Singh (born 25 December 1956) is an Indian politician. He stood for the 2004 Lok Sabha elections on the Indian National Congress ticket and became a Member of Parliament from Aligarh. He is the resident of village Dhonda near Iglas Tehsil. He had also been five times MLA from Iglas, Aligarh. He is standing again for the Samajwadi Party in the 2024 Lok Sabha elections.
