= Jawan Vajidpur =

Jawan Vajidpur Chhota Jawan
- Village
- Nickname: motto =
- Jawan Vajidpur has shown within the map of Uttar Pradesh Jawan Vajidpur (India)
- Coordinates: 27.176049°N 79.42012°E
- Country: India
- State: Uttar Pradesh
- District: Aligarh

Jawan Vajidpur is a village of block & nagar panchayat Jawan Sikandarpur, Aligarh district in Northern India. It also known as Chhota Jawan.
