= Moulvi Samee Ullah Khan =

Moulvi Mahomed Samee Ullah Khan CMG
- Born: 1834; Delhi
- Died: 7 April 1908 (aged 73); Aligarh
- Children: 2, including Mahomed Hameed Ullah Khan

Moulvi Mahomed Samee Ullah Khan was an Indian judge and educationist. A prominent figure in the Aligarh movement, he was one of the founders of the Mohammedan Anglo Oriental College and a close associate of Syed Ahmad Khan.

== Early life ==
He was born in 1834. His father was Mahomed Azizulla Khan, assistant to David Ochterlony.

== Career ==
In 1873, he was appointed a subordinate judge. In 1884, he was appointed on the staff of Lord Northbrook and sent to Egypt. In 1892, he retired from government service and settled at Aligarh.

== Role in Aligarh movement ==
In 1875, the Madrasatul Uloom Musalmanan-e-Hind was founded with half a dozen students, in his bungalow at Aligarh. This school was renamed Mohammedan Anglo Oriental College two years later. He presided over the first session of All India Muhammadan Educational Conference.

== Later life and death ==
In 1904, he performed the Hajj. The Moulvi died on 7 April 1908, at Aligarh after a brief illness. He was buried in Delhi.

== Personal life ==
He had two sons. His eldest son, Mahomed Hameed Ullah Khan served as the Chief Justice of Hyderabad State. His younger son, Majid-ullah Khan, served on the council of Bhopal State.
