= Cipla =

Indian multinational pharmaceutical company

Cipla Limited
- Trade name: Cipla
- Formerly: Chemical Industrial & Pharmaceutical Laboratories Ltd. (1935–1984)
- Type: Public
- Traded as: BSE: 500087; NSE: CIPLA; NSE NIFTY 50 constituent
- ISIN: INE059A01026
- Industry: Pharmaceuticals
- Founded: 1935 (91 years ago)
- Founder: Khwaja Abdul Hamied
- Headquarters: Mumbai, Maharashtra, India
- Area served: Worldwide
- Key people: Y. K. Hamied (Chairperson); Umang Vohra (CEO)
- Products: Pharmaceutical drugs; generic drugs; antiviral drugs; over-the-counter drugs; vaccines; diagnostics; contact lenses; animal health; dietary supplements; protein supplements
- Revenue: ▲₹27,548 crore (US$2.9 billion) (2025)
- Operating income: ▲₹7,128 crore (US$740 million) (2025)
- Net income: ▲₹5,273 crore (US$550 million) (2025)
- Total assets: ▲₹37,387 crore (US$3.9 billion) (2025)
- Total equity: ▲₹31,289 crore (US$3.2 billion) (2025)
- Number of employees: 27,764 (March 2024)
- Subsidiaries: Invagen Pharmaceuticals
- Website: www.cipla.com
- Footnotes; Financials as of 31 March 2025.

Cipla Limited is an Indian multinational pharmaceutical company headquartered in Mumbai. Cipla primarily focuses on developing medication to treat respiratory disease, cardiovascular disease, arthritis, diabetes, depression, paediatric and various other medical conditions. Cipla has 47 manufacturing locations across the world and sells its products in 86 countries. It is the third-largest drug producer in India.

== History ==
After meeting Mahatma Gandhi in the early 1920s, Khwaja Abdul Hamied decided to contribute to the Swadeshi movement by pursuing a doctorate in chemistry. In 1935, Hamied founded Cipla as the Chemical, Industrial & Pharmaceutical Laboratories in Mumbai. During World War II, the company became the largest supplier of quinine and Vitamin B12 for Allied soldiers. The company name shortened to its current form in July 1984. Upon Hamied's death in 1972, his son Yusuf Hamied, a Cambridge-educated chemist, took over the company.

In 1995, Cipla launched Deferiprone, the world's first oral iron chelator. In 1999, Cipla joined the Indian Pharmaceutical Alliance as a founding member in an effort to promote the development of generic drugs in India. During the AIDS epidemic in the early 2000s, Hamied reverse-engineered a three-drug antiretroviral medication that was sold for about $12,000 per year to create a cheaper version that sold for $304 per year. This drug was sold to African charities and governments. It is estimated that "at one time, as much as 40 percent of the AIDS patients in poor countries took Cipla drugs".

During the avian flu pandemic in 2006, Cipla was able to reverse-engineer the drug Tamiflu and sell it for significantly lower prices. In 2013, Cipla acquired the South African company Cipla-Medpro. Its name was changed to Cipla Medpro South Africa Limited and was kept as a subsidiary. At the time of the acquisition, Cipla-Medpro had been a distribution partner for Cipla and was South Africa's third-biggest pharmaceutical company. The company had been founded in 2002 under the name Enaleni Pharmaceuticals Ltd. In 2005, Enaleni bought all the shares of Cipla-Medpro, which had been a joint venture between Cipla and Medpro Pharmaceuticals, a South African generics company; in 2008, it changed its name to Cipla-Medpro. In September 2023, it was announced Cipla South Africa had acquired the Midrand-headquartered healthcare products manufacturer, Actor Pharma.

In September 2015, Cipla acquired InvaGen Pharmaceuticals and Exelan Pharmaceuticals, two American pharmaceutical companies, for 555 million dollars. In 2019, Cipla entered digital therapeutics by partnering with Wellthy Therapeutics in India and Brandmed in South Africa. In April 2024, Cipla acquired Ivia Beaute Pvt Ltd's cosmetics and personal care distribution and marketing business for ₹130 crore.

== Products and services ==
Cipla sells active pharmaceutical ingredients to other manufacturers as well as pharmaceutical and personal care products, including the anti-depressant escitalopram oxalate, lamivudine, and fluticasone propionate. Cipla is the world's largest manufacturer of antiretroviral drugs.

In July 2020, the company announced the introduction of Gilead Sciences' Remdesivir under the brand name CIPREMI in India after reaching a voluntary licensing agreement with the parent company and DCGI approval for "restricted emergency use" in COVID-19 treatment of patients in critical condition.

== Operations ==
Cipla has 34 manufacturing units in 8 locations across India and a presence in over 80 countries. Exports accounted for 48% ₹4,948 crore (equivalent to ₹92 billion or US$950 million in 2026) of its revenue for the 2013–14 fiscal year. Cipla spent ₹517 crore (5.4% of their revenue) in the 2013–14 fiscal year on R&D activities. The primary focus areas for R&D were development of new formulations, drug-delivery systems, and APIs. Cipla also cooperates with other enterprises in areas such as consulting, commissioning, engineering, project appraisal, quality control, know-how transfer, support, and plant supply.

== Listings and shareholding ==
The equity shares of Cipla are listed on the Bombay Stock Exchange, where it is a constituent of the BSE SENSEX index, and the National Stock Exchange of India, where it is a constituent of the CNX Nifty. Its Global Depository Receipts (GDRs) are listed on the Luxembourg Stock Exchange.

As of 31 December 2022, the promoter group, Y. K. Hamied and his family, held around 33.61% equity shares in Cipla. Individual shareholders hold approximately 14.72% of its shares. SBI Mutual Fund, LIC etc. are the largest non-promoter shareholders in the Company. In January 2024, Samina Hamied resigned from her position as the Executive Vice Chairperson of Cipla. She continued to serve the company as a non-executive director subject to rotational retirement.

Shareholders (as on 31-December-2022)	Shareholding
Promoter Group	33.61%
Mutual funds	14.09%
Financial Institution/Banks/Insurance	4.96%
Foreign Institutional Investors (FII)	28.39%
Corporate Bodies	0.53%
Individuals	14.72%
NRIs/OCBs	0.88%
ADRs/GDRs	NIL
Others	2.82%
Total	100.00%

== Awards and recognitions ==
- In 1980, Cipla won Chemexcil Award for Excellence for exports.
- In 2006, Cipla won Dun & Bradstreet American Express Corporate Awards.
- In 2007, Forbes included Cipla in the 200 'Best under a billion' list of best small Asian companies.
- In 2012, Cipla received the Thomson Reuters India Innovation Award.
- In 2015, Cipla stood third in the India's Most Reputed Brands (Pharmaceutical) list, in a study conducted by BlueBytes, a Media Analytics firm in association with TRA Research, a brand insights organization (both part of the Comniscient Group).

== Criticism ==
=== Emergency contraception ===
In August 2007, Cipla launched an emergency contraception drug "i-pill" sold over the counter. The drug sparked controversy as it was available without prescription and contained a large amount of API per dosage.

=== Generic drugs ===
In the late 1960s, Cipla began manufacturing a new, patented drug, propranolol, without the permission of the drug's patent holder, Imperial Chemical Industries; a protest was filed with the Indian government. The CEO of Cipla pressured the government of Indira Gandhi to change India's patent laws to eliminate patents that directly covered drugs, and instead to allow only patents that covered methods to make drugs so that Cipla could produce low-priced generic drugs. Since then, Cipla has also produced a low-cost drug to treat HIV, and expanded operations into several developing countries. The changes made led to criticism of both India's patent laws and Cipla. India reinstated patents on drugs in 2005.

== See also ==
- Pharmaceutical industry in India
- Generic drug
- List of pharmaceutical companies
