= Usha Rani Tomar =

Indian politician

MP
- In office 8th Lok Sabha 1984-1989
- Preceded by: Indra Kumari
- Succeeded by: Satya Pal Malik
- Constituency: Aligarh (Uttar Pradesh)

Personal details
- Born: Aligarh, Uttar Pradesh, India
- Citizenship: India
- Party: Indian National Congress
- Education: Aligarh, Uttar Pradesh
- Occupation: Politician

Usha Rani Tomar was a member of the 8th Lok Sabha of India. She represented the Aligarh (Lok Sabha constituency) of Uttar Pradesh and is a member of the Indian National Congress party.
