= Yusuf Hamied =

Indian scientist and businessman

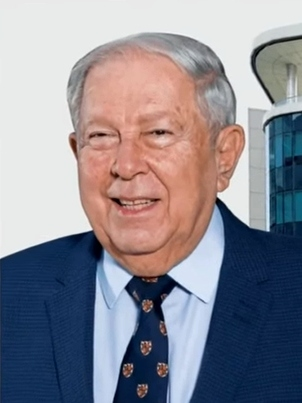
- Hamied on a 2025 stamp of India
- Born: 25 July 1936 (age 90); Wilno, Wilno Voivodeship, Poland (now Vilnius, Lithuania)
- Education: Christ's College, Cambridge
- Title: Chairman, Cipla
- Successor: M. K. Hamied
- Spouse: Farida
- Children: none
- Parent(s): Khwaja Abdul Hamied (father); Luba Derczanska (mother)
- Awards: Padma Bhushan

Yusuf Khwaja Hamied (born 25 July 1936) is an Indian scientist, billionaire businessman and the chairman of Cipla, a generic pharmaceuticals company founded by his father Khwaja Abdul Hamied in 1935. He is also an elected fellow of the Indian National Science Academy.

== Early life ==
Hamied was born in Vilnius, then Poland, now Lithuania, and raised in Bombay (now Mumbai). His Indian Muslim father and Russophone Lithuanian Jewish mother, Luba Derczanska met in pre-war Berlin, where they were university students. Hamied was educated at the Cathedral and John Connon School and St. Xavier's College, Mumbai. He went to England in 1954, and earned a BA in chemistry in 1957, followed by a PhD, all from Christ's College, Cambridge. He uses his chemistry notebooks from Cambridge when he develops new syntheses of drugs.

== Career ==
Hamied is best known outside India for defying large Western pharmaceutical companies in order to provide generic AIDS drugs and treatments for other ailments primarily affecting people in poor countries. Hamied has led efforts to eradicate AIDS in the developing world and to give patients life-saving medicines regardless of their ability to pay, and has been characterized as a modern-day Robin Hood.

In 1961, Hamied founded the Indian Drug Manufacturers Association, which lobbied for reform to Indian patent law through the 1970 Indian Patents Act. Unlike British patent law, this act only allowed drug manufacturing processes to be patented, not molecules themselves. Hamied stated, "I don't want to make money off these diseases which cause the whole fabric of society to crumble". In September 2011, in a piece about how he was trying to radically lower costs of biotech drugs for cancer, diabetes and other noncommunicable diseases, The New York Times wrote of Hamied:

Dr. Yusuf K. Hamied, chairman of the Indian drug giant Cipla Ltd., electrified the global health community a decade ago when he said he could produce cocktails of AIDS medicines for $1 per day — a fraction of the price charged by branded pharmaceutical companies. That price has since fallen to 20 cents per day, and more than six million people in the developing world now receive treatment, up from little more than 2,000 in 2001.

Hamied has also been influential in pioneering the development of multi-drug combination pills (also known as fixed-dose combinations, or FDCs), notably for HIV/AIDS, tuberculosis (TB), asthma and other ailments chiefly affecting developing countries, as well as the development of pediatric formulations of drugs, especially those benefiting children in poor settings. These innovations have greatly expanded access to medicine and increased drug safety by ensuring proper dosages are taken. He is also highly regarded for his role in expanding the production of bulk drugs and "active pharmaceutical ingredients" (APIs, the active chemical components in medicines) in India.

Hamied has been a major benefactor to Cambridge. In 2009 the Yusuf Hamied Centre was opened at Christ's College. The centre features a bronze portrait bust of Hamied by fellow Christ's College alumnus, Anthony Smith. The college also has a Todd-Hamied Fellow in chemistry, a post held by Professor Chris Abell, FRS, from 1986 until his death in October 2020.

In 2018, he donated to the chemistry department at Cambridge to support the 1702 Chair of Chemistry, the oldest professorship in the subject there, which has been renamed after him as the Yusuf Hamied 1702 Chair. There is also a Hamied Laboratory for Chemical Synthesis & Catalysis in the department, as well as a Todd-Hamied Seminar Room and Todd-Hamied Laboratory, the last two (and Christ's fellowship) being a tribute also to Alexander, Lord Todd, Nobel laureate in chemistry, whom Hamied described as 'my mentor and guide over the years' since he completed his Ph.D. at Christ's College with Todd. Todd himself was 1702 Professor from 1944 to 1971, as well as Master of Christ's. In 2020 it was announced that Hamied had made a substantial donation to Cambridge University's chemistry department. This donation led to the foundation of the Hamied Scholars Programme, and the department has subsequently been renamed the Yusuf Hamied Department of Chemistry until 2050. Yusuf Hamied and the Cipla Foundation made a Rs 20 crore donation to IISER Pune for a state of the art chemistry facility that would be used in outreach programmes.

Hamied has been the subject of in-depth profiles in The New York Times, Time magazine, The Guardian, Le Monde, The Economist, the Financial Times, The Times (London), Corriere della Sera, Der Spiegel, Wired and numerous other leading publications, as well as on television outlets such as ABC News, the BBC, CNN and CBS' 60 Minutes. In February 2013, Hamied announced his retirement plans from Cipla after remaining managing director of the company for 52 years. That year, Forbes magazine included him in its list of richest Indians.

== Awards and recognition ==
He was awarded the Padma Bhushan, India's third highest civilian honour by Government of India in 2005. Hamied was recognized as the CNN-News18 Indian of the Year in the category of business in 2012 "for taking on multinational pharma companies and making some of the essential drugs more affordable to the masses in the developing countries." In late 2013, he was also named one of the India's "25 Greatest Global Living Legends" by news broadcaster NDTV. He was also recently interviewed for the Creating Emerging Markets project at the Harvard Business School, discussing at length his strategies to provide AIDS treatments and other drugs to help treat poor people in the developing world.

== Media ==
Hamied's role in the battle for mass antiretroviral treatment in Africa is portrayed in the 2013 documentary Fire in the Blood. In its review of the film, India Today noted that "the story of Yusuf Hamied will make every Indian proud as he was the only man who decided to walk against the tide and sell drugs to save lives without focusing on profits."

== Personal life ==
Hamied married to Farida and they have no children. They live in London and Mumbai. His younger brother, M. K. Hamied, is Cipla's non-executive vice-chairman. The latter has three children, including Samina Vaziralli, who is expected to take over leadership of Cipla in the future.

In May 2021, Forbes estimated Hamied's net worth at US$ 3.3 billion. As per Forbes list of India’s 100 richest tycoons, dated 9 October 2024, Yusuf Hamied & family is ranked 53rd with a net worth of $5.7 Billion.
