= Anil Parashar =

Member of the Uttar Pradesh Legislative Assembly

Member of the Uttar Pradesh Legislative Assembly
- Incumbent
- Assumed office March 2017
- Preceded by: Zameer Ullah Khan
- Constituency: Koil

Personal details
- Born: 5 September 1971 (age 54) Aligarh, Uttar Pradesh
- Party: Bharatiya Janata Party
- Spouse: Hemlata Parashar
- Children: 2
- Parent: Ram Prasad Sarmah (father)
- Education: Bachelor of Laws
- Alma mater: Dr. Bhimrao Ambedkar University
- Occupation: Lawyer
- Profession: Politician

Anil Parashar is an Indian politician, lawyer, and a member of the 18th Uttar Pradesh Assembly from the Koil Assembly constituency of Aligarh district. He is a member of the Bharatiya Janata Party.

== Early life ==
Anil Parashar was born on 5 September 1971 in Aligarh, Uttar Pradesh, to a Hindu Brahmin family of Ram Prasad Sarmah. He married Hemlata Parashar on 5 January 1976, and they had two children.

== Education ==
Anil Parashar completed his education with a Bachelor of Science and later a Bachelor of Laws at Dr. Bhimrao Ambedkar University, Agar.

== Posts held ==
#	From	To	Position	Comments
01	2017	2022	Member, 17th Uttar Pradesh Assembly	
02	2022	Incumbent	Member, 18th Uttar Pradesh Assembly	

== See also ==
- Koil Assembly constituency
- 18th Uttar Pradesh Assembly
- Uttar Pradesh Legislative Assembly
