= Zafar Alam (Uttar Pradesh politician) =

Indian politician

Members of the Uttar Pradesh Legislative Assembly
- In office March 2012 – March 2017
- Constituency: Aligarh

Personal details
- Born: 7 December 1944 (age 81) Aligarh, United Provinces, British India
- Party: Samajwadi Party
- Spouse: Farida Zafar

Zafar Alam is an Indian politician from the Samajwadi Party. He served as an MLA following the 2012 Uttar Pradesh Assembly election from Aligarh constituency.

He lost his seat in the 2017 Uttar Pradesh Assembly election to Sanjeev Raja of the Bharatiya Janata Party.
