= Shiv Kumar Shastri =

Indian politician and social reformer

- Constituency: Aligarh

Personal details
- Born: 15 October 1915 Aligarh, Uttar Pradesh
- Died: 3 September 1989 (aged 74) Aligarh
- Party: Bhartiya Kranti Dal
- Children: 3 sons & 4 daughters

Shiv Kumar Shastri (1915–1989) was an Indian politician, social reformer and Vedic scholar. He won the 1967 (Fourth) Lok Sabha Elections as an independent candidate. In 1971, he joined Bhartiya Kranti Dal party (led by Shri Chaudhary Charan Singh) and fought the 1971 (Fifth) Lok Sabha Elections. He was the only elected candidate out of 101 candidates of the party in that election.

== Personal life ==
He was born on 15 October 1915 at Village Arya Nagar, District Aligarh (U.P.). He was Sisodia Rajput. His father was Shri Ram Chandra Singh and his mother was Smt. Gayatri Devi. His wife's name was Smt. Somlata Devi. He was a member of the Fourth and Fifth Aligarh (Lok Sabha constituency).

== Education ==
He studied at Gurukul Suryakund, Badaun (Vidya Bhushan), Sanskrit University, Varanasi (Shastri), and Sanskrit Association, Calcutta (Kavya and Viyakaran Tirth).

== Designation ==
He was president of Arya Pratinidhi Sabha, Uttar Pradesh and chancellor of Gurukul Brindaban (Mathura). He was member of Agra University executive committee; Sarvadeshik Arya Pratinidhi Sabha, Delhi; Fourth Lok Sabha, 1967–70; Fifth Lok Sabha, 1971–77; and Estimates Committee, Lok Sabha.

== Social activities ==
He was involved in social reforms through Arya Samaj, Improvements for Harijans and services for refugees.

== Writing ==
He wrote many books, including Vishwashanti Ka Vedic Sandesh, Shruti Saurabh, Dharti par Swarg, Vedic Varna Vyawastha & Yogiraj Krishna.
