= Abdul Majeed Khwaja =

Indian lawyer and activist (1885–1962)

- Born: 1885; Aligarh, North-Western Provinces, British India
- Died: 2 December 1962 (aged 76–77); Aligarh, Uttar Pradesh, India
- Education: Cambridge University
- Occupations: Lawyer, educationist, social reformer
- Spouse: Begum Khursheed Khwaja
- Father: Khwaja Muhammad Yusuf

Abdul Majeed Khwaja (1885 – 2 December 1962) was an Indian lawyer, educationist, social reformer and freedom fighter from Aligarh. In 1920, he along with others founded Jamia Millia Islamia and later served its vice chancellor and chancellor.

A liberal Muslim, he was deeply committed to Mahatma Gandhi's ethical approach of nonviolent resistance. He actively opposed the partition of India in 1947 and dedicated his entire life to the promotion of Hindu-Muslim harmony.

He made a lasting contribution to the education of Indian Muslims in the modern era.

He died on 2 December 1962 and was buried in the family graveyard adjacent to the shrine of the Sufi saint Shah Jamal on the outskirts of Aligarh.

== Family background ==
Abdul Majeed was the younger son of Khwaja Muhammad Yusuf, a prominent lawyer and landowner of Aligarh. Abdul Majeed firmly believed that Western-style scientific education was critically important for the social and economic development of Indian Muslims.

Khwaja Muhammad Yusuf was one of the earliest supporters of the Aligarh Movement under the leadership of Sir Syed Ahmad Khan, the founder of the famous Muhammadan Anglo-Oriental College which later developed into the Aligarh Muslim University. Khwaja Yusuf donated large sums to the Muhammadan Anglo-Oriental College Fund Committee and also toured the country along with Zahoor Hussain, and Zainul Abdeen. Also accompanying the group were the much younger duo of Syed Mahmood and Hamied Ullah Khan to raise funds for the proposed Muhammadan Anglo-Oriental College.

Khwaja Muhammad Yusuf was also very active in the affairs of the Scientific Society founded earlier in 1864 by Sir Syed to translate Western works into Urdu.

== Education ==
Abdul Majeed was initially educated at home in the traditional manner by reputed private tutors who taught him the Quran, Arabic, Urdu, Farsi and social etiquette, etc.

He also received his education from Govt. M.A.O. College Lahore.

However his father Khwaja Muhammad Yusuf, made sure that his son also got the best possible modern Western style education. Abdul Majeed was therefore sent in 1906 for higher studies to Cambridge University, England, as a member of Christ's College Cambridge. He graduated in history and was called to the Bar in 1910. Jawaharlal Nehru, the first Prime Minister of the Republic of India, Sir Shah Sulaiman, the eminent jurist, and Muhammad Iqbal, the famous philosopher and poet, were among his contemporaries in Cambridge. It was in Cambridge that he first saw and heard Barrister Mohandas Karamchand Gandhi of South African fame and, then, a great admirer of British liberalism.

== Marriage ==
Abdul Majeed Khwaja had three sons: Jamal Khwaja, Rasheed Khwaja and Ajmal Khwaja and six daughters.

His wife, Begum Khursheed Khwaja [d. 1981] was the daughter of Mahomed Hameed Ullah Khan who was the son of Maulvi Sami Ullah, and Begum Akhtar Sarbuland Jung.

Maulvi Sami Ullah was appointed Companion of the Order of St Michael and St George (CMG) for diplomatic services rendered to the British Empire in Egypt. This Order is the sixth-most senior in the British honours system.

She was the first born of her parents. She was amongst the very first Muslim ladies in Aligarh to come out of purdah. She was a social and political activist and worked diligently for women's education and freedom from British colonial rule. She interacted closely with the Nehru family, especially Padmaja Naidu, the daughter of the famous Sarojini Naidu, who was her classmate at Hyderabad and Vijayalaksmi Pandit, sister of Jawaharlal Nehru.

She was the first among the Muslims of Allahabad to get her daughters admitted as boarders in the famous St. Mary's Convent Inter College, Allahabad. The young Indira Gandhi was also a student at this Convent for a short period.

In the early 1930s Begum Khursheed Khwaja founded and managed the Hamidia Girls School in the interior of the city of Allahabad to promote education among the relatively weaker section of Muslim women. This primary school has now developed into a Hamidia Girls Degree College affiliated to the Allahabad University.

During the days of the Non-co-operation movement she was torn between divided loyalties to her father, a Westernized liberal aristocrat who supported British rule, and her husband, an Indian freedom fighter who, under Mahatma Gandhi's inspiration, had made a bonfire of his expensive and fashionable Savile Row English suits and switched over to wearing khadi [Indian handspun and hand-woven cloth].

In fact Khursheed Khwaja set fire to all her fashionable garments and donated her ornaments to the freedom movement. She did not waver even when dozens of policemen surrounded the house to arrest her husband, who calmly went along with them for a long stay in the district jail.

She died on 7 July 1981 at the age of 87 and was buried in the family graveyard adjacent to the shrine of the Sufi saint Shah Jamal on the outskirts of Aligarh.

== Career ==
Returning home from England in 1910, Abdul Majeed Khwaja built up a legal practice first at the District Court, Aligarh and later at Patna High Court. At the call of Mahatma Gandhi he gave up his practice in 1919, joined the Civil Disobedience Movement as also the Khilafat movement, and served six-months' imprisonment. The next six years (1919–1925) were devoted largely to nurturing the fledgling Jamia Millia Islamia.

He resumed legal practice at Allahabad High Court in 1926. Domestic and health reasons kept him out of active politics until the end of 1943, though he continued to support both the Jamia and the Indian National Congress party.

The period from 1943 to 1948 was very stressful for Abdul Majeed Khwaja. The demand for the creation of Pakistan based on the two-nation theory caused him great anguish. He had suffered a heart attack in 1942; nevertheless he returned to the political arena and devoted all of his energies to preserving the unity of India.

In 1936 Khwaja was appointed as Chancellor of the Jamia Millia Islamia on the insistence of Zakir Husain. Zakir Sahab was subsequently elected as vice-president and eventually in 1967 as the third President of India.

Khwaja continued to serve as Chancellor of the Jamia Millia Islamia until his death on 2 December 1962.

== Political work ==
Abdul Majeed Khwaja was uncompromising in his commitment to Islamic liberalism and secular nationalism. He was vehemently opposed to the fragmentation of Indian society on the basis of caste, creed and religion and hence the creation of Pakistan. Gandhiji was the only Indian leader he looked up to for inspiration and guidance. He also worked closely with Chittaranjan Das, Maulana Azad, Dr. Mukhtar Ahmed Ansari, T.A.K. Sherwani and Sir Tej Bahadur Sapru.

Under Mahatma Gandhi's inspiration he gave up his flourishing legal practice at Patna in 1919, joined the struggle for Indian freedom and suffered imprisonment for his role in the Civil Disobedience and Khilafat movement.

The raising of the demand for Pakistan by Muhammad Ali Jinnah and others stirred him into actively opposing the partition of India on religious lines. He and some close associates founded the umbrella All India Muslim Majlis to co-ordinate the activities of all Muslims opposed to partition on the basis of the Two-Nation Theory and Abdul Majeed Khwaja was unanimously elected as its president. In this capacity he met the 1946 Cabinet Mission to India at Delhi and also extensively toured the country to influence Muslim public opinion in favour of preserving the unity of India.

He and others like him patiently bore the ire of the separatist forces without losing faith in their mission. Though his efforts to keep India united failed, he continued to work to protect the national fabric with stalwarts like Maulana Azad, Maulana Hifzur Rahman Seoharwi, N.A. Sherwani, and others.

But for him the assassination of Gandhi on 30 January 1948 was a shock he could never overcome and thereafter Khwaja almost faded out of active election politics in independent India.

It was Abdul Majeed Khwaja, who recited the Quran at the funeral service of Mahatma Gandhi.

== Educational work ==
Jamia Millia Islamia was founded at Aligarh on 29 October 1920, as an institution of higher Western style education managed entirely by Indians without any British support or control.

The Jamia Millia Islamia was the brainchild of Mohammad Ali Jauhar, Mukhtar Ahmed Ansari, and Hakim Ajmal Khan.

Muhammad Ali was the first principal of the college, but due to his intense political activism, he decided to abdicate in favour of his close friend and associate, Abdul Majeed Khwaja.

The young Zakir Husain was the most prominent student leader of the Muhammadan Anglo-Oriental College to join the Jamia at its very inception and formation, and his commitment to the cause led him to join the staff as an honorary instructor.

In this critical period, the greatest measure of moral and material support came from Mohandas Karamchand Gandhi through his disciple, G.D. Birla. But there were other sources of much needed sustenance also, such as Hakim Ajmal Khan, Dr. Mukhtar Ahmed Ansari, and several dedicated teachers at the Jamia, like Maulana Aslam Jairajpuri, Shafiqur Rahman Kidwai, Kalat Sahab and Aqil Sahab, among others.

In 1925, with Ghandhi's and Hakim Ajmal Khan's concurrence and blessings, Abdul Majeed Khwaja shifted the Jamia from Aligarh to Karol Bagh, Delhi and handed over charge to Dr. Zakir Hussain, who had just returned from Germany after completing his higher studies in Economics.

After the death of Dr. Mukhtar Ahmed Ansari in 1936 the mantle of the Chancellorship of the Jamia fell on the shoulders of Abdul Majeed Khwaja. A responsibility he shouldered till his death in 1962. In line with his family tradition Abdul Majeed Khwaja took great interest in the affairs of his alma mater, Aligarh Muslim University. He was a generous donor and served on the Aligarh Muslim University Executive Council for many years.

== Miscellaneous ==
He was the author of the book The Early Life of the First Student of the M.A.O. College, published by the Allahabad Law Journal Press, Allahabad, 1916.

== Books ==
Deewan-e-Shaida poetry
