= Mukta Raja =

Indian politician

Mukta Raja is an Indian politician who is serving as Member of 18th Uttar Pradesh Legislative Assembly from Aligarh Assembly constituency. She got 1,20,389 votes in 2022 Uttar Pradesh Legislative Assembly election.
