= Debai Assembly constituency =

Constituency of the Uttar Pradesh legislative assembly in India

Debai
- Constituency No. 68 for the Uttar Pradesh Legislative Assembly

Constituency details
- Country: India
- Region: North India
- State: Uttar Pradesh
- District: Bulandshahar
- Total electors: 3,47,780 (2022)
- Reservation: None

Member of Legislative Assembly
- 18th Uttar Pradesh Legislative Assembly
- Incumbent Chandrapal Singh
- Party: Bharatiya Janata Party
- Elected year: 2022

Debai Assembly constituency is one of the 403 constituencies of the Uttar Pradesh Legislative Assembly, India. It is a part of the Bulandshahar district and one of the five assembly constituencies in the Bulandshahr Lok Sabha constituency. First election in this assembly constituency was held in 1957 after the "DPACO (1956)" (delimitation order) was passed in 1956. After the "Delimitation of Parliamentary and Assembly Constituencies Order" was passed in 2008, the constituency was assigned identification number 68.

== Wards / Areas ==
Extent of Debai Assembly constituency is Debai Tehsil; PCs Bagsara, Bibiyana, Mau, Dubka, Suratgarh Urf Lodhai & Rajour of Anupshahar KC of Anupshahr Tehsil.

== Members of the Legislative Assembly ==
Year	Member	Party
1957	Himmat Singh	Bharatiya Jana Sangh
1962	Himmat Singh	Bharatiya Jana Sangh
1967	Himmat Singh	Bharatiya Jana Sangh
1969	Himmat Singh	Bharatiya Jana Sangh
1974	Himmat Singh	Bharatiya Jana Sangh
1977	Himmat Singh	Janata Party
1980	Swami Nempal	Indian National Congress (I)
1985	Hitesh Kumari	Indian National Congress
1989	Swami Nempal	Janata Dal
1991	Ram Singh	Bharatiya Janata Party
1993	Ram Singh	Bharatiya Janata Party
1996	Kalyan Singh	Bharatiya Janata Party
1997^	Ram Singh	Bharatiya Janata Party
2002	Kalyan Singh	Rashtriya Kranti Party
2002^	Rajveer Singh	Rashtriya Kranti Party
2007	Bhagwan Sharma	Bahujan Samaj Party
2012	Bhagwan Sharma	Samajwadi Party
2017	Anita Singh Rajput	Bharatiya Janata Party
2022	Chandrapal Singh	Bharatiya Janata Party

== Election results ==
=== 2027 ===
2027 Uttar Pradesh Legislative Assembly election: Debai
Party	Candidate	Votes	%	±%
INDIA				
NDA				
BSP				
NOTA	None of the above			
Majority				
Turnout				
gain from		Swing		

=== 2022 ===
2022 Uttar Pradesh Legislative Assembly election: Debai
Party	Candidate	Votes	%	±%
BJP	Chandrapal Singh	128,640	58.6	+5.31
SP	Harish Kumar	60,615	27.61	+5.6
BSP	Karanpal Singh	24,516	11.17	−10.27
NOTA	None of the above	1,218	0.55	−0.44
Majority		68,025	30.99	−0.29
Turnout		219,519	63.02	+0.09
BJP hold		Swing		

=== 2017 ===
2017 Uttar Pradesh Legislative Assembly election: Debai
Party	Candidate	Votes	%	±%
BJP	Anita Singh Rajput	111,807	53.29	
SP	Harish Kumar	46,177	22.01	
BSP	Devendra Bhardwaj	44,974	21.44	
RLD	Satyaveer Singh	2,647	1.26	
NOTA	None of the above	2,048	0.99	
Majority		65,630	31.28	
Turnout		209,809	62.93	

=== 2012 ===
2012 General Elections: Debai
Party	Candidate	Votes	%	±%
SP	Bhagwan Sharma	62,969	34.37	−
Independent	Rajveer Singh	59,372	32.4	−
BSP	Vinod Upadhyay	38,160	20.83	−
	Remainder 12 candidates	22,718	12.41	−
Majority		3,597	1.96	−
Turnout		183,219	61.79	−
SP gain from BSP		Swing		

== See also ==
- Bulandshahr Lok Sabha constituency
- Bulandshahar district
- Sixteenth Legislative Assembly of Uttar Pradesh
- Uttar Pradesh Legislative Assembly
