= Devendra Singh Yadav =

Indian politician

Kunwar Devendra Singh Yadav

Member of parliament, Lok Sabha
- In office October 1999 – May 2009
- Preceded by: Mahadeepak Singh Shakya
- Succeeded by: Kalyan Singh
- Constituency: Etah

Personal details
- Born: 1 January 1951 (age 75) Etah, Uttar Pradesh, India
- Party: BJP
- Spouse: Urmila Yadav
- Children: 5 daughters
- As of 21 September, 2006

Devendra Singh Yadav (born 1 January 1951) is an Indian politician for the Etah (Lok Sabha Constituency) in Uttar Pradesh.
