= Atrauli Assembly constituency =

Constituency of the Uttar Pradesh legislative assembly in India

Atrauli
- Constituency No. 73 for the Uttar Pradesh Legislative Assembly

Constituency details
- Country: India
- Region: North India
- State: Uttar Pradesh
- District: Aligarh
- Lok Sabha constituency: Aligarh
- Total electors: 4,04,658 (2022)
- Reservation: None

Member of Legislative Assembly
- 18th Uttar Pradesh Legislative Assembly
- Incumbent Sandeep Singh
- Party: Bharatiya Janata Party
- Elected year: 2022

Atrauli Assembly constituency is one of the 403 constituencies of the Uttar Pradesh Legislative Assembly, India. It is a part of the Aligarh district and one of the five assembly constituencies in the Aligarh Lok Sabha constituency. First election in this assembly constituency was held in 1952 after the "DPACO (1951)" (delimitation order) was passed in 1951. After the "Delimitation of Parliamentary and Assembly Constituencies Order" was passed in 2008, the constituency was assigned identification number 73.

== Wards / Areas ==
Extent of Atrauli Assembly constituency is KCs Atrauli, Dadon, Bijoli, PCs Gaonkhera, Ganiyawali, Jujharka, Gobli, Chendauli Buzurg, Bhavigarh, Koreh Raghupura, Fazalpur, Rehmapur, Gajipur, Tebthu, Madapur, Utara, Puraini Ismailpur of Barala KC & Atrauli MB of Atrauli Tehsil.

== Members of the Legislative Assembly ==
Election	Name	Party
1951	Shriniwas	Indian National Congress
1957	Nek Ram Sharma	Indian National Congress
1962	Babu Singh	Socialist Party
1967	Kalyan Singh	Bharatiya Jana Sangh
1969	Kalyan Singh	Bharatiya Jana Sangh
1974	Kalyan Singh	Bharatiya Jana Sangh
1977	Kalyan Singh	Janata Party
1980	Anwar Khan	Indian National Congress
1985	Kalyan Singh	Bharatiya Janata Party
1989	Kalyan Singh	Bharatiya Janata Party
1991	Kalyan Singh	Bharatiya Janata Party
1993	Kalyan Singh	Bharatiya Janata Party
1996	Kalyan Singh	Bharatiya Janata Party
2002	Kalyan Singh	Rashtriya Kranti Party
2004^	Prem Lata Devi	Bharatiya Janata Party
2007	Prem Lata Devi	Bharatiya Janata Party
2012	Viresh Yadav	Samajwadi Party
2017	Sandeep Singh	Bharatiya Janata Party
2022	Sandeep Singh	Bharatiya Janata Party

^By Poll

== Election results ==
=== 2027 ===
2027 Uttar Pradesh Legislative Assembly election: Atrauli
Party	Candidate	Votes	%	±%
INDIA				
NDA				
BSP				
NOTA	None of the above			
Majority				
Turnout				
gain from		Swing		

=== 2022 ===
2022 Uttar Pradesh Legislative Assembly election: Atrauli
Party	Candidate	Votes	%	±%
BJP	Sandeep Singh	125,691	52.03	▲2.42
SP	Viresh Yadav	86,367	35.75	▲8.05
BSP	Omveer Singh	23,134	9.58	▼9.78
NOTA	None of the above	1,149	0.48	▼0.09
Majority		39,324	16.28	▼5.63
Turnout		241,581	60.02	▼0.78
BJP hold		Swing	▲2.42	

=== 2017 ===
U. P. Legislative Assembly Election, 2017: Atrauli
Party	Candidate	Votes	%	±%
BJP	Sandeep Singh	115,397	49.61	
SP	Viresh Yadav	64,430	27.70	
BSP	Iliyas Chaudhary	45,041	19.36	
NOTA	None of the above	1,325	0.57	
Majority		50,967	21.91	
Turnout		232,591	60.80	
BJP gain from SP		Swing	▲22.98	

=== 2012 ===
U. P. Legislative Assembly Election, 2012: Atrauli
Party	Candidate	Votes	%	±%
SP	Viresh Yadav	54,785	26.63	
JKP(R)	Prem Lata Devi	45,918	22.32	
BSP	Saqib Khan	42,436	20.63	
INC	Bijendra Singh	30,517	14.84	
BJP	Rajesh Kumar Bhardwaj	22,671	11.02	
Majority		8,867	4.31	
Turnout		2,05,699	62.83	
SP gain from BJP		Swing		

== See also ==
- Aligarh district
- Aligarh Lok Sabha constituency
- Sixteenth Legislative Assembly of Uttar Pradesh
- Uttar Pradesh Legislative Assembly
