= Dibai =

- City
- Nickname: DIBAI MIRROR
- Location in Uttar Pradesh, India
- Coordinates: 28.22°N 78.25°E
- Country: India
- State: Uttar Pradesh
- District: Bulandshahr
- Elevation: 184 m (604 ft)

Population (2001)
  - Total: 34,853

Languages
  - Official: Hindi
- Time zone: UTC+05:30 (IST)
- PIN: 203393
- Telephone code: STD code 05734

Dibai (also spelt as Debai) is a city and a municipal board in Bulandshahr district. It is a tehsil City and also a constituency of legislative assembly in the state of Uttar Pradesh, India. Dibai had a population of 39902 according to census 2011.

== Geography ==
Dibai is located at 28.22°N 78.25°E. It has an average elevation of 184 metres (603 feet).

== Demographics ==
As of 2001 India census, Dibai had a population of 34,853. Males constitute 53% of the population and females 47%. Dibai has an average literacy rate of 50%, lower than the national average of 59.5%: male literacy is 58% and, female literacy is 41%. In Dibai, 16% of the population is under 6 years of age.

== Notables ==
Intizar Hussain, eminent Urdu poet and fiction writer of Lahore, Pakistan was born in Dibai.

Hitesh Kumari, MLA from Dibai from 1985 to 1989.
