= Rashtriya Kranti Party =

Defunct political party in India

- Abbreviation: RTKP
- Leader: Kalyan Singh
- Secretary: Rajveer Singh
- Founder: Kalyan Singh
- Founded: 1999
- Dissolved: 2004
- Split from: Bharatiya Janata Party
- Merged into: Bharatiya Janata Party
- Ideology: Hindutva
- Political position: Right-wing
- ECI Status: dissolved party
- Alliance: Samajwadi Party (2003-2004)

Election symbol
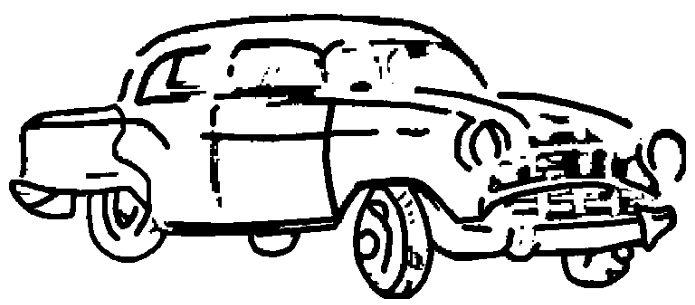

Rashtriya Kranti Party (RTKP, transl. National Revolutionary Party) is a defunct regional political party in the Indian state of Uttar Pradesh. It was founded by Kalyan Singh. The party was formed when Kalyan Singh had controversy with BJP Party. On 3 February 2004, the party was formally merged with BJP.

In the 2002 Uttar Pradesh Legislative Assembly election, the party won four seats. The party had coalided with Samajwadi Party in 2003, and Mulayam Singh Yadav became chief minister of Uttar Pradesh. Kalyan Singh's son Rajveer Singh became health nminister in Mulayam Singh Yadav's cabinet from 2003 to 2007.

== History ==
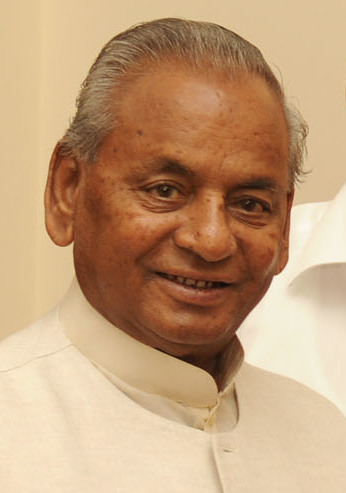
Kalyan Singh, founder of the party

As a member of the Lodhi community, Singh commanded support among Other Backward Class (OBC) groups, and his affiliation with the BJP had allowed it to expand its support beyond its traditional upper-caste base. However, he began to be seen as a "patron of the backward castes" by upper-caste members of his own party, and began to face opposition as a result. Dissension within the party occurred at the same time as an increase in crime that Singh's administration was unable to control, and in May 1999, 36 BJP legislators resigned in protest at the continuation of Singh's administration.

Singh returned to the BJP in January 2004, and was made head of the party's state-level election committee for the 2004 Indian general election. He successfully contested the election from the Bulandshahar Lok Sabha Constituency.

== Electoral history ==
=== Uttar Pradesh Vidhan Sabha (Lower House) ===
Term	Assembly election	Seats contested	Seats won	Popular votes	% of votes
14th Legislative assembly	2002	335	4	1,812,535	3.38%

== List of RTKP elected Uttar Pradesh Legislative members in 2002 ==
No.	Name	Date of appointment	Date of retirement	Constituency
1	Kalyan Singh	2002	2004	Atrauli
2	Kalyan Singh	2002	2002	Debai
3	Sundar Singh	2002	2007	Siana
4	Devendra Pratap	2002	2007	Soron
Legislative member who won in by-election
5	Rajveer Singh	2002	2007	Debai

== See also ==
- Bharatiya Janata Party
- Chief Minister of Uttar Pradesh
- List of political parties in India
