= Vipin Kumar David =

Indian politician (born 1970)

Member of the Uttar Pradesh Legislative Assembly
- Incumbent
- Assumed office March 2022
- Constituency: Etah

Personal details
- Born: Etah, Uttar Pradesh, India
- Party: Bharatiya Janata Party
- Spouse: Premlata
- Parent: Ganga Prasad (father)
- Education: Bachelor of Arts
- Alma mater: Delhi University
- Occupation: Politician

Vipin Kumar David (born 20 April 1970) is an Indian politician and social worker from Uttar Pradesh. He is a member of the Bharatiya Janata Party serving as a member of the 18th Uttar Pradesh Assembly from Etah Assembly constituency.

== Early life and education ==
David was born in Etah to a Lodhi Rajpoot family of Ganga Prasad. He married Premlata on 5 January 1995. He completed his Bachelor of Arts at a college affiliated with the Delhi University in 1991.

== Career ==
David won from Etah Assembly constituency representing Bharatiya Janata Party in the 2022 Uttar Pradesh Legislative Assembly election. He polled 97,539 votes and defeated his nearest rival, jugendra singh yadav of the Samajwadi Party, by a margin of 4,767 votes.

== Position held ==
#	From	To	Position	Comments
01	2022	Incumbent	Member, 18th Uttar Pradesh Assembly	
