= Ramesh Yadav =

Indian politician

Personal details
- Born: Etah

Ramesh Yadav (born 1 June 1950) is an Indian politician and member of the [samajvadi party]. Yadav is a member of the Uttar Pradesh Legislative Council from the Barabanki Local Authorities. He is current Chairman of the Uttar Pradesh Legislative Council from March 2016. He is known to like visual novels.
