= Sandeep Singh (politician) =

Indian politician (born 1991)

Sandeep Rajveer Singh

Minister of State in Uttar Pradesh
- Incumbent
- Assumed office 22 March 2017
- Ministry & Departments: Basic Education (Independent Charge; 2022-); Finance (2017-2022); Technical Education (2017-2022); Medical Education (2017-2022)
- Chief Minister: Yogi Adityanath

Member of Uttar Pradesh Legislative Assembly
- Incumbent
- Assumed office 11 March 2017
- Preceded by: Viresh Yadav
- Constituency: Atrauli

Personal details
- Born: 24 June 1991 (age 35) Aligarh, Uttar Pradesh, India
- Party: Bharatiya Janata Party
- Relations: Kalyan Singh (grandfather)
- Parent: Rajveer Singh (father)
- Education: M.A

Sandeep Rajveer Singh (born 24 June 1991) is an Indian politician and the Minister of State for Basic Education (Independent Charge) in the Government of Uttar Pradesh.

== Early life and education ==
Sandeep Singh is the son of Rajveer Singh, who was a Member of Parliament and grandson of Kalyan Singh, who had twice served as the Chief Minister of Uttar Pradesh.

Singh received his bachelor’s degree from Delhi University and a Master’s Degree in Public Relations and Strategic Communication from Leeds Beckett University in the United Kingdom.

== Political career ==
Since 2017, Singh has been a member of the Uttar Pradesh Legislative Assembly 2017 for the Atrauli Assembly constituency. He was appointed Minister of State (Independent Charge) of Basic, Secondary, Higher, Technical, and Medical education.

Between 2020 and 2022, he served as Minister of State for Finance, Technical and Medical Education.

He was re-elected in the 2022 legislative elections. Beginning in 2022, Singh served in the Ministry of Basic Education.

== See also ==
- First Yogi Adityanath ministry
