= List of members of the 4th Lok Sabha =

Members of Lok Sabha (1967-71)

This is a list of members of the 4th Lok Sabha arranged by state or territory represented. These members of the lower house of the Indian Parliament were elected to the 4th Lok Sabha (1967 to 1971) at the 1967 Indian general election.

== Andaman and Nicobar Islands ==
INC (1)

No.	Constituency	Member	Party
1	Andaman and Nicobar	K. R. Ganesh	Indian National Congress

== Andhra Pradesh ==
INC (35) SWA (3) CPI (1) PG (1) IND (1)

No.	Constituency	Member	Party
1	Adilabad	P. Ganga Reddy	Indian National Congress
2	Amalapuram (SC)	B. Suryanarayana Murthy	Indian National Congress
3	Anakapalli	M. Suryanarayana Murti	Indian National Congress
4	Anantapur	P. Antony Reddi	Indian National Congress
5	Bhadrachalam (ST)	B. Radhabai Ananda Rao	Indian National Congress
6	Bobbili	K. Narayana Rao	Indian National Congress
7	Chittoor	N. P. C. Naidu	Indian National Congress
8	Cuddapah	Y. Eswara Reddy	Communist Party of India
9	Eluru	Kommareddi Suryanarayana	Indian National Congress
10	Gudivada	Maganti Ankineedu	Indian National Congress
11	Guntur	Kotha Raghuramayya	Indian National Congress
12	Hindupur	Dr. Neelam Sanjiva Reddy	Indian National Congress
13	Hyderabad	Dr. Gopal S. Melkote	Indian National Congress
14	Kakinada	Mosalikanti Thirumala Rao	Indian National Congress
15	Karimnagar	J. Ramapathy Rao	Indian National Congress
16	Kavali	R. Dasaratharama Reddy	Indian National Congress
17	Khammam	Lakshmi Kantamma	Indian National Congress
18	Kurnool	Y. Gadilingana Goud	Swatantra Party
19	Machilipatnam	Y. Ankeenidu Prasad	Indian National Congress
20	Mahbubnagar	J. Rameshwar Rao	Indian National Congress
21	Medak	Sangam Laxmi Bai	Indian National Congress
22	Miryalguda	G. S. Reddi	Indian National Congress
23	Nagarkurnool (SC)	J.B. Muthyal Rao	Indian National Congress
24	Nalgonda	Mohammad Yunus Saleem	Indian National Congress
25	Nandyal	Pendekanti Venkatasubbayya	Indian National Congress
26	Narasapur	D. Balarama Raju	Indian National Congress
27	Narasaraopet	M. Sudarsanam	Indian National Congress
28	Nellore (SC)	B. Anjanappa	Indian National Congress
29	Nizamabad	M. Narayana Reddy	Independent
30	Ongole	K. Jagayya	Indian National Congress
31	Parvathipuram (ST)	Viswasarai Narasimha Rao	Swatantra Party
32	Peddapalli (SC)	M. R. Krishna	Indian National Congress
33	Rajahmundry (ST)	Dr. D. Satyanarayana Raju	Indian National Congress
34	Rajampet	Pothuraju Parthasarthy	Indian National Congress
35	Secunderabad	Bakar Ali Mirza	Indian National Congress
36	Siddipet (SC)	Gaddam Venkataswamy	Indian National Congress
37	Srikakulam	Gouthu Latchanna	Swatantra Party
38	Tirupathi (SC)	C. Das	Indian National Congress
39	Vijayawada	Dr. K. Lakshmana Rao	Indian National Congress
40	Visakhapatnam	Tenneti Viswanadham	Progressive Group
41	Warangal	Surendra Reddy	Indian National Congress

== Assam ==
INC (10) PSP (2) HLC (1) CPI (1)

No.	Constituency	Member	Party
1	Autonomus Districts (ST)	George Gilbert Swell	Hill Leaders Conference
2	Barpeta	Fakhruddin Ali Ahmed	Indian National Congress
3	Cachar	Jyotsna Chanda	Indian National Congress
4	Dhubri	Jahan Uddin Ahmed	Praja Socialist Party
5	Dibrugarh	Jogendra Nath Hazarika	Indian National Congress
6	Gauhati	Dhireswar Kalita	Communist Party of India
7	Jorhat	Rajendranath Barua	Indian National Congress
8	Kaliabor	Bedabrata Barua	Indian National Congress
9	Karimganj (SC)	Nihar Ranjan Laskar	Indian National Congress
10	Kokrajhar (ST)	Dharanidhor Basumatari	Indian National Congress
10	Kokrajhar (ST)	Rupnath Brahma	Indian National Congress
11	Lakhimpur	Biswanarayan Shastri	Indian National Congress
12	Mangaldai	Hem Barua	Praja Socialist Party
13	Nowgong	Liladhar Kotoki	Indian National Congress
14	Tezpur	Bijoy Chandra Bhagavati	Indian National Congress

== Bihar ==
Constituency	Member	Party
Araria (SC)	T. Mohan Ram	Indian National Congress
Arrah	Bali Ram Bhagat	Indian National Congress (I)
Aurangabad	Mudrika Sinha	Indian National Congress
Bagaha (SC)	Bhola Raut	Indian National Congress (I)
Banka	Beni Shanker Sharma	Bharatiya Jan Sangh
Barh	Tarkeshwari Sinha	Indian National Congress
Begusarai	Yogendra Sharma	Communist Party of India
Bettiah	Kamal Nath Tewari	Indian National Congress
Bhagalpur	Bhagwat Jha Azad	Indian National Congress (I)
Bikramganj	Shiopujan Shastri	Indian National Congress
Buxar	Dr. Ram Subhag Singh	Indian National Congress
Chapra	Ramshekhar Prasad Singh	Indian National Congress
Chatra	Smt. Vijaya Raje	Independent
Darbhanga	Satya Narayan Sinha	Indian National Congress
Dhanbad	Rani Lalita Rajya Laxmi	Independent
Dumka (ST)	Satya Chandra Besra	Indian National Congress
Gaya (SC)	Ram Dhani Das	Indian National Congress
Giridih	Dr. Imteyaz Ahmad	Indian National Congress
Godda	Prabhu Dayal Himatsingka	Indian National Congress
Gopalganj	Dwarka Nath Tiwary	Congress
Hajipur (SC)	Valmiki Choudhary	Indian National Congress
Hazaribagh	Dr. Basant Narain Singh	IND
Hazaribagh	M.S. Oberoi	Jharkhand Party
Jamshedpur	Shiva Chandika Prasad	Indian National Congress
Jamui (SC)	Narayan Das (politician)	Indian National Congress
Katihar	Sitaram Kesri	Indian National Congress
Khagaria	Kameshwar Prasad Singh	Samyukta Socialist Party
Khunti (ST)	Niral Enem Horo	Independent
Khunti (ST)	Jaipal Singh	Indian National Congress
Lohardaga (ST)	Kartik Oraon	Indian National Congress (I)
Madhepura	Bindhyeshwari Prasad Mandal	
Madhubani	Bhogendra Jha	Communist Party of India
Madhubani	Shiva Chandra Jha	Samyukta Socialist Party
Maharajganj	Chandra Shekhar Singh	
Motihari	Kamla Mishra Madhukar	Communist Party of India
Motihari	Bibhuti Mishra	Indian National Congress
Munger (Monghyr)	Madhu Limaye	Socialist Party
Muzaffarpur	D N Singh	Congress
Nalanda	Prof. Siddheshwar Prasad	Indian National Congress
Nawada (SC)	Dr. Surya Prakash Puri	Independent
Palamau (SC)	Kumari Kamla Kumari	Indian National Congress (I)
Patna	Ramavatar Shastri	Communist Party of India
Pupri	Shashi Ranjan Prasad Sah	Indian National Congress
Purnea	Lakhan Lal Kapoor	
Purnea	Phani Gopal Sen Gupta	Indian National Congress
Rajmahal (ST)	Iswar Marandi	Indian National Congress
Ranchi	Prashant Kumar Ghosh	Indian National Congress
Rosera (SC)	Kedar Paswan	Samyukta Socialist Party
Saharsa	Gunanand Thakur	Samyukta Socialist Party
Samastipur	Yamuna Prasad Mandal	Indian National Congress
Sasaram (SC)	Jagjivan Ram	Indian National Congress
Singhbhum (ST)	Kolai Birua	Jharkhand Party
Sitamarhi	Nagendra Prasad Yadav	Indian National Congress
Siwan	Mohammad Yusuf	Indian National Congress

== Chandigarh ==
BJS (1)

No.	Constituency	Member	Party
1	Chandigarh	Srichand Goyal	Bharatiya Jana Sangh

== Dadra and Nagar Haveli ==
INC (1)

No.	Constituency	Member	Party
1	Dadra and Nagar Haveli (ST)	Sanjibhai Rupjibhai Delkar	Indian National Congress

== Delhi ==
BJS (6) INC (1)

No.	Constituency	Member	Party
1	Chandni Chowk	Ram Gopal Shawlwale	Bharatiya Jana Sangh
2	Delhi Sadar	Kanwar Lal Gupta	Bharatiya Jana Sangh
3	East Delhi	Hardayal Devgun	Bharatiya Jana Sangh
4	Karol Bagh (SC)	R. S. Vidyarthi	Bharatiya Jana Sangh
5	New Delhi	Manohar Lal Sondhi	Bharatiya Jana Sangh
6	Outer Delhi (SC)	Brahm Prakash	Indian National Congress
7	South Delhi	Balraj Madhok	Bharatiya Jana Sangh

== Goa, Daman and Diu ==
UGS (2)

No.	Constituency	Member	Party
1	Marmagoa	Erasmo de Sequeira	United Goans Party - Seqveria Group
2	Panjim	Janardan Jagannath Shinkre	Independent

== Gujarat ==
Constituency	Member	Party
Ahmedabad	Indulal Kanaiyalal Yagnik	Indian National Congress
Amreli	Dr. Jivraj Narayan Mehta	Indian National Congress
Amreli	Jayaben Shah	Indian National Congress
Anand	Narendrasingh Ranjitsingh Mahida	Indian National Congress
Anand	Pravinsinh Natavarsinh Solanki	Indian National Congress (Organisation)
Banaskantha	Manubhai N. Amersey	Swatantra Party
Banaskantha	S. K. Patil	Indian National Congress
Baroda	Pashabhai Patel	Swatantra Party
Bhavnagar	Prasannbhai Mehta	
Broach	Mansinhji Bhasaheb Rana	Indian National Congress
Bulsar (ST)	Nanubhai Nichhabhai Patel	
Dabhoi	Manubhai M. Patel	Indian National Congress
Dohad (ST)	Bhaljibhai Ravjibhai Parmar	Indian National Congress (Organisation)
Gandhinagar	Somchandbhai Manubhai Solanki	Indian National Congress (Organisation)
Godhra	Piloo Homi Mody	Swatantra Party
Jamnagar	N. Dandekar	Swatantra Party
Junagadh	Viren Shah	Swatantra Party
Kutch	Tulsidas M. Sheth	Indian National Congress
Mandvi (ST)	Chhaganbhai Madaribhai Kedaria	Indian National Congress
Mehsana	Ramchandra Amin	Swatantra Party
Patan (SC)	Dahyabhai Parmar	Swatantra Party
Rajkot	M.R. Masani	Swatantra Party
Sabarkantha	Chandulal Chunnilal Desai	Indian National Congress (Organisation)
Surat	Morarji Desai	Congress
Surendranagar	Maharaja Sriraj Meghrajji Dhrangadhra	Independent
Surendranagar	Prof. Ramdas Kishordas Amin	

== Haryana ==
Constituency	Member	Party
Ambala (SC)	Suraj Bhan	Bharatiya Jana Sangh
Gurgaon	Abdul Ghani Dar	Independent
Hissar	Ram Krishan Gupta	Indian National Congress
Kaithal	Gulzarilal Nanda	Indian National Congress
Karnal	Madho Ram Sharma	Indian National Congress
Mahendragarh	Gajraj Singh Rao	Indian National Congress
Rohtak	Chaudhari Randhir Singh	Indian National Congress
Sirsa (SC)	Dalbir Singh	Indian National Congress

== Himachal Pradesh ==
INC (6)

No.	Constituency	Member	Party
1	Chamba	Vikram Chand Mahajan	Indian National Congress
2	Hamirpur	Prem Chand Verma	Indian National Congress
3	Kangra	Hem Raj	Indian National Congress
4	Mahasu	V. Singh	Indian National Congress
5	Mandi	Lalit Sen	Indian National Congress
6	Shimla (SC)	Pratap Singh	Indian National Congress

== Jammu and Kashmir ==
INC (5) JKNC (1)

No.	Constituency	Member	Party
1	Anantnag	Mohammad Shafi Qureshi	Indian National Congress
2	Baramullah	Syed Ahmed Aga	Indian National Congress
3	Jammu	Inder Jit Malhotra	Indian National Congress
4	Ladakh	Kushok G. Bakula	Indian National Congress
5	Srinagar	Ghulam Mohamad Bakshi	Jammu and Kashmir National Conference
6	Udhampur	G.S. Brigadier	Indian National Congress
6	Udhampur	Dr. Karan Singh	Indian National Congress

== Karnataka ==
Constituency	Member	Party
Bagalkot	Sanganagouda Basanagouda Patil	Indian National Congress
Bidar (SC)	Ramchandra Veerappa	Congress
Bijapur	Basagondappa Kadappa Gudadinni	Indian National Congress (I)
Chikballapur	M. V. Krishnappa	Indian National Congress
Chikkodi (SC)	B. Shankaranand	Indian National Congress (I)
Dharwad North	Dr. Sarojini Bindurao Mahishi	Indian National Congress
Dharwad South	Fakruddin Husseinsad Mohsin	Indian National Congress (I)
Kolar (SC)	G.Y. Krishnan	Indian National Congress (I)
Mandya	S. M. Krishna	Indian National Congress (I)
Mysore	M. Tulsidas Dasappa	Indian National Congress
Tumkur	K. Lakkappa	Indian National Congress (I)

== Kerala ==
Constituency	Member	Party
Adoor (SC)	P.C. Adichan	Communist Party of India
Badagara	Arangil Sreedharan	Samyukta Socialist Party
Chirayinkil	K. Anirudhan	Communist Party of India (Marxist)
Ambalapuzha	Suseela Gopalan	Communist Party of India (Marxist)
Ernakulam	V. Viswanatha Menon	Communist Party of India (Marxist)
Kottayam	K.M. Abraham	Communist Party of India (Marxist)
Manjeri	M. Muhammad Ismail	Indian Union Muslim League
Mavelikara	G.P. Mangalathumadom	Samyukta Socialist Party
Mukundapuram	A.C. George	Indian National Congress
Mukundapuram	Panampilli Govinda Menon	Indian National Congress
Muvattupuzha	P.P. Esthose	Communist Party of India (Marxist)
Palghat	E.K. Nayanar	Communist Party of India (Marxist)
Kasaragod	A. K. Gopalan	Communist Party of India (Marxist)
Ponnani	C.K. Chakrapani	Communist Party of India (Marxist)
Kozhikode	Ebrahim Sulaiman Sait	Indian Union Muslim League
Quilon	N. Sreekantan Nair	Revolutionary Socialist Party
Tellicherry	Pattiam Gopalan	Communist Party of India (Marxist)
Trichur	C. Janardhanan	Communist Party of India
Trivandrum	P. Viswambharan	Samyukta Socialist Party
Peermade	P. K. Vasudevan Nair	Communist Party of India

== Lakshadweep ==
INC (1)

No.	Constituency	Member	Party
1	Lakshadweep (ST)	P. M. Sayeed	Indian National Congress

== Madhya Pradesh ==
Constituency	Member	Party
Balaghat	Chintaman Rao Gautam	Indian National Congress
Bastar (ST)	Jhadoo Ram Sundar Lal	Independent
Betul	Narendra Kumar P. Salve	Indian National Congress
Bhind	Yashwant Singh Kushwah	Independent
Bilaspur (SC)	Sardar Amar Singh Saigal	Indian National Congress
Damoh	Manibhai J. Patel	Indian National Congress
Dhar (ST)	Bharat Singh Chowhan	
Durg	Chandulal Chandrakar	Indian National Congress (I)
Durg	V.Y. Tamaskar	Indian National Congress
Guna	Vijaya Raje Scindia (Resigned in 1967, joined Jana Sangh, elected as MLA)	Swatantra Party
Guna	J. B. Kripalani (1967 bypoll)	Independent / Swatantra Party
Gwalior	Ram Awtar Sharma	Independent
Hoshangabad	Chaudhary Nitiraj Singh	Indian National Congress
Indore	Prakash Chand Sethi	Indian National Congress (I)
Jabalpur	Seth Govind Das	Indian National Congress
Janjgir	Smt. Minimata Agam Dass Guru	Indian National Congress
Jhabua (ST)	Sur Singh	Indian National Congress
Kanker (ST)	Trilokshah Lal Priendra Shah	Bharatiya Jan Sangh
Khandwa	Gangacharan Dixit	Indian National Congress
Mandla (ST)	Mangru Ganu Uikey	Indian National Congress
Mandsaur	Swatantra Singh Kothari	Bharatiya Jan Sangh
Morena (SC)	Atamdas	Independent
Raigarh (ST)	Smt. Rajni Gandha	Indian National Congress
Raipur	Lakhan Lal Gupta	Indian National Congress
Raipur	Vidya Charan Shukla	Indian National Congress (I)
Rajnandgaon	Smt. Padmawati Devi	Indian National Congress
Rewa	S.N. Shukla	Indian National Congress
Sagar (SC)	Ram Singh Ayarwal	Bharatiya Jan Sangh
Satna	Devendra Vijai Singh	Indian National Congress
Seoni	Gargi Shankar Mishra	Indian National Congress (I)
Shahdol (ST)	Smt. Girja Kumari	Indian National Congress
Shajapur (SC)	Dr. Baburao Patel	Independent
Shajapur (SC)	Jagannath Rao Joshi	Bharatiya Jan Sangh
Sidhi (ST)	Maharaja Bhanu Prakash Singh (Narsinghgarh)	Indian National Congress
Surguja (ST)	Babu Nath Singh	Indian National Congress
Tikamgarh (SC)	Nathu Ram Ahirwar	Indian National Congress
Ujjain (SC)	Hukam Chand Kachwai	Jana Sangh
Vidisha	Pandit Shiv Sharma	Independent

== Madras State ==
Constituency	Member	Party
Coimbatore	K. Ramani	Communist Party of India (Marxist)
Cuddalore	V. Krishnamoorthi Gounder	Dravida Munnetra Kazhagam
Dindigul	N. Anbuchezhian	Dravida Munnetra Kazhagam
Gobichettipalayam	P.A. Saminathan	Dravida Munnetra Kazhagam
Karur	C. Muthuswamy Gounder	Swatantra Party
Krishnagiri	M. Kamalanathan	Dravida Munnetra Kazhagam
Madras South	C. N. Annadurai	Dravida Munnetra Kazhagam
Madurai	P. Ramamurti	Communist Party of India (Marxist)
Mettur	Subbanarayan Kandappan	Dravida Munnetra Kazhagam
Nagapattinam (SC)	V. Sambasivam	Indian National Congress
Nagercoil	A. Nesamony	Indian National Congress
Nilgiris	M.K. Nanja Gowder	Swatantra Party
Periyakulam	H. Ajamal Khan	Swatantra Party
Pudukkottai	R. Umanath	Communist Party of India (Marxist)
Salem	K. Rajaram	Dravida Munnetra Kazhagam
Sivakasi	S.P. Ramamoorthy	Swatantra Party
Sriperumbudur (SC)	P. Sivasankaran	Dravida Munnetra Kazhagam
Tenkasi (SC)	R.S. Arumugam	Indian National Congress
Tindivanam	T.D.Ramabadran Naidu	Dravida Munnetra Kazhagam
Tiruchendur	Dr. M. Santosham	Swatantra Party
Tiruchengode	K. Anbazhagan	Dravida Munnetra Kazhagam
Tiruchirapalli	K. Ananda Nambiar	Communist Party of India (Marxist)
Tirunelveli	S. Xavier	Swatantra Party
Tiruppattur	R. Muthu Goundar	Dravida Munnetra Kazhagam
Tiruthani	S.K. Sambandhan	Dravida Munnetra Kazhagam
Vellore	G. Kuchelar	Dravida Munnetra Kazhagam

== Maharashtra ==
Constituency	Member	Party
Ahmednagar	Annasaheb Pandurange Shinde	Indian National Congress
Akola	K.M. Asghar Husain	Indian National Congress
Amravati	Krishnarao Gulabrao Deshmukh	Indian National Congress
Aurangabad	Bhaurao Dagdurao Deshmukh	Indian National Congress
Baramati	Raghunath Keshav Khadilkar	Indian National Congress
Baramati	Tulshidas Subhanrao Jadhav	Indian National Congress
Bhandara	Asoka Mehta	Indian National Congress
Bhir	Nana Ramchandra Patil	Communist Party of India
Bhiwandi	Sonubhau Dagadu Baswant	Indian National Congress
Bombay Central	R.D. Bhandare	Indian National Congress
Bombay South Central	S.A. Dange	Communist Party of India
Bombay South	George Fernandes	Socialist Party
Bombay North East	Sadashiv Govind Barve (Died in 1967)	Indian National Congress
Bombay North East	Tara Govind Sapre, Barve's sister, in bypoll after Barve's death	Indian National Congress
Bombay North West	Shantilal Shah	Indian National Congress
Buldhana (SC)	Shivram Rango Rane	Indian National Congress
Chanda	K.M. Koushik	Swatantra Party
Chimur	Ramchandra Matand Hajarnavis	Indian National Congress
Dahanu (ST)	Raja Yeshwantrao Mukne	Indian National Congress
Dhulia	Chudaman Ananda Rawandale Patil	Indian National Congress
Hatkanangale	Maharani Vijayamala Rajaram Chhatrapati Bhonsle	Peasants and Workers Party of India
Jalgaon	S.S. Samadali	Indian National Congress
Jalgaon	Yadav Shivram Mahajan	Indian National Congress (I)
Jalna	V.N. Jadhav	Indian National Congress
Karad	Dajisaheb Chavan	Indian National Congress
Khamgaon (SC)	Arjun Shripat Kasture	Indian National Congress
Khed	Anantrao Patil	Indian National Congress
Kolaba	Dattatraya Kashninath Kunte	Independent
Kolhapur	Shankararo Dattatraya Mane	Indian National Congress
Latur	Tulsiram Dashrath Kamble	Indian National Congress
Malegaon (ST)	Zambru Mangalu Kahandole	Indian National Congress
Nagpur	Narendra Ramchandraji Deoghare	Indian National Congress
Nanded	Venkatarao Babarao Tarodekar	Indian National Congress
Nandurbar (ST)	Tukaram Huraji Gavit	Indian National Congress
Nashik	Bhanudas Ramchandra Kavade	Indian National Congress
Osmanabad (SC)	Tulsiram Abaji Patil	Indian National Congress
Pandharpur (SC)	Tayappa Hari Sonavane	Indian National Congress
Parbhani	Shivajirao Shankarrao Deshmukh	Indian National Congress
Poona	S.M. Joshi	Samyukta Socialist Party
Rajapur	Nath Pai	Praja Socialist Party
Ramtek	Dr. Amrut Ganpat Sonar	Indian National Congress
Ratnagiri	Sharda Mukerjee	Indian National Congress
Sangli	Sadashiv Daji Patil	Indian National Congress
Satara	Yashwantrao Balwantrao Chavan	Indian National Congress
Solapur	Surajratan Fatehchand Damani	Indian National Congress
Wardha	Kamalnayan Jamnalal Bajaj	Indian National Congress
Yavatmal	Deorao Shioram Patil	Indian National Congress

== Manipur ==
CPI (1) IND (1)

No.	Constituency	Member	Party
1	Inner Manipur	M. Meghachandra	Communist Party of India
2	Outer Manipur (ST)	Paokai Haokip	Independent

== Mysore State ==
Constituency	Member	Party
Bangalore City	K. Hanumanthaiya	Indian National Congress
Belgaum	M.N. Naghnoor	Indian National Congress
Bellary	Dr. V.K.R. Varadaraja Rao	Indian National Congress
Bijapur	G.D. Patil	Swatantra Party
Chamarajanagar (SC)	S.M. Siddayya	Indian National Congress
Chikmagalur	M. Huche Gowda	Praja Socialist Party
Chitradurga	J. Mohamed Imam	Swatantra Party
Gulbarga	Mahadevappa Rampure	Indian National Congress
Hassan	Nuggehalli Shivappa	Indian National Congress
Kanakapura	M. V. Rajasekharan	Indian National Congress
Kanara	Dinker Desai	Independent
Koppal	Sangappa A. Agadi	Indian National Congress
Madhugiri	Mali Mariyappa	Indian National Congress
Madhugiri	Sudha V. Reddy	Indian National Congress
Mangalore	C. M. Poonacha	Indian National Congress
Raichur	Raja Venkatappa Naik	Swatantra Party
Shimoga	J. H. Patel	Samyukta Socialist Party
Udupi	J.M. Lobo Prabhu	Swatantra Party

== Nagaland ==
Constituency	Member	Party
Nagaland	S. C. Jamir	Indian National Congress

== Orissa ==
SWAP (10) INC (5) PSP (4) SSP (1)

Sl. No.	Constituency	Member	Colour	Party
1	Anugol	D. N. Deb		Swatantra Party
2	Baleswar	Samarendra Kundu		Praja Socialist Party
3	Chhatrapur	R. Jagannatha Rao		Indian National Congress
4	Bhadrak (SC)	Dharanidhar Jena		Swatantra Party
5	Bhanjanagar	Ananta Tripathi Sarma		Indian National Congress
6	Bhubaneswar	Chintamani Panigrahi		Indian National Congress
7	Bolangir	Raj Raj Singh Deo		Swatantra Party
8	Cuttack	Srinibas Mishra		Praja Socialist Party
9	Dhenkanal	Kamakhya Prasad Singh Deo		Swatantra Party
10	Jajapur (SC)	Baidhar Behera		Praja Socialist Party
11	Kalahandi	Pratap Keshari Deo		Independent politician
12	Kendrapara	Surendranath Dwibedi		Praja Socialist Party
13	Puri	Rabi Ray		Samyukta Socialist Party
14	Keonjhar (ST)	Gurucharan Naik		Swatantra Party
15	Koraput (ST)	Ramachandra Ulaka		Indian National Congress
16	Mayurbhanj (ST)	Mahendra Majhi		Swatantra Party
17	Nabarangapur (ST)	N. Majhi		Swatantra Party
18	Phulbani (SC)	Aniruddha Dipa		Swatantra Party
19	Sambalpur	Shraddhakar Supakar		Indian National Congress
20	Sundergarh (ST)	Debananda Amat		Swatantra Party

== Pudducherry ==
INC (1)

No.	Constituency	Member	Party
1	Pondicherry	Thirumudi N. Sethuraman	Indian National Congress

== Punjab ==
Constituency	Member	Party
Bhatinda (SC)	Kikar Singh	Akali Dal – Sant Fateh Singh
Fazilka	Sardar Iqbal Singh	Indian National Congress
Ferozepur	Dr. Gurdial Singh Dhillon	Indian National Congress (I)
Ferozepur	Sohan Singh Basi	Akali Dal
Gurdaspur	Diwan Chand Sharma	Indian National Congress
Gurdaspur	Prabodh Chandra	Indian National Congress
Hoshiarpur	Jai Singh	Bharatiya Jan Sangh
Hoshiarpur	Ram Kishan Gupta	Indian National Congress
Jullundur	Sardar Swaran Singh	Indian National Congress
Ludhiana	Devinder Singh Garcha	Indian National Congress (I)
Patiala	Smt. Mohinder Kaur	Indian National Congress
Phillaur (SC)	Chaudhary Sadhu Ram	Indian National Congress
Sangrur	Gurcharan Singh Nihalsinghwala	Indian National Congress (I)
Sangrur	Sardarni Nirlep Kaur	Akali Dal – Sant Fateh Singh

== Rajasthan ==
Constituency	Member	Party
Ajmer	Bashweshwar Nath Bhargava	Indian National Congress
Alwar	Bholanath Master	Indian National Congress
Alwar	Nawal Kishore Sharma	Indian National Congress
Banswara (ST)	Heerji Bhai	Indian National Congress
Bayana (SC)	Jagannath Pahadia	Indian National Congress (I)
Bharatpur	Maharaja Brijendra Singh	Independent
Bhilwara	Ramesh Chandra Vyas	Indian National Congress
Bikaner	Karni Singh	Independent
Chittorgarh	Onkarlal Bohra	Indian National Congress
Dausa	Charanjit Rai	Swatantra Party
Ganganagar (SC)	Pannalal Barupal	Indian National Congress
Jaipur	Gayatri Devi	Swatantra Party
Jalore (SC)	D.N. Patodia	Swatantra Party
Jhalawar	Brijraj Singh	Bharatiya Jan Sangh
Jhunjhunu	R.K. Birla	Swatantra Party
Kota	Onkarlal Berwa	Bharatiya Jan Sangh
Nagaur	N.K. Somani	Swatantra Party
Pali	Surendra Kumar Tapuriah	Swatantra Party
Sawai Madhopur (ST)	Meetha Lal Meena	Swatantra Party
Sikar	Saboo Gopal	Bharatiya Jan Sangh
Tonk (SC)	Jamna Lal Barwa	Swatantra Party
Udaipur	Dhuleshwar Meena	Indian National Congress

== Tamil Nadu ==
Constituency	Member	Party
Chengleput	C. Chitti Babu	Dravida Munnetra Kazhagam
Chennai Central	Murasoli Maran	Dravida Munnetra Kazhagam
Chidambaram (SC)	V. Mayavan	Dravida Munnetra Kazhagam
Kallakurichi	M. Deiveekan	Dravida Munnetra Kazhagam
Kumbakonam	Era Sezhiyan	Dravida Munnetra Kazhagam
Madras North	Krishnan Manoharan	Dravida Munnetra Kazhagam
Mayuram (SC)	K. Subravelu	Dravida Munnetra Kazhagam
Nagercoil	K. Kamaraj Nadar	Indian National Congress (Organisation)
Perambalur (SC)	A. Durairasu	Dravida Munnetra Kazhagam
Periyakulam	S.M. Muhammed Sheriff	Indian Union Muslim League
Pollachi (SC)	B. Narayanan	Dravida Munnetra Kazhagam
Pollachi (SC)	C.T. Dhandapani	Dravida Munnetra Kazhagam
Sivaganga	T. Kiruttinan	Dravida Munnetra Kazhagam
Thanjavur	S.D. Somasundaram	All India Anna Dravida Munnetra Kazhagam
Wandiwash	G. Viswanathan	Dravida Munnetra Kazhagam

== Tripura ==
INC (2)

No.	Constituency	Member	Party
1	Tripura East (ST)	Maharaja Manikya Kirit Bikram Kishore Deb Burman	Indian National Congress (I)
2	Tripura West	J. K. Choudhury	Indian National Congress

== Uttar Pradesh ==
Constituency	Member	Party
Agra	Seth Achal Singh	Indian National Congress
Akbarpur (SC)	Ramji Ram	Indian National Congress
Aligarh	Shiv Kumar Shastri	Bharatiya Kranti Dal
Allahabad	Hari Krishna	Indian National Congress
Almora	Jang Bahadur Singh Bisht	Indian National Congress
Amethi	Vidya Dhar Bajpai	Indian National Congress
Amroha	Maulana Ishaq Sambhali	Communist Party of India
Aonla	Smt. Savitri Shyam	Indian National Congress
Azamgarh	Chandrajit Yadav	Congress
Baghpat	Raghuvir Singh Shastri	Independent
Bahraich	K.K. Nayar	Bharatiya Jan Sangh
Ballia	Chandrika Prasad	Indian National Congress
Balrampur	Atal Bihari Vajpayee (A Behari Bajpai)	Bharatiya Jana Sangh
Banda	Jageshwar Yadav	Communist Party of India
Bansgaon (SC)	Molhu Prasad	Samyukta Socialist Party
Barabanki (SC)	Ram Sewak Yadav	Samyukta Socialist Party
Bareilly	Brij Bhushan Lal	Bharatiya Jan Sangh
Basti (SC)	Sheo Narain	Congress
Bijnor (SC)	Swami Ramanand Shastri	Indian National Congress
Bilhaur	Sushila Rohatgi	Indian National Congress
Budaun (Badaun)	J.S. Onkar Singh	Jana Sangh
Bulandshahar	Surendra Pal Singh	Indian National Congress (I)
Chail (SC)	Masuriya Din	Indian National Congress
Chandauli	Nihal Singh	
Deoria	Bishwanath Roy	Indian National Congress
Domariaganj	Narayan Swaroop Sharma	Bharatiya Jan Sangh
Etah	Malik Mohd. Mushir Ahmad Khan	Indian National Congress (I)
Etah	Rohanlal Chaturvedi	Indian National Congress
Etawah	Arjun Singh Bhadoria	Socialist Part in 1967, Janata Party after 1977
Faizabad	Ram Krishna Sinha	Indian National Congress
Farrukhabad	Awadhesh Chandra Singh Rathore	Indian National Congress
Fatehpur	Sant Bux Singh	Indian National Congress
Firozabad (SC)	Shiv Charan Lal	Samyukta Socialist Party
Garhwal	Bhakt Darshan	Indian National Congress
Ghatampur (SC)	Tula Ram	Indian National Congress
Ghazipur	Sarjoo Pandey	Communist Party of India
Ghosi	Jai Bahadur Singh	Communist Party of India
Ghosi	Jharkhande Rai	Communist Party of India
Gonda	Sucheta Kriplani	Indian National Congress
Gorakhpur	Mahant Digvijai Nath	Hindu Mahasabha
Gorakhpur	Mahant Avedyanath (1970 bypoll)	IND / (Hindu Maha Sabha and Jana Sangh support)
Hamirpur	Swami Brahmanand	Indian National Congress
Hapur	Kedar Nath Singh	Indian National Congress (I)
Hapur	Prakash Vir Shastri	Independent
Hardoi (SC)	Kinder Lal	Indian National Congress (I)
Hardwar (SC)	Sunder Lal	Indian National Congress (I)
Hathras (SC)	Nardeo Snatak	Indian National Congress
Jalaun (SC)	Chowdhary Ram Sewak	Indian National Congress
Jaunpur	Rajdeo Singh	Indian National Congress
Jhansi	Dr. Sushila Nayar	Congress
Kaiserganj	Shakuntala Nayar	Bharatiya Jan Sangh
Kannauj	Dr. Ram Manohar Lohia	Samyukta Socialist Party
Kannauj	S.N. Mishra	Indian National Congress
Kanpur	S. M. Banerjee	Independent
Khalilabad	Major Ranjeet Singh	Bharatiya Jan Sangh
Kheri	Balgovind Verma	Indian National Congress
Khurja (SC)	Ram Charan	Praja Socialist Party
Lalganj (SC)	Ram Dhan	
Lucknow	Anand Narain Mulla	Independent
Machhlishahr	Mishrapati	Indian National Congress (I)
Machhlishahr	Nageshwar Dwivedi	Indian National Congress
Maharajganj	Dr. Mahadeva Prasad	Indian National Congress
Mainpuri	Maharaj Singh	Indian National Congress
Mathura	Girraj Saran Singh	Independent
Mathura	Chaudhary Digambar Singh (1970 bypoll)	Kranti Dal
Meerut	Maharaj Singh Bharti	Samyukta Socialist Party
Mirzapur	Bansh Narain Singh	Bharatiya Jan Sangh
Misrikh (SC)	Dr. Sankta Prasad	Indian National Congress (I)
Mohanlalganj (SC)	Ganga Devi	Indian National Congress
Muzaffarnagar	Latafat Ali Khan	Communist Party of India
Padrauna	Kashi Nath Pandey	Indian National Congress
Phulpur	Vijaya Lakshmi Pandit	Indian National Congress
Phulpur	Janeshwar Mishra (1969 bypoll)	Samyukta Socialist Party
Pilibhit	Mohan Swarup	Indian National Congress
Pratapgarh	Dinesh Singh	Indian National Congress (I)
Rae Bareli	Indira Nehru Gandhi	Indian National Congress
Rampur	Zulfiquar Ali Khan	Indian National Congress (I)
Ramsanehighat (SC)	Baijnath Kureel	Indian National Congress
Robertsganj (SC)	Ram Swarup	Indian National Congress
Saharanpur	Yashpal Singh	Indian National Congress (I)
Saidpur (SC)	Shambhu Nath	Indian National Congress
Salempur	Vishwa Nath Pandey	Indian National Congress
Shahjahanpur	Prem Kishan Khanna	Indian National Congress
Shahabad	J.B. Singh	Jan Sangh
Sitapur	Sharda Nand	Bharatiya Jana Sangh
Sultanpur	Ganpat Sahai	Indian National Congress
Tehri Garhwal	Lt. Col.(Retd) Maharaja Manabendra Shah	Congress
Unnao	Krishna Dev Tripathi	Indian National Congress
Varanasi	Satya Narain Singh	Communist Party of India (Marxist)

== West Bengal ==
Constituency	Member	Party
Arambagh	Amiya Nath Bose	All India Forward Bloc
Asansol	Deven Sen	Samyukta Socialist Party
Ausgram (SC)	Bhagaban Das	Communist Party of India (Marxist)
Hoogly	Bijoy Krishna Modak	Communist Party of India (Marxist)
Balurghat (SC)	Jatindra Nath Pramanik	Indian National Congress
Bankura	J.M. Biswas	Communist Party of India
Barasat	Dr. Ranendra Nath Sen	Communist Party of India
Barrackpore	Mohammed Ismail	Communist Party of India (Marxist)
Basirhat	Humayun Kabir	Bangla Congress
Basirhat	Sardar Amjad Ali	United Interparliamentary Group
Berhampore	Tridib Chaudhuri	Revolutionary Socialist Party
Birbhum (SC)	Dr. Sisir kumar Saha	Indian National Congress
Bolpur	Anil Kumar Chanda	Indian National Congress
Burdwan	Nirmal Chandra Chatterjee	Independent
Calcutta North East	Hirendranath Mukherjee	Communist Party of India
Calcutta North West	Ashok Kumar Sen	Indian National Congress (I)
Calcutta South	Ganesh Ghosh	Communist Party of India (Marxist)
Contai	Prof. Samar Guha	Socialist Party
Cooch Behar (SC)	Benoy Krishna Daschowdhury	Indian National Congress
Darjeeling	Dr. Maitreyee Bose	Independent
Diamond Harbour	Jyotirmoy Bosu	Communist Party of India (Marxist)
Ghatal	Parimal Ghosh	Indian National Congress
Howrah	Krishna Kumar Chatterji	Indian National Congress
Jalpaiguri	Birendra Nath Katham	Indian National Congress
Jangipur	Haji Lutfal Haque	Indian National Congress
Jaynagar (SC)	Chitta Roy	United Interparliamentary Group
Jhargram (ST)	Prof. Amiya Kumar Kisku	Indian National Congress
Katwa	Dwaipayan Sen	Indian National Congress
Krishnagar	Hari Pada Chatterjee	Independent
Krishnagar	Ila Pal Choudhuri	Indian National Congress
Malda	Uma Roy	Indian National Congress
Mathurapur (SC)	Kansari Halder	Communist Party of India
Midnapore	Sachindra Nath Maiti	Bangla Congress
Midnapore	Indrajit Gupta	Communist Party of India
Murshidabad	Syed Badrudduja	Independent Democratic Party
Nabadwip (SC)	P.R. Thakur	Independent
Purulia	Bhajahari Mahato	Lok Sewak Sangha
Raiganj	C.K. Bhattacharyya	Indian National Congress
Serampore	Bimal Kanti Ghosh	Indian National Congress (I)
Tamluk	Satish Chandra Samanta	Bangla Congress
Uluberia	Jugal Mondal	Indian National Congress
Vishnupur (SC)	Dr. Pashupati Mandal	Indian National Congress

== Nominated ==
Constituency	Member	Party
North-East Frontier Agency	Daying Ering till 1970	Indian National Congress
North-East Frontier Agency	C. C. Gohain	Indian National Congress
Anglo-Indian reserved seats in the Lok Sabha	Frank Anthony	Independent
Anglo-Indian reserved seats in the Lok Sabha	A. E. T. Barrow	Independent
