= Mushir Ahmad Khan =

Indian politician

MP Mushir Ahmad Khan

Members of the 7th Lok Sabha
- In office 1980–1984
- President: Neelam Sanjiva Reddy; Giani Zail Singh
- Prime Minister: Indira Gandhi; Rajiv Gandhi
- Constituency: Etah

Members of the 4th Lok Sabha
- In office 1967–1971
- President: V. V. Giri
- Prime Minister: Indira Gandhi
- Constituency: Kasganj

Personal details
- Born: Uttar Pradesh, India
- Party: Indian National Congress
- Education: Matriculation

Malik Mohd. Mushir Ahmad Khan was an Indian politician and a member of Indian National Congress who served as a member of the 4th and 7th Lok Sabha. He represented Etah parliamentary constituency in 7th Lok Sabha, and Kasganj constituency in 4th Lok Sabha.

== Biography ==
He was born in 1924 to Malik Mohd. Shabbir Ahmad Khan in Etah district of India. He received his education at Government High School, Aligarh where he did his matriculation which was his highest education.

He served as a member of All India Congress Committee from 1968 to 1970 and district president of Congress Committee, in addition to serving as a chairman of Town Area Committee (1948-1953), Sahawar Town, Etah (1961–1966) and Zila Parishad for Etah (1965–1966). He also appointed as a director of Food Corporation of India (1971–1975), All India Handicrafts Board for four years, and director of Etah Co-operative Bank for three years.

He was later appointed as a member of National Railway Users Consultative Council for four years, Estimates Committee for one year, and a member of House Committee (1967–1970).

He was a part of Parliamentary Delegation to Indonesia, in addition to representing India in the Organisation of the Islamic Conference held in Bandung, Indonesia. He also travelled to Australia to study the bakery industry where he negotiated with the officials for aid.
