= Bishanchander Seth =

Indian politician

Member of Parliament, Lok Sabha
- In office 1957–1967
- Preceded by: Rohanlal Chaturvedi
- Succeeded by: Rohanlal Chaturvedi
- Constituency: Etah, Uttar Pradesh

Personal details
- Born: 29 January 1909 Shahjahanpur, United Provinces, British India, (present-day Uttar Pradesh, India)
- Party: Hindu Mahasabha
- Spouse: Tarawati

Bishanchander Seth was an Indian politician. He was elected to the Lok Sabha, the lower house of the Parliament of India as a member of the Hindu Mahasabha.
