= Ashish Kumar =

Ashish Kumar may refer to:

- Ashish Kumar (boxer) (born 1994), Indian amateur boxer
- Ashish Kumar (cricketer) (born 1988), Indian cricketer
- Ashish Kumar (gymnast) (born 1990), Indian gymnast
- Ashish Kumar Ballal (born 1970), Indian field hockey player
- Ashish Kumar Chauhan (born 1968), Indian business executive
- Ashish Kumar Louho (1937–1994), Bangladeshi actor
- Ashish Kumar Saha, Indian politician from Tripura
- Ashish Kumar Singh, Indian politician from Uttar Pradesh
- Ashish Kumar Yadav (born 1984), Indian politician
