= Mahadeepak Singh Shakya =

Indian politician (1922–2020)

Manadeepak Singh Shakya

Member of Parliament, Lok Sabha
- In office 1971–1977
- Constituency: Etah Lok Sabha constituency
- In office 1977–1979
- Constituency: Etah Lok Sabha constituency
- In office 1989–1991
- Constituency: Etah Lok Sabha constituency
- In office 1991–1996
- Constituency: Etah Lok Sabha constituency

Member of Parliament
- In office 1996–1997
- Constituency: Etah Lok Sabha constituency

Member of Parliament, Lok Sabha
- In office 1998–1999

Personal details
- Born: 12 January 1956 (age 70)
- Party: Bharatiya Janata Party
- Education: M.A. (Hindi), Ayurveda Ratna, Ayurvedacharya Educated at Jawaharlal Degree College, Etah (Uttar Pradesh) and Akhil Bharatiya Ayurveda Vidyapeeth, Delhi
- Occupation: Agriculturist, Medical Practitioner, Political and Social Worker, Sportsman

Mahadeepak Singh Shakya (25 July 1922 – 10 November 2020) was an Indian politician.

== Career ==
He was the most senior and prominent leader in Etah district and a member of Lok Sabha. He was elected to Lok Sabha for six terms from Etah in Uttar Pradesh state in India. He was a leader of Bharatiya Janata Party. He joined Congress Party in 2009, later rejoined BJP .
