= Bhagwan Sharma =

Indian politician

Member of the Uttar Pradesh Legislative Assembly
- In office March 2012 – March 2017
- Preceded by: Himself
- Succeeded by: Anita Lodhi
- Constituency: Debai

Member of the Uttar Pradesh Legislative Assembly
- In office May 2007 – March 2012
- Preceded by: Kalyan Singh
- Succeeded by: Himself
- Constituency: Debai

Personal details
- Born: 10 July 1974 (age 52) Gautam Budh Nagar district
- Party: Bahujan Samaj Party (2007-2012); Samajwadi Party (2012-2017); Shiv Sena (2022-Present)
- Spouse: Kajal Sharma
- Children: 1 son and 1 daughter
- Parent: Mishrilal Sharma (father)
- Education: Patel Higher Secondary
- Profession: Businessman & politician

Bhagwan Sharma also known as Guddu Pandit is an Indian politician and a member of the 15th and 16th Legislative Assembly of India. He represents the Debai constituency of Uttar Pradesh and was a member of the Samajwadi Party political party until 2017.

== Early life and education ==
Bhagwan Sharma was born in Gautam Budh Nagar district. He attended the Patel Higher Secondary School and is educated till tenth grade.

== Political career ==
Bhagwan Sharma has been a MLA for two terms. He represented the Debai constituency and is a member of the Samajwadi Party political party. During the 15th Vidhan Sabha, he was a member of the Bahujan Samaj Party. Sharma was expelled from the SP along with his brother Mukesh Sharma for defying the party whip by cross-voting in favor of a Bharatiya Janata Party nominee and attempted to contest with the BJP, but were denied tickets, after which, they joined the Rashtriya Lok Dal.

== Posts held ==
| # | From | To | Position | Comments |
|---|---|---|---|---|
| 01 | March 2012 | March 2017 | Member, 16th Legislative Assembly | |
| 02 | May 2007 | March 2012 | Member, 15th Legislative Assembly | |

== See also ==
- Debai (Assembly constituency)
- Sixteenth Legislative Assembly of Uttar Pradesh
- Uttar Pradesh Legislative Assembly
