= Manibhai J. Patel =

Indian politician

- Born: 6 December 1920; Nadiad, Kheda district, Gujarat, India
- Died: 12 June 1996 (aged 75); Mumbai, Maharashtra, India
- Occupations: Industrialist, politician, writer
- Known for: Member of Parliament; Member of the Legislative Assembly
- Awards: 1971 Padma Bhushan

Manibhai Jaberbhai Patel (1920-1996) was an Indian industrialist, writer, politician and a member of the 4th Lok Sabha. He represented the Damoh Lok Sabha constituency from 1967 and was a member of Madhya Pradesh Legislative Assembly for two terms, from 1957–62 and 1962–67. He was the author of a number of books which included Nehru Vani, Janata ke Jawahar, Shantidoot Shastriji, Shreemati Indira Gandhi, Panchayaten Aur Humara Dayitwa and Pagdandiyon ki Awaz. The Government of India awarded him the Padma Bhushan, the third highest Indian civilian award, in 1971.

== Biography ==
Manibhai Patel was born on 6 December 1920 at Nadiad in Kheda district of the Indian state of Gujarat to Jhaverbhai Bhulabhai Patel and Sonaben J Patel couple and married to Lilaben M. Patel. Choosing the career of a businessman, he was active in labor and business administration, too and was a member of such organizations as Madhya Pradesh Labour Advisory Committee, Small Scale Industries of Saugor and Madhya Pradesh Board of Industries and Mineral Resources. He was also a member of the Indian Standards Institution (present-day Bureau of Indian Standards) and was a part of the Government of India delegation visited abroad for finding market for Indian tobacco and tobacco products.

Politically, Patel was aligned to the Indian National Congress and successfully contested two elections to the Vidhan Sabha, representing Rehli constituency in 1957 and 1962 during which period he also served as the chairman of the Library Committee of the Assembly. In the general election of 1967, he contested to the Lok Sabha from Damoh Lok Sabha constituency and served as a member of parliament until 1971. He was also a member of the Madhya Pradesh Congress Committee and the All India Congress Committee.

Patel was the author of a number of books viz. Nehru Vani, Janata ke Jawahar, Shantidoot Shastriji, Shreemati Indira Gandhi, Panchayaten Aur Humara Dayitwa and Pagdandiyon ki Awaz. He died on 12 June 1996, at the age of 75, at Mumbai, Maharashtra.

== See also ==
- List of members of the 4th Lok Sabha
- Elections in Madhya Pradesh

Preceded by Sahodrabai Rai	Member of Parliament; 1967–1971	Succeeded by Varah Shanker Giri

Preceded by	Member of the Legislative Assembly; 1957–1967	Succeeded by
