= Etah Assembly constituency =

Constituency of the Uttar Pradesh legislative assembly in India

Etah
- Constituency No. 104 for the Uttar Pradesh Legislative Assembly

Constituency details
- Country: India
- Region: North India
- State: Uttar Pradesh
- District: Etah
- Total electors: 3,51,988 (2022)
- Reservation: None

Member of Legislative Assembly
- 18th Uttar Pradesh Legislative Assembly
- Incumbent Vipin Kumar David
- Party: Bhartiya Janta Party
- Elected year: 2022

Etah Assembly constituency (Hindi pronunciation: [eːʈaː]) is one of the 403 constituencies of the Uttar Pradesh Legislative Assembly, India. It is a part of the Etah district and one of the five assembly constituencies in the Etah Lok Sabha constituency. First election in this assembly constituency was held in 1952 after the "DPACO (1951)" (delimitation order) was passed in 1951. After the "Delimitation of Parliamentary and Assembly Constituencies Order" was passed in 2008, the constituency was assigned identification number 104.

== Wards / Areas ==
Extent of Etah Assembly constituency is KCs Etah, Sakit, Malawan, Etah MB & Sakit NP of Etah Tehsil.

== Members of the Legislative Assembly ==
#	Term	Name	Party	From	To	Days	Comments	Ref
01	01st Vidhan Sabha	Hoti Lal Das	Indian National Congress	Mar-1952	Mar-1957	1,849	Constituency was called "Etah South"	
02	02nd Vidhan Sabha	Ganga Prasad	Independent	Apr-1957	Mar-1962	1,800	-	
03	03rd Vidhan Sabha	Ganga Prasad	Akhil Bharatiya Hindu Mahasabha	Mar-1962	Mar-1967	1,828	-	
04	04th Vidhan Sabha	Ganga Prasad	Swatantra Party	Mar-1967	Apr-1968	402	-	
05	05th Vidhan Sabha	Ganga Prasad	Indian National Congress	Feb-1969	Mar-1974	1,832	-	
06	06th Vidhan Sabha	Ganga Prasad	Indian National Congress (Organisation)	Mar-1974	Apr-1977	1,153	-	
07	07th Vidhan Sabha	Ganga Prasad	Janata Party	Jun-1977	Feb-1980	969	-	
08	08th Vidhan Sabha	Kailash Chandra Yadav	Indian National Congress (I)	Jun-1980	Mar-1985	1,735	-	
09	09th Vidhan Sabha	Atar Singh Yadav	Lok Dal	Mar-1985	Nov-1989	1,725	-	
10	10th Vidhan Sabha	Atar Singh Yadav	Janata Dal	Dec-1989	Apr-1991	488	-	
11	11th Vidhan Sabha	Pitam Singh	Bharatiya Janata Party	Jun-1991	Dec-1992	533	-	
12	12th Vidhan Sabha	Pitam Singh	Bharatiya Janata Party	Dec-1993	Oct-1995	693	-	
13	13th Vidhan Sabha	Shishu Pal Singh Yadav	Samajwadi Party	Oct-1996	May-2002	1,967	-	
14	14th Vidhan Sabha	Shishu Pal Singh Yadav	Samajwadi Party	Feb-2002	May-2007	1,902	-	
15	15th Vidhan Sabha	Prajapalan	Bharatiya Janata Party	May-2007	Mar-2012	1,762	-	
16	16th Vidhan Sabha	Ashish Kumar Yadav	Samajwadi Party	Mar-2012	Mar-2017	-	-	
17	17th Vidhan Sabha	Vipin Kumar David	Bhartiya Janata Party	Mar-2017	Mar-2022	-	-	

== Election results ==
=== 2027 ===
2027 Uttar Pradesh Legislative Assembly election: Etah
Party	Candidate	Votes	%	±%
INDIA				
NDA				
BSP				
NOTA	None of the above			
Majority				
Turnout				
gain from		Swing		

=== 2022 ===
2022 Uttar Pradesh Legislative Assembly election: Etah
Party	Candidate	Votes	%	±%
BJP	Vipin Kumar David	97,539	46.34	+5.42
SP	Jugendra Singh Yadav	80,292	38.15	+7.71
BSP	Ajay Singh	26,871	12.77	−8.03
NOTA	None of the above	779	0.37	−0.27
Majority		17,247	8.19	−2.29
Turnout		210,489	62.35	−1.21
BJP hold		Swing		

=== 2017 ===
2017 Uttar Pradesh Legislative Assembly election: Etah
Party	Candidate	Votes	%	±%
BJP	Vipin Kumar David	82,516	40.92	
SP	Jugendra Singh Yadav	61,387	30.44	
BSP	Gajendra Singh Chauhan	41,937	20.8	
LKD	Ashish Kumar Yadav	11,032	5.47	
NOTA	None of the above	1,277	0.64	
Majority		21,129	10.48	
Turnout		201,649	63.56	

=== 2012 ===
Sixteenth Legislative Assembly of Uttar Pradesh

2012 General Elections: Etah
Party	Candidate	Votes	%	±%
SP	Ashish Kumar Yadav	39,282	24.02	−
BSP	Gajendra Singh Chauhan	36,038	22.04	−
BJP	Prajapalan	32,857	20.09	−
	Remainder 16 candidates	55,365	33.84	−
Majority		3,244	1.98	−
Turnout		163,542	57.12	−
SP gain from BJP		Swing		

== See also ==
- Etah district
- Etah Lok Sabha constituency
- Sixteenth Legislative Assembly of Uttar Pradesh
- Uttar Pradesh Legislative Assembly
- Vidhan Bhawan
