= Chandrapal Singh =

Chandrapal Singh may refer to:

- Chandrapal Singh (cricketer), Indian cricketer
- Chandrapal Singh (politician), Indian politician
- Chaudhary Chandrapal Singh, former cabinet minister in Government of Uttar Pradesh
- Chandrapal Singh Yadav, Rajya Sabha member from Uttar Pradesh
