= Anita Singh Rajput =

Indian politician

Member of Legislative Assembly, Uttar Pradesh
- In office 2017–2022

Personal details
- Born: Bulandshahar, Uttar Pradesh
- Party: Bhartiya Janta Party
- Spouse: Nawab Singh Rajput
- Education: G.B.Pant University Pantnagar U.P.
- Profession: Social worker, politician

Anita Singh Rajput is an Indian politician from Uttar Pradesh.

== Education ==
In 1999 she received a doctorate degree in agriculture from GB Pant University of Pant Nagar.

== Political life ==
Initially she was basic label worker in public. In 2017 she was elected a Member of the Legislative Assembly of Uttar Pradesh from Debai (Assembly constituency) as the Bharatiya Janta Party candidate. She got 1,11,807 votes in this election.
