= Devesh Shakya =

Indian politician (born 1981)

Member of Parliament, Lok Sabha
- Incumbent
- Assumed office 4 June 2024
- Preceded by: Rajveer Singh
- Constituency: Etah, Uttar Pradesh

Personal details
- Born: 15 May 1981 (age 45) Etawah, Uttar Pradesh, India
- Party: Samajwadi Party
- Spouse: Sapna Shakya (m. 2005)
- Education: K.K. P.G. College, Etawah, Chhatrapati Shahu Ji Maharaj University
- Profession: Agriculturist

Devesh Shakya (Hindi pronunciation: [d̪eːʋeːʃ ʃaːkjə]; born 15 May 1981) is an Indian politician and a member of Parliament of India, Lok Sabha from Etah Lok Sabha constituency of Uttar Pradesh. Shakya is a member of Samajwadi Party. He defeated Bharatiya Janata Party's two-term member of parliament from this constituency, Rajveer Singh, son of former Uttar Pradesh Chief Minister and veteran BJP leader Kalyan Singh.

Devesh Shakya comes from a political family of Uttar Pradesh. He is the brother of former member of Uttar Pradesh Legislative Assembly, Vinay Shakya. He started his political career in the year 2002 and in 2005 and 2010, he won the election of the member of Zila Panchayat (a local body election). However, he failed to win the election of Chairman of Zila Panchayat.

== Personal life ==
Devesh Shakya was born in Etawah on 15 May 1981. His father's name is Babu Ram Shakya while his mother's name is Dropadi Devi. He has done B.A and LLB from Kanpur University. On 18 June 2005, he married Sapna Shakya.

== Political career ==
In 2024 Indian general elections to Lok Sabha, Samajwadi Party fielded Devesh Shakya from Etah Lok Sabha constituency against the sitting MP Rajveer Singh. He defeated Singh by getting 4,75,808 votes and became the member of Indian Parliament for the first time. Shakya visited his constituency frequently to keep himself aware of the situation of his constituency after getting elected to Lok Sabha. In 2024, he, along with national spokesperson of Samajwadi Party, Abdul Hafiz Gandhi visited Kasganj located in his constituency to examine the situation of people in the flood that occurred in the meantime. After examining the area, Shakya and Gandhi met District Magistrate of the Kasganj for deliberating on relief measures to be provided to the victims.

In 18th Lok Sabha, he became a member of Committee on Information and Communication Technology.

== See also ==
- Sunil Kumar Kushwaha
