= Jan Kranti Party =

Defunct political party in Uttar Pradesh, India

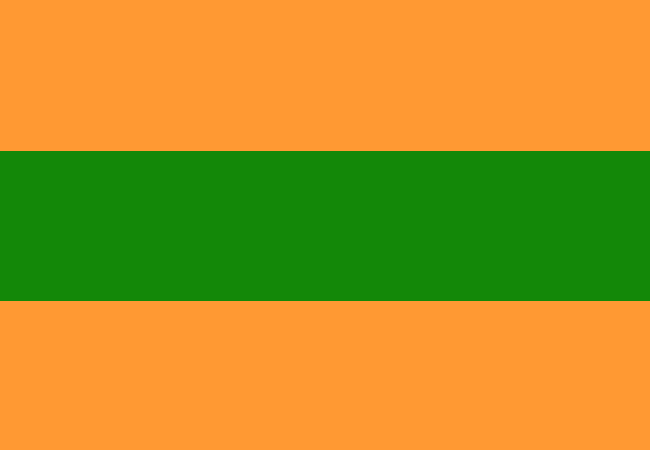
- Chairperson: Rajveer Singh
- Secretary: Brish Bhan Agrawal
- Founder: Kalyan Singh
- Founded: 5 January 2010
- Dissolved: 21 January 2013
- Split from: Bharatiya Janata Party
- Merged into: Bharatiya Janata Party
- Ideology: Hindutva
- Political position: Right-wing

Election symbol
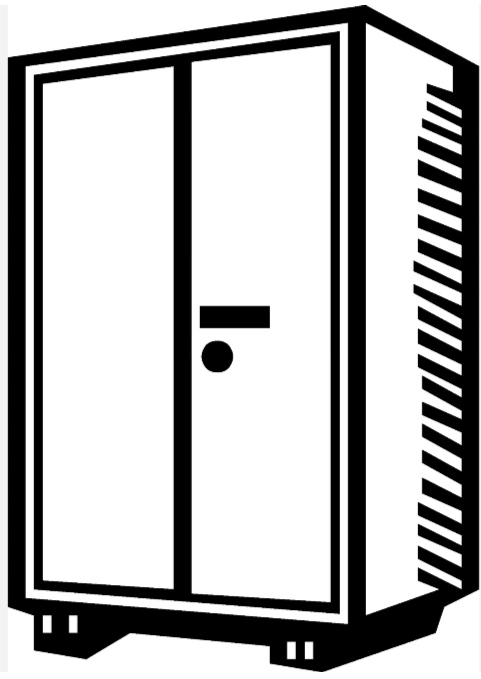

Jan Kranti Party was a political party in Uttar Pradesh, India, based on Hindutva. It was founded by Kalyan Singh, a former Chief Minister of Uttar Pradesh, on 5 January 2010 (in connection with Singh's 76th birthday). The party adopted Almirah as its Election symbol. The launching of the new party occurred two months after an alliance between Singh and the Samajwadi Party broke down. Upon the founding of the party, Singh handed over the leadership of the party to his son, Rajveer Singh, who was named national president.

== Foundation ==
Citing neglect and humiliation by his then party, the Bharatiya Janata Party (BJP), Kalyan Singh, who was a former state Chief Minister, resigned his membership and position as a national vice-president of the party on 20 January 2009. On the following day, after meeting Samajwadi Party (SP) leaders Mulayam Singh Yadav and Amar Singh, Kalyan Singh announced that he would campaign for the SP in the 2009 Indian general elections. Meanwhile, his son Rajveer Singh, whose treatment was one of the main reasons for his disenchantment with the BJP, joined the SP.

On 14 November, Yadav said that the poor performance of the SP at the Firozabad by-election was due to the loss of Muslim support and attributed it to the involvement of Kalyan Singh. Snubbed by Yadav, Kalyan Singh reaffirmed his allegiance to the BJP and the Rashtriya Swayamsevak Sangh. He indicated that he was willing to rejoin the BJP, and his son resigned from the SP. In January 2010, Kalyan Singh announced the formation of a new Hindutva-oriented political party, the Jan Kranti Party, but chose to take the role of patron while his son became the leader.

At the time of the founding of the new party, Kalyan Singh declared that the intention of the party was to contest all 403 constituencies in the 2012 Uttar Pradesh Legislative Assembly election.

== Merger with BJP ==
On 21 January 2013, Kalyan Singh announced the merger of both of his parties – the Rashtriya Kranti Party (RKP), which he formed after being suspended from the BJP in 1999, and also the Jan Kranti Party (JKP) – with the BJP. However, he chose not to "officially join the BJP" on the advice of senior party leaders. The reason for this was that the BJP leadership did not want Kalyan Singh to have to resign his seat in the Lok Sabha, representing Etah, which he had won in the 2009 parliamentary election.
