= Ashish Kumar Yadav =

Indian politician

Ashish Kumar Yadav (Ashu)

Member of Uttar Pradesh Legislative Council
- Incumbent
- Assumed office April 2022
- Preceded by: Udayveer Singh
- Constituency: Mathura-Etah-Mainpuri Local Authorities

Member of Uttar Pradesh Legislative Assembly
- In office March 2012 – March 2017
- Preceded by: Prajapalan
- Succeeded by: Vipin Kumar David
- Constituency: Etah

Personal details
- Born: 17 July 1984 (age 42) Etah, Uttar Pradesh
- Party: Bharatiya Janata Party (2022-)
- Other political affiliations: Samajwadi Party (2012-2017)
- Spouse: Meena Yadav (wife)
- Children: 1 son & 1 daughter
- Parent: Ramesh Yadav (father)
- Profession: Farmer, businessperson, politician

Ashish Kumar Yadav (Ashu) is a Member of Uttar Pradesh Legislative Council representing Mathura-Etah-Mainpuri Local Authorities constituency on BJP ticket. He previously served as Member of 16th Legislative Assembly of Uttar Pradesh representing Etah on SP ticket.

== Early life and education ==
Yadav was born in Etah district. He is educated till twelfth grade.

== Political career ==
Yadav has been a MLA for one term. He represented the Etah constituency and is a member of the Samajwadi Party political party. He joined Bhartiya Janta party (March 2022). BJP announced he was candidate of MLC from Mathura-Etah-Mainpuri Local Authorities constituency which he won and became MLC.

== Posts held ==
#	From	To	Position	Comments
01	April 2022		Member, Uttar Pradesh Legislative Council	
02	March 2012	March 2017	Member, 16th Legislative Assembly	

== See also ==
- Etah (Assembly constituency)
- Sixteenth Legislative Assembly of Uttar Pradesh
- Uttar Pradesh Legislative Assembly
- Uttar Pradesh Legislative Council
- Mathura-Etah-Mainpuri Local Authorities
