= Chandrapal Singh (politician) =

Indian politician

Chandrapal Singh is an Indian politician who is serving as Member of 18th Uttar Pradesh Legislative Assembly from Debai Assembly constituency. In 2022 Uttar Pradesh Legislative Assembly election, he won with 1,28,640 votes.
