= Rohanlal Chaturvedi =

Indian politician (born 1919)

Member of Parliament, Lok Sabha
- In office 1967–1977
- Constituency: Etah
- In office 1952–1957

Personal details
- Born: July 7, 1919 Lakhimpur Kheri, Uttar Pradesh
- Party: Indian National Congress
- Spouse: Daya Chaturvedi
- Parent: Sri Jwala Prasad Chaturvedi (Father)
- Education: Allahabad University
- Occupation: Politician, Advocate

Rohan Chaturvedi (born 7 July 1919, date of death unknown) was an Indian politician who was a member of 5th Lok Sabha from Etah (Lok Sabha constituency) in Uttar Pradesh State, India. He was born in Lakhimpur Kheri.

== Early life and education ==
Rohanlal Chaturvedi was born in Lakhimpur Kheri, Uttar Pradesh. He was educated at the Allahabad University, where he earned his B.A. and LL.B. degrees. He was an advocate by profession and joined the Congress party during the independence movement.

== Political career ==
- Parliamentary Career: He was first elected in 1952 from Etah District (Central) constituency. He later served in the 4th (1967) and 5th (1971) Lok Sabha.
- Ministerial Roles: He served as the Deputy Minister in the Ministry of Railways and later in the Ministry of Parliamentary Affairs.

Barhan Jn to Etah railway line was sanctioned and got operational during his tenure as Minister of state (Railways).

=== Electoral performance ===
Year	Election	Constituency	Party	Result
1952	1st Lok Sabha	Etah Dist. (Central)	INC	Won
1967	4th Lok Sabha	Etah	INC	Won
1971	5th Lok Sabha	Etah	INC	Won

== Death ==
Chaturvedi died prior to 2012.
