= Viresh Yadav =

Indian politician

MLA, 16th Legislative Assembly
- In office Mar 2012 – Mar 2017
- Preceded by: Premlata Devi
- Succeeded by: Sandeep Singh
- Constituency: Atrauli

MLA, 14th Legislative Assembly
- In office Feb-2002 – May-2007
- Preceded by: Ram singh
- Succeeded by: Not contested
- Constituency: Gangiri

MLA, 12th Legislative Assembly
- In office Dec-1993 – Oct-1995
- Preceded by: Ram singh
- Succeeded by: Ram singh
- Constituency: Gangiri

Personal details
- Born: 1 February 1965 (age 61) Aligarh district
- Party: Samajwadi Party
- Spouse: Rekha Yadav (wife)
- Children: 3 sons
- Parent: Babu Singh Yadav (father)
- Education: Aligarh Muslim University
- Profession: Farmer & politician

Viresh Yadav is an Indian politician and a member of the 16th Legislative Assembly of India. He represented the Atrauli constituency of Uttar Pradesh and is a member of the Samajwadi Party political party.

== Early life and education ==
Viresh Yadav was born in Aligarh district. He attended the Aligarh Muslim University and attained Bachelor of Arts degree.

== Political career ==
Viresh Yadav has been a MLA for three terms. He represented the Atrauli constituency and is a member of the Samajwadi Party political party.

Yadav lost his seat in the 2017 Uttar Pradesh Legislative Assembly election to Sandeep Singh of the Bharatiya Janata Party.

== Posts held ==
#	From	To	Position	Comments
01	2012	2017	Member, 16th Legislative Assembly	
02	2002	2007	Member, 14th Legislative Assembly	
03	1993	1995	Member, 12th Legislative Assembly	

== See also ==
- Atrauli (Assembly constituency)
- Sixteenth Legislative Assembly of Uttar Pradesh
- Uttar Pradesh Legislative Assembly
