= Hitesh Kumari =

Indian politician

Member of the Legislative Assembly, 9th Uttar Pradesh Legislative Assembly
- In office 1985–1989
- Preceded by: Swami Nempal
- Succeeded by: Nem Pal
- Constituency: Debai, Bulandshahr district, Uttar Pradesh

Personal details
- Born: 18 March 1942 (age 84)
- Party: Indian National Congress

Hitesh Kumari (Hindi: हितेश कुमारी; born 18 March 1942) is a Backward Leader of Uttar Pradesh. She belongs to the Lodhi caste. In 1985, representing the Indian National Congress, she was elected as a Member of the Uttar Pradesh Legislative Assembly for the Debai constituency in Bulandshahr district. In 1988, Uttar Pradesh Chief Minister N. D. Tiwari made her a minister with a portfolio of water resources. She was the second woman MLA from the Bulandshahr district, and the first lady minister in the district. She was also appointed a Member of the Indian Council of Agricultural Research (Central Government, Ministry of Agriculture). Later on she joined the Samajwadi Party in 2007, and in year 2015 she was appointed a National General Secretary of Mahila Wing of Samajwadi Party. In 2021 she was appointed a National Secretary in main body of Samajwadi Party by National President Akhilesh Yadav.
