= Etah Lok Sabha constituency =

Lok Sabha Constituency in Uttar Pradesh, India

Coordinates: 27.56°N 78.66°E

Etah UP-22
- Lok Sabha constituency
- Interactive Map Outlining Etah Lok Sabha constituency

Constituency details
- Country: India
- Region: North India
- State: Uttar Pradesh
- Assembly constituencies: Kasganj; Amanpur; Patiyali; Etah; Marhara
- Established: 1952
- Total electors: 17,00,406
- Reservation: None

Member of Parliament
- 18th Lok Sabha
- Incumbent Devesh Shakya
- Party: Samajwadi Party
- Elected year: 2024

Etah (Hindi pronunciation: [eːʈaː]) is one of the 80 Lok Sabha (parliamentary) constituencies in the Indian state of Uttar Pradesh.

This parliamentary constituency has been in existence since the first Lok Sabha elections held in the country in 1952. After 2008, the nature of this parliamentary seat changed. Now, 5 assembly constituencies come under this Lok Sabha seat. They are Kasganj, Amanpur, Patiali, Etah and Marhara.

== Assembly segments ==
Presently, Etah Lok Sabha constituency comprises five Vidhan Sabha (legislative assembly) segments. These are:

No	Name	District	Member	Party	2024 Lead
100	Kasganj	Kasganj	Devendra Singh	BJP	BJP
101	Amanpur	Kasganj	Hariom Verma	BJP	BJP
102	Patiyali	Kasganj	Nadira Sultan	SP	SP
104	Etah	Etah	Vipin Verma David	BJP	SP
105	Marhara	Etah	Virendra Lodhi	BJP	BJP

== Members of Parliament ==
Year	Member	Party
1952	Rohanlal	Indian National Congress
1957	Bishanchander Seth	Hindu Mahasabha
1962	Bishanchander Seth	Hindu Mahasabha
1967	Rohanlal	Indian National Congress
1971	Rohanlal	Indian National Congress
1977	Mahadeepak Shakya	Janata Party
1980	Mushir Ahmad Khan	Indian National Congress
1984	Mohammad Mahfooz Ali	Lok Dal
1989	Mahadeepak Shakya	Bharatiya Janata Party
1991	Mahadeepak Shakya	Bharatiya Janata Party
1996	Mahadeepak Shakya	Bharatiya Janata Party
1998	Mahadeepak Shakya	Bharatiya Janata Party
1999	Devendra Singh Yadav	Samajwadi Party
2004	Devendra Singh Yadav	Samajwadi Party
2009	Kalyan Singh	Independent
2014	Rajveer Singh	Bharatiya Janta Party
2019	Rajveer Singh	Bharatiya Janta Party
2024	Devesh Shakya	Samajwadi Party

== Election results ==
Vote share of Winning candidates
2024	47.09%
2019	54.52%
2014	51.28%
2009	48.57%
2004	47.04%
1999	38.66%
1998	44.28%
1996	40.50%
1991	33.40%
1989	32.81%
1984	31.57%
1980	31.47%
1977	71.94%
1971	33.59%
1967	37.75%
1962	25.10%
1957	36.73%
1952	40.52%

=== 2024 ===
2024 Indian general election: Etah
Party	Candidate	Votes	%	±%
SP	Devesh Shakya	475,808	47.09	▲4.84
BJP	Rajveer Singh	4,47,756	44.32	▼10.20
BSP	Mohammad Irfan	71,585	7.08	▲7.08
NOTA	None of the Above	5,156	0.51	▼0.12
Majority		28,052	2.77	▼9.51
Turnout		10,10,381	59.42	▼2.28
SP gain from BJP		Swing		

=== 2019 ===
2019 Indian general elections: Etah
Party	Candidate	Votes	%	±%
BJP	Rajveer Singh	545,348	54.52	+3.24
SP	Devendra Singh Yadav	4,22,678	42.25	+12.67
IND	Hari Om	6,339	0.64	New
NOTA	None of the Above	6,277	0.63	−0.04
Margin of victory		1,22,670	12.28	−8.82
Turnout		10,00,352	61.70	+2.98
BJP hold		Swing		

=== 2014 ===
2014 Indian general elections: Etah
Party	Candidate	Votes	%	±%
BJP	Rajveer Singh	474,978	51.28	
SP	Devendra Singh Yadav	2,73,977	29.58	
BSP	Noor Mohammad Khan	1,37,127	14.80	
MD	Th. Jogindra Singh Bhadoriya	12,445	1.34	
IND	Rakesh Gandhi	7,123	0.77	
NOTA	None of the Above	6,201	0.67	
Margin of victory		2,01,001	21.70	
Turnout		9,26,283	58.72	
BJP gain from Independent		Swing		

=== 2009 ===
2009 Indian general election: Etah
Party	Candidate	Votes	%	±%
IND	Kalyan Singh	2,75,717	48.57	
BSP	Devendra Singh Yadav	1,47,449	25.97	▲16.28
BJP	Shyam Singh Shakya	88,562	15.60	▼22.69
INC	Mahadeepak Singh Shakya	25,048	4.41	▲0.59
IND	9 Independent Candidates	15,255	2.69	
OTH	6 Other Party Candidates	15,694	2.76	
Majority		1,28,268	22.60	▲13.85
Turnout		5,67,725		
Independent gain from SP		Swing		

=== 2004 ===
2004 Indian general election: Etah
Party	Candidate	Votes	%	±%
SP	Devendra Singh Yadav	276,156	47.04	▲8.38
BJP	Ashok Ratan Shakya	2,24,821	38.29	▲8.57
BSP	Ramgopal Shakya	56,873	9.69	▼7.69
INC	Ravindr	22,454	3.82	▼8.42
IND	2 Independent Candidates	3,735	0.64	
OTH	2 Other Party Candidates	3,079	0.52	
Majority		51,335	8.75	▼0.19
Turnout		5,87,118		
SP hold		Swing		

=== 1999 ===
1999 Indian general election: Etah
Party	Candidate	Votes	%	±%
SP	Devendra Singh Yadav	226,999	38.66	▼3.75
BJP	Mahadeepak Singh Shakya	1,74,475	29.72	▼14.56
BSP	Seth Sultan Alam	1,02,048	17.38	▲8.15
INC	Rajendra Singh	71,892	12.24	▲11.06
IND	10 Independent Candidates	10,136	1.72	
OTH	2 Other Party Candidates	1,588	0.27	
Majority		52,524	8.94	▲7.07
Turnout		5,95,040	57.39	
SP gain from BJP		Swing		

=== 1998 ===
1998 Indian general election: Etah
Party	Candidate	Votes	%	±%
BJP	Mahadeepak Singh Shakya	286,982	44.28	▲3.78
SP	Devendra Singh Yadav	2,74,842	42.41	▲11.61
BSP	Raghunath Singh Lodhi	59,807	9.23	▼10.27
INC	Kunwar Pal Singh	7,662	1.18	▼4.11
IND	9 Independent Candidates	16,674	2.58	
OTH	2 Other Party Candidates	2,090	0.32	
Majority		12,140	1.87	▼7.83
Turnout		6,57,622	63.87	
BJP hold		Swing		

=== 1996 ===
1996 Indian general election: Etah
Party	Candidate	Votes	%	±%
BJP	Mahadeepak Singh Shakya	190,855	40.50	▲7.10
SP	Ramesh Yadav	1,45,152	30.80	
BSP	Kailash Yadav	91,925	19.50	▲11.90
INC	Girish Chandra Mishra	24,940	5.29	▼7.54
IND	47 Independent Candidates	13,802	2.93	
OTH	3 Other Party Candidates	4,626	0.98	
Majority		45,703	9.70	▲4.24
Turnout		4,78,551	46.90	
BJP hold		Swing		

=== 1991 ===
1991 Indian general election: Etah
Party	Candidate	Votes	%	±%
BJP	Mahadeepak Singh Shakya	148,169	33.40	▲0.59
JP	Latoori Singh	1,23,937	27.94	
JD	Mushir Ahmad Khan	68,078	15.34	▼7.26
INC	Kailash Yadav	56,939	12.83	▼18.27
BSP	Radhey Syam	33,721	7.60	▲4.20
IND	7 Independent Candidates	6,215	1.40	
OTH	3 Other Party Candidates	6,595	1.49	
Majority		24,232	5.46	▲3.75
Turnout		4,66,126	55.50	
BJP gain from JP		Swing		

=== 1989 ===
1989 Indian general election: Etah
Party	Candidate	Votes	%	±%
BJP	Mahadeepak Singh Shakya	143,442	32.81	▲13.33
INC	Saleem Iqbal Shervani	1,35,969	31.10	▲0.51
JD	Md. Mahfooz Ali Khan	98,824	22.60	
BSP	Radhey Shyam	14,854	3.40	
IND	11 Independent Candidates	34,449	7.87	
OTH	2 Other Party Candidates	9,713	2.22	
Majority		7,473	1.71	▲0.73
Turnout		4,53,519	54.04	
BJP gain from LKD		Swing		

=== 1984 ===
1984 Indian general election: Etah
Party	Candidate	Votes	%	±%
LKD	Md. Mehfooj Ali Khan	110,627	31.57	
INC	Mushir Ahmad Khan	1,07,196	30.59	▼0.88
BJP	Netram Singh	68,256	19.48	
JP	Ganga Prasad	34,759	9.92	▼18.67
IND	11 Independent Candidates	26,427	7.55	
OTH	1 Other Party Candidate	3,138	0.90	
Majority		3,431	0.98	▼1.90
Turnout		3,56,446	54.38	
LKD gain from INC(I)		Swing		

=== 1980 ===
1980 Indian general election: Etah
Party	Candidate	Votes	%	±%
INC(I)	Mushir Ahmad Khan	91,340	31.47	▲8.23
JP	Mahadeepak Singh Shakya	83,000	28.59	▼43.35
JP(S)	Mohd. Arif	57,623	19.85	
INC(U)	Kshetrapal Singh Solanki	38,181	13.15	
AIFB	Pitamber	1,674	0.58	
IND	5 Independent Candidates	18,452	6.36	
Majority		8,340	2.88	▼45.82
Turnout		2,95,104	47.43	
INC(I) gain from JP		Swing		

=== 1977 ===
1977 Indian general election: Etah
Party	Candidate	Votes	%	±%
JP	Mahadeepak Singh	268,136	71.94	
INC	Mustafa Rashid Shervani	86,616	23.24	▼10.35
IND	4 Independent Candidates	17,953	4.82	
Majority		1,81,520	48.70	▲42.97
Turnout		3,78,143	66.96	
JP gain from INC		Swing		

=== 1971 ===
1971 Indian general election: Etah
Party	Candidate	Votes	%	±%
INC	Rohanlal Chaturvedi	97,037	33.59	
BKD	Multan Singh	80,478	27.86	
INC(O)	Ganga Prasad	78,965	27.33	
IND	Turan	9,910	3.43	
IND	Purshottam Deo	6,688	2.31	
PBI	Jai Prakash	5,676	1.96	
IND	Mulu	5,538	1.92	
RPI(K)	Ramji Lal	4,612	1.60	
Majority		16,559	5.73	
Turnout		2,95,425	57.46	
INC hold		Swing		

=== 1967 ===
1967 Indian general election: Etah
Party	Candidate	Votes	%	±%
INC	Rohanlal Chaturvedi	102,847	37.75	
ABJS	R. Singh	87,464	32.11	
RPI	R. Swarup	50,691	18.61	
SWA	S. Singh	31,418	11.53	
Majority		15,383	5.64	
Turnout		2,84,078	58.84	
INC gain from HM		Swing		

=== 1962 ===
1962 Indian general election: Etah
Party	Candidate	Votes	%	±%
HM	Bishan Chandra Seth	56,392	25.10	
INC	Roshan Lal Chaturvedi	45,778	20.38	
RPI	Sadiq Rawaz	35,308	15.72	
ABJS	Janki Devi	34,441	15.33	
PSP	Awwal Singh	31,666	14.10	
Socialist	Bhummi Raj	12,375	5.51	
IND	Kanchan Singh	8,678	3.86	
Majority		10,614	4.72	
Turnout		2,37,064	56.45	
HM gain from INC		Swing		

=== 1957 ===
1957 Indian general election: Etah
Party	Candidate	Votes	%	±%
INC	Rohan Lal	78,654	36.73	
IND	Suraj Singh	44,482	20.77	
ABJS	Lokpal Singh	35,724	16.68	
PSP	Bilash Chandra Singh	33,054	15.44	
IND	Diwakar Deshpande	22,203	10.37	
Majority		34,172	15.96	
Turnout		2,14,117	54.67	
INC hold		Swing		

=== 1952 ===
1951–52 Indian general election: Etah District (Central)
Party	Candidate	Votes	%	±%
INC	Rohan Lal Chaturvedi	68,367	40.52	
ABJS	Rao Krishan Pal Singh	38,782	22.98	
IND	Siya Ram	28,344	16.80	
KMPP	Babu Ram Verma	18,587	11.02	
Socialist	Satya Deo	14,650	8.68	
Majority		29,585	17.54	
Turnout		1,68,730	46.23	
INC win (new seat)				

== See also ==
- Etah district
- List of constituencies of the Lok Sabha
