= Rajveer Singh =

Indian politician (born 1959)

Rajveer Kalyan Singh

Member of Parliament, Lok Sabha
- In office 16 May 2014 – 4 June 2024
- Preceded by: Kalyan Singh
- Succeeded by: Devesh Shakya
- Constituency: Etah, Uttar Pradesh

Personal details
- Born: 15 March 1959 (age 67) Aligarh, Uttar Pradesh, India
- Party: Bharatiya Janata Party
- Other political affiliations: Samajwadi Party (Jan 2009- Nov 2009)
- Spouse: Premlata Verma (m. 1988)
- Children: 4 (including Sandeep Singh)
- Parent: Kalyan Singh (father)
- Occupation: Politician
- Profession: Agriculturist
- Nickname: Raju Bhaiya

Rajveer Kalyan Singh (born 15 March 1959) is an Indian politician and a member of Bharatiya Janata Party who won the 2014 and 2019 Indian general elections from Etah in Uttar Pradesh.

== Early life and education ==
Rajveer Singh was born on 15 March 1959 to Kalyan Singh and Ramvati Devi. He was born in Madhauli, a village in Aligarh district of Uttar Pradesh. Singh's educational qualifications include B.A. and LL.B. degrees from Agra University. He married Premlata Verma on 20 February 1988.

== Political career ==
- 2002 – 2007: Member, Uttar Pradesh Legislative Assembly
- 2003 – 2007: Health Minister, Govt. of Uttar Pradesh
- 2003: Member, Public Accounts Committee
- May 2014: Elected to 16th Lok Sabha
- 1 Sep. 2014 onwards: Member, Standing Committee on Industry
- 12 Sep. 2014 onwards: Member, Committee on Welfare of Other Backward Classes; Member, Consultative Committee, Ministry of Agriculture
