= Kalyan Singh =

Indian politician (1932–2021)

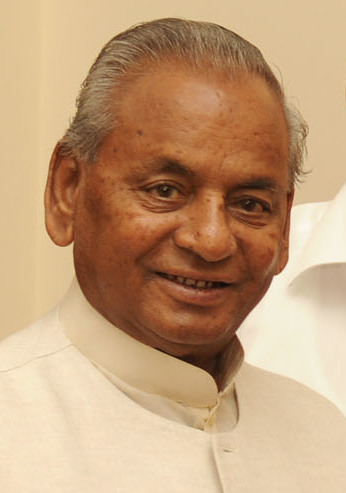
- Singh in September 2014

21st Governor of Rajasthan
- In office 4 September 2014 – 8 September 2019
- Chief Minister: Vasundhara Raje; Ashok Gehlot
- Preceded by: Ram Naik (Additional charge)
- Succeeded by: Kalraj Mishra

Governor of Himachal Pradesh
- Additional Charge
- In office 28 January 2015 – 12 August 2015
- Chief Minister: Virbhadra Singh
- Preceded by: Urmila Singh
- Succeeded by: Acharya Devvrat

Member of Parliament, Lok Sabha
- In office 16 May 2009 – 16 May 2014
- Preceded by: Devendra Singh Yadav
- Succeeded by: Rajveer Singh
- Constituency: Etah, Uttar Pradesh
- In office 13 May 2004 – 16 May 2009
- Preceded by: Chhatrapal Singh Lodha
- Succeeded by: Kamlesh Balmiki
- Constituency: Bulandshahr, Uttar Pradesh

16th Chief Minister of Uttar Pradesh
- In office 21 September 1997 — 12 November 1999 (suspended from 21 February 1998 to 23 February 1998)
- Preceded by: Kumari Mayawati
- Succeeded by: Ram Prakash Gupta
- In office 24 June 1991 – 6 December 1992
- Preceded by: Mulayam Singh Yadav
- Succeeded by: President's rule

Leader of the Opposition in Uttar Pradesh Legislative Assembly
- In office 4 July 1993 – 12 June 1995
- Leader of the House: Mulayam Singh Yadav
- Preceded by: Rewati Raman Singh
- Succeeded by: Mulayam Singh Yadav

Minister of State for Health in Uttar Pradesh
- In office 1977–1980
- Chief Minister: Ram Naresh Yadav; Banarsi Das

Member of Uttar Pradesh Legislative Assembly
- In office 1985–2004
- Preceded by: Anwar Khan
- Succeeded by: Premlata Devi
- Constituency: Atrauli
- In office 1967–1980
- Preceded by: Babu Singh
- Succeeded by: Anwar Khan
- Constituency: Atrauli

Personal details
- Born: 5 January 1932 Atrauli, United Provinces of Agra and Oudh, British India (present-day Uttar Pradesh, India)
- Died: 21 August 2021 (aged 89) Lucknow, Uttar Pradesh, India
- Party: Bharatiya Janata Party (until 1999, 2004–2009, 2013–2021)
- Other political affiliations: Rashtriya Kranti Party (1999–2002) Independent (2009–2010) Jan Kranti Party (2010-2013)
- Spouse: Ramwati Devi (m. 1952; died 2021)
- Children: 2 (including Rajveer Singh)
- Awards: Padma Vibhushan (2021; posthumous)

Kalyan Singh (5 January 1932 – 21 August 2021) was an Indian politician and a member of the Bharatiya Janata Party (BJP) who twice served as the Chief Minister of Uttar Pradesh. He was the Chief minister of Uttar Pradesh during the demolition of the Babri Masjid in December 1992. He was a prominent figure within Hindu nationalism, and in the agitation to build a Ram temple in Ayodhya.

Singh became a member of the Rashtriya Swayamsevak Sangh while still in school. He entered the Uttar Pradesh legislature as a Member of the Legislative Assembly for Atrauli in 1967. He won nine more elections to that constituency as a member of the Bharatiya Jana Sangh, the BJP, the Janata Party and the Rashtriya Kranti Party. Singh was appointed Chief Minister of Uttar Pradesh for the first time in 1991, but resigned following the demolition of the Babri Masjid. He became Chief Minister for a second term in 1997, but was removed by his party in 1999, and left the BJP, forming his own party.

Singh re-entered the BJP in 2004, and was elected a Member of Parliament from Bulandshahar. He left the BJP for a second time in 2009, and successfully contested the 2009 Indian general election as an independent from Etah. He joined the BJP again in 2014, and was appointed Governor of Rajasthan. He served a five-year term, and re-entered active politics in 2019. In September 2019 he was brought to trial for criminal conspiracy to demolish the Babri Masjid. He was acquitted by a special court of the Central Bureau of Investigation in 2020. He died on 21 August 2021 in Lucknow, Uttar Pradesh. He was posthumously awarded the Padma Vibhushan, India's second-highest civilian award.

== Early life and family ==
Kalyan Singh was born in Aligarh district in the United Provinces (now Uttar Pradesh) in 1932. He belonged to the Lodhi community. Singh was a swayamsevak, or volunteer, of the Hindu nationalist Rashtriya Swayamsevak Sangh, becoming a member while still in school. His son, Rajveer Singh, and grandson, Sandeep Singh, are also politicians and members of the Bharatiya Janata Party.

== Political career ==
=== Member of the Legislative Assembly ===
Singh contested elections to the Uttar Pradesh legislative assembly from the Atrauli assembly constituency for the first time in 1967 as a candidate of the Bharatiya Jana Sangh (BJS) and defeated his Indian National Congress (INC) opponent by 4351 votes. Singh contested each of the following ten legislative assembly elections from the same constituency, in 1969, 1974, 1977, 1980, 1985, 1989, 1991, 1993, 1996, and 2002. He won nine of these races, the exception coming in 1980, when he was defeated by Anwar Khan of the INC. Singh gradually rose through the ranks of the Uttar Pradesh BJP. He was made a state-level general secretary in 1980, elected state party president in 1984, and re-elected to the same post three years later. In 1989 he became leader of the BJP in the Uttar Pradesh legislature.

=== First term as Chief Minister ===
In late 1990 the BJP and its Hindu-nationalist affiliates organised the Ram Rath Yatra, a religious rally in support of its agitation to build a Hindu temple over the Babri Masjid in the city of Ayodhya. The yatra became a significant mass movement, and strengthened religious sentiments among Hindus. Considerable communal violence and polarization occurred in its aftermath. The BJP made large gains in the parliamentary and legislative elections that followed in 1991, and was able to form a government in Uttar Pradesh, with Kalyan Singh becoming the Chief Minister for the first time in June 1991.

As Chief Minister, Singh attempted to run an efficient administration, while also expressing strong support for the agitation to build a temple in Ayodhya. Under Singh's leadership, the Uttar Pradesh government acquired 2.77 acres (1.12 ha) of land adjacent to the Babri Masjid property. The purchase was ostensibly to construct tourist facilities, but it allowed Hindus to conduct religious rituals at the site without directly addressing the legal status of the Babri Masjid. He and other national leaders of the BJP, including Murli Manohar Joshi, traveled to the disputed site, and promised to build a Hindu temple there. The Singh government also removed Baba Lal Das, the Hindu priest who headed the temple that existed within the Babri Masjid complex, in March 1992. Lal Das had been a vocal opponent of the agitation to build a Hindu temple over the Babri Masjid.

On 6 December 1992, the RSS and its affiliates organised a rally involving 150,000 VHP and BJP kar sevaks at the site of the Babri Masjid. The ceremonies included speeches by BJP leaders such as L. K. Advani, Murli Manohar Joshi and Uma Bharti. Activists of the Bajrang Dal and the Shiv Sena attacked the mosque, breaking through the police barricade, and demolished it. Police present at the site did little to stop the demolition. Singh had previously given the Indian Supreme court an affidavit, in which he promised that no harm would come to the Babri Masjid. A few hours after the demolition, he resigned as Chief Minister. The Indian Union government dismissed the Uttar Pradesh state government on the same day.

=== Second term as Chief Minister ===
After a period of President's rule, state elections were held again in November 1993. Singh contested the elections from two constituencies, Atrauli and Kasganj, and won both. The vote share of the BJP was approximately the same as in the previous election, but the number of assembly seats it won declined from 221 to 177, and an alliance of the Samajwadi Party and the Bahujan Samaj Party (BSP) was able to form a government, with Mulayam Singh Yadav becoming the Chief Minister. The alliance between Yadav and Mayawati, leader of the BSP, broke down in 1995, and Mayawati became Chief Minister with the support of the BJP.

The Uttar Pradesh assembly elections of 1996 led to a hung assembly, and a further period of President's rule, before the BJP and the BSP formed an alliance with the BJP, allowing Mayawati to become Chief Minister in March 1997. Kalyan Singh became Chief Minister of Uttar Pradesh for the second time in September 1997, taking over from Mayawati as part of their power-sharing agreement. In February 1998, his government withdrew cases against those accused in the Babri Masjid demolition, stating that a Ram temple would be built at the site if the BJP were to take power in Delhi. The BSP and BJP came into conflict over the policies that the BSP government had implemented targeting Dalit social welfare. On 21 October 1997 the BSP withdrew support for Singh's government. Singh continued in office with the support of a breakaway faction of the BSP, and a breakaway faction of the INC, led by INC MLA Naresh Agrawal, the Akhil Bharatiya Loktantrik Congress. Singh's administration ended many of the BSP's Dalit-focused programmes soon after taking office.

On 21 February 1998, Singh's government was dismissed by the Governor of Uttar Pradesh, Romesh Bhandari, after Agrawal withdrew support to Singh's government. Bhandari invited Jagdambika Pal of the INC to form a new government, in which Agrawal became deputy chief minister. Bhandari's order was stayed by a division bench of the Allahabad High Court, which reinstated Singh's administration two days after its dismissal.

=== Departures from the BJP ===
As a member of the Lodhi community, Singh commanded support among Other Backward Class (OBC) groups, and his affiliation with the BJP had allowed it to expand its support beyond its traditional upper-caste base. However, he began to be seen as a "patron of the backward castes" by upper-caste members of his own party, and to face opposition as a result. Dissension within the party occurred at the same time as an increase in crime that Singh's administration was unable to control, and in May 1999, 36 BJP legislators resigned in protest at the continuation of Singh's administration. The BJP's central administration replaced Singh as Chief Minister: Singh left the BJP to form a new party, the Rashtriya Kranti Party (RKP). He contested and won the 2002 Uttar Pradesh assembly elections as a candidate of the RKP.

Singh returned to the BJP in January 2004, and was made head of the party's state-level election committee for the 2004 Indian general election. He successfully contested the election from the Bulandshahar Lok Sabha Constituency. Singh resigned his party membership and his post of national Vice President on 20 January 2009, citing "neglect and humiliation" in the BJP. After meetings with Samajwadi Party leaders Mulayam Singh Yadav and Amar Singh, Singh announced that he would campaign for the SP in the 2009 Lok Sabha elections. Meanwhile, his son Rajveer Singh, one of the main reasons of his disenchantment with the BJP, joined the Samajwadi Party. Singh was elected to the Lok Sabha from Etah as an independent. On 14 November 2009, Mulayam Singh Yadav said that the poor performance of the party at the Firozabad Lok Sabha by-election was due to the loss of Muslim support because of Kalyan Singh. In January 2010, he announced the formation of a new Hindutva-oriented political party, the Jan Kranti Party, but chose to take the role of patron while his son became the leader.

=== Second return to the BJP ===
Singh rejoined the BJP for the second time in March 2014, resigning his seat in the Lok Sabha to do so. A day later, he was made national Vice President once again. The Jan Kranti Party he had founded in 2010 had merged into the BJP in January 2013. His son Rajveer was elected member of parliament from Singh's previous constituency of Etah, as a member of the BJP. Singh was appointed Governor of Rajasthan in 2014, and was sworn in on 4 September. He was given the position of Governor of Himachal Pradesh as an additional charge in January 2015, and relinquished it in August of the same year. He was succeeded by Kalraj Mishra in 2019 after he completed his five-year term. Singh returned to active politics with the BJP, which hoped he could bring in support from those who supported a Hindutva agenda. Singh is considered a prominent figure within Hindu nationalism, and in the agitation to build a Ram temple in Ayodhya.

== Legal proceedings ==
Following the demolition of the Babri Masjid, the Indian Supreme Court initiated contempt-of-court proceedings against Singh. The charges stemmed from his failure to prevent the construction of a platform next to the Babri Masjid a few months before its demolition, despite a court order prohibiting it. As a consequence Singh was jailed for a single day, and fined ₹20,000. Scholar Amrita Basu described Singh's reaction to the demolition as "jubilant and unrepentant".

In December 1992, the Indian government set up the Liberhan Commission to investigate the destruction of the Babri Mosque, headed by retired High Court Judge M. S. Liberhan. After 399 sittings over sixteen years, the Commission submitted its 1,029-page report to Indian Prime Minister Manmohan Singh on 30 June 2009. According to the report, the events of 6 December 1992, in Ayodhya were "neither spontaneous nor unplanned". In April 2017, a special Central Bureau of Investigation court framed criminal conspiracy charges against Singh, Advani, and several others. The Supreme Court stated that Singh could not be tried at the time, as he had immunity from prosecution as Governor of Rajasthan. Singh was brought to trial in September 2019 after completing his term, was ordered to be placed in judicial custody, and was then granted bail. On 30 September 2020, the court acquitted all the 32 accused including Singh, on account of inconclusive evidence. The special court judge said, "The demolition was not pre-planned."

== Illness and death ==
Singh was taken ill on 3 July 2021, after he complained of nausea and difficulty in breathing. He was admitted to Dr. Ram Manohar Lohia Institute of Medical Sciences, where the doctors suspected renal issues. Later, his blood pressure rose dangerously, and he was transferred to Sanjay Gandhi Postgraduate Institute of Medical Sciences (SGPGI) for better treatment and management. He was on life-supporting ventilation. Several leaders and politicians, including the incumbent chief minister Yogi Adityanath, BJP President J. P. Nadda, and Uttar Pradesh Governor Anandiben Patel, visited Singh at the hospital. Singh died at the age of 89 on 21 August 2021 at the SGPGI, suffering from sepsis and multi-organ failures. He was posthumously awarded the Padma Vibhushan, India's second-highest civilian award, in January 2022.

Lok Sabha
Preceded by Chhatrapal Singh Lodha	Member of Parliament for Bulandshahr; 2004–2009	Succeeded by Kamlesh Balmiki
Preceded by Devendra Singh Yadav	Member of Parliament for Etah; 2009–2014	Succeeded by Rajveer Singh
Political offices
Preceded by Mulayam Singh Yadav	Chief minister of Uttar Pradesh; 24 June 1991 – 6 December 1992	Succeeded by President's rule
Preceded by Mayawati	Chief minister of Uttar Pradesh; 21 September 1997 – 12 November 1999	Succeeded by Ram Prakash Gupta
Preceded by Ram Naik; Additional Charge	Governor of Rajasthan; 4 September 2014 – 8 September 2019	Succeeded by Kalraj Mishra
Preceded by Urmila Singh	Governor of Himachal Pradesh; 28 January 2015 – 12 August 2015	Succeeded by Acharya Devvrat
