= Etah =

- City
- Location in Uttar Pradesh, India
- Coordinates: 27.63°N 78.67°E
- Country: India
- State: Uttar Pradesh
- District: Etah
- Founder: King Dil Sukh Rai Bhadur

Government
  - Type: Municipal Corporation
  - Body: Etah Municipal Corporation
  - Member of Parliament: Devesh Shakya (SP)
  - Municipal Commissioner: Sudha Gupta (BJP)

Population (2011)
  - Total: 131,023
  - Density: 724/km^{2} (1,880/sq mi)

Languages
  - Official: Hindi
- Time zone: UTC+5:30 (IST)
- Postal code: 207001
- Vehicle registration: UP-82

Etah (Hindi pronunciation: [eːʈaː]) is a small town and village suburb in western Uttar Pradesh, India, and is the headquarters of Etah District. It lies approximately 72 km (45 mi) northeast of Agra, 77 km (48 mi) southeast of Aligarh, 58 km (36 mi) northeast of Firozabad and 40 km (25 mi) southwest of the Ganges River.

== Geography ==
Etah is located at 27.63°N 78.67°E. It has an average elevation of 170 meters (557 feet). The upper and lower branches of the Ganga Canal flow through Etah.

== Demographics ==
According to the 2011 Census of India, Etah had a total population of 131,023, with 69,446 males and 61,577 females. The literacy rate was 85.62%. Out of the total population, about 12,000 are of Scheduled Castes and Scheduled Tribes.

Religions in Etah
Religion	Percent
Hindus	78.30%
Muslims	17.92%
Jains	2.80%
Others†	0.6%
Distribution of religions †Includes Sikhs (0.2%), Buddhists (<0.2%).

== Government and politics ==
Etah is governed by the Etah Nagar Palika Parishad, a municipal body responsible for local governance. The city covers an area of 13.49 km^{2} and is divided into 25 wards for administrative purposes. The municipality is headed by either the municipal commissioner or president It is represented by one Member of Parliament (MP) in the Lok Sabha.

== Urban planning ==
The city's master plan (1984–2001) was created by the U.P. Town and Country Planning Department.

== Notable residents ==
The Urdu poet Amir Khusro was born in Patiyali, Kasganj.

Shri Jai Prakash Shastri, an Arya Samaj Leader and the family priest of Ram Nath Kovind, the 14th President of India, is a resident of Himmatpur Kakamai Village in Etah District, Uttar Pradesh.

== Arya Samaj ==
Arya Samaj Himmatpur Kakamai is a social and religious organization located in Himmatpur Kakamai village in Etah district, Uttar Pradesh, India. Inspired by the teachings of Maharishi Dayanand Saraswati, the organization works for social reform, Vedic education and the promotion of moral and educational awareness in rural areas. It also organizes religious, educational, and community welfare activities for the local population.
