= Taapsee Pannu filmography =

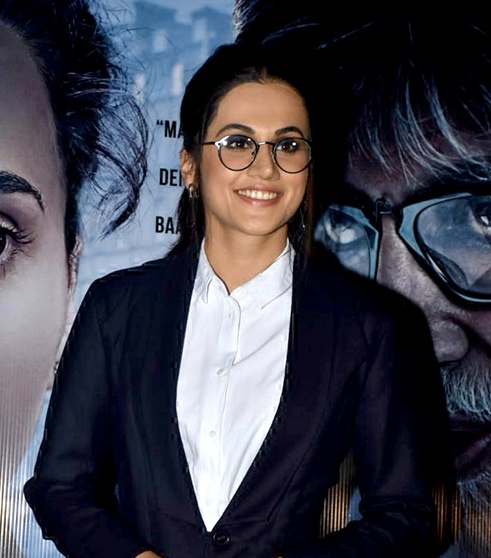
Pannu in 2019

Taapsee Pannu is an Indian actress who works in Hindi, Telugu and Tamil language films.

== Films ==
Key
| † | Denotes films that have not yet been released |

List of Taapsee Pannu film credits
| Year | Title | Role | Language | Notes | Ref. |
|---|---|---|---|---|---|
| 2010 | Jhummandi Naadam | Sravya | Telugu | Credited as Taapsee | |
| 2011 | Aadukalam | Irene | Tamil | Credited as Taapsee | |
| 2011 | Vastadu Naa Raju | Pooja | Telugu | Credited as Taapsee | |
| 2011 | Mr. Perfect | Maggie | Telugu | Credited as Taapsee | |
| 2011 | Veera | Aiki | Telugu | Credited as Taapsee | |
| 2011 | Vandhaan Vendraan | Anjana | Tamil | Credited as Taapsee | |
| 2011 | Mogudu | Rajarajeshwari | Telugu | Credited as Taapsee | |
| 2011 | Doubles | Saira Banu | Malayalam | Credited as Taapsee | |
| 2012 | Daruvu | Swetha | Telugu | | |
| 2013 | Gundello Godari | Sarala | Telugu | Credited as Taapsee | |
| 2013 | Chashme Baddoor | Seema Ranjan | Hindi | | |
| 2013 | Shadow | Madhubala | Telugu | Credited as Taapsee | |
| 2013 | Sahasam | Srinidhi | Telugu | | |
| 2013 | Arrambam | Anitha | Tamil | Credited as Taapsee | |
| 2014 | Kathai Thiraikathai Vasanam Iyakkam | Herself | Tamil | Cameo appearance | |
| 2015 | Baby | Shabana Khan / Priya Suryavanshi | Hindi | | |
| 2015 | Kanchana 2 | Nandini | Tamil | | |
| 2015 | Vai Raja Vai | Shreya | Tamil | Credited as Taapsee | |
| 2015 | Dongaata | Herself | Telugu | Cameo appearance | |
| 2016 | Pink | Meenal Arora | Hindi | | |
| 2017 | Running Shaadi | Nimmi | Hindi | | |
| 2017 | The Ghazi Attack | Dr. Ananya | Telugu | Bilingual film | |
| 2017 | The Ghazi Attack | Dr. Ananya | Hindi | Bilingual film | |
| 2017 | Naam Shabana | Shabana Khan | Hindi | | |
| 2017 | Anando Brahma | Unnamed ghost | Telugu | | |
| 2017 | Judwaa 2 | Samaara Jain | Hindi | | |
| 2018 | Dil Juunglee | Koroli Nair | Hindi | | |
| 2018 | Soorma | Harpreet Sandhu | Hindi | | |
| 2018 | Mulk | Aarti Malhotra Mohammad | Hindi | | |
| 2018 | Neevevaro | Kalavathi / Vennela / Jyothsna / Shruthi / Katyayani | Telugu | | |
| 2018 | Manmarziyaan | Rumi Bagga | Hindi | | |
| 2019 | Badla | Naina Sethi | Hindi | | |
| 2019 | Game Over | Swapna | Tamil | Bilingual film | |
| 2019 | Game Over | Swapna | Telugu | Bilingual film | |
| 2019 | Mission Mangal | Kritika Aggarwal | Hindi | | |
| 2019 | Saand Ki Aankh | Prakashi Tomar | Hindi | | |
| 2020 | Thappad | Amrita Sandhu | Hindi | | |
| 2021 | Haseen Dillruba | Rani Kashyap | Hindi | | |
| 2021 | Annabelle Sethupathi | Annabelle Sethupathi / Rudra | Tamil | | |
| 2021 | Rashmi Rocket | Rashmi Baweja | Hindi | | |
| 2022 | Looop Lapeta | Savina Borkar | Hindi | | |
| 2022 | Mishan Impossible | Sailaja | Telugu | | |
| 2022 | Shabaash Mithu | Mithali Raj | Hindi | | |
| 2022 | Dobaaraa | Antara Awasti / Vashisht | Hindi | | |
| 2022 | Tadka | Nicole Anne Mascarenhas | Hindi | | |
| 2022 | Blurr | Gayatri / Gautami | Hindi | Also producer | |
| 2023 | Dhak Dhak | – | Hindi | Producer | |
| 2023 | Dunki | Manu Randhawa | Hindi | | |
| 2024 | Phir Aayi Hasseen Dillruba | Rani Kashyap | Hindi | | |
| 2024 | Khel Khel Mein | Harpreet "Happy" Kaur Sodhi | Hindi | | |
| 2026 | Assi | Advocate Raavi | Hindi | | |
| 2026 | Gandhari | Bani | Hindi | | |
| TBA | Woh Ladki Hai Kahaan? † | ACP Komal Sharma | Hindi | Filming | |

== Television ==
List of Taapsee Pannu television credits
| Year | Title | Role | Language | Notes | Ref. |
|---|---|---|---|---|---|
| 2017 | Bigg Boss 1 | Herself | Telugu | TV reality show; Guest appearance | |
| 2022 | Bade Achhe Lagte Hain 2 | Dr. Antara | Hindi | For Promoting her film Dobaaraa | |
| 2024 | Nayanthara: Beyond the Fairytale | Herself | English / Tamil | | |

== Short films ==
List of Taapsee Pannu short film credits
| Year | Title | Role | Language | Ref. |
|---|---|---|---|---|
| 2018 | Baarish aur Chowmein | Neelu | Hindi | |
| 2018 | Nitishastra | Roshni | Hindi | |
