= Johri Jat =

Village in Uttar Pradesh, India

Johri Jat is a village in Bagpat district in Uttar Pradesh, India. It lies approximately nine kilometers from Baraut and four kilometers from Binauli. Two more villages, namely Angadpur and Kheri, are close by. It is difficult to distinguish between the three villages as there are no physical boundaries.

== History ==
Johri is the birthplace of freedom fighter Jay Ram Singh Tomar. Jay Ram Singh Tomar is a farmer who fought against the British during colonial rule. He was caught by British soldiers and hung. A statue in his honor is being created by the people of Johri with the help of the Indian government.

== Climate ==
The climate of Johri is warm and cool, with temperatures from April to September ranging between about 22 to 42 degrees Celsius and 9 to 18 degrees Celsius in October to March.

== Education ==
There are two government primary schools for boys and two for girls. Several private English Medium Schools are also functioning.

== Sports ==
Johri hosts a number of sporting events. Bridge and shooting are the most prominent. Younger residents can also be trained in archery and Kabaddi. Dheeraj Tomar, who started his career as a police officer but also has interest in cards, started playing bridge and founded the village's bridge team. The team played in many national and international tournaments. Prakashi Tomar and Chandro Tomar are well-known sharpshooters from Johri. Recently, the Indian government provided the village with a sports field with a guest house. Premier Shooting Range is a Center of Sports Authority of India. A new indoor range was constructed on a plot provided by the farmers of Johri. More than 200 villagers, after receiving sharpshooting training, have been employed in India's railway, airlines, army and police sectors.

== Notable people ==
- Chandro Tomar, octogenarian sharp shooter
- Prakashi Tomar, sharpshooter
- Seema Tomar, Silver Medal winner at the International Shooting Sport Federation
