= Tyodhi =

Village in India

Coordinates: 29°03′14″N 77°14′23″E

Tyodhi ट्यौढ़ी
- Village
- Interactive map of Tyodhi
- Country: India
- State: Uttar Pradesh
- District: Baghpat

Area
  - Total: 529.72 ha (1,309.0 acres)

Population (2011)
  - Total: 4,594
  - Density: 867.3/km^{2} (2,246/sq mi)
- Time zone: UTC+5:30 (IST)
- PIN: 250611

Tyodhi is a village and gram panchayat situated in the Baghpat block of Baghpat district, Uttar Pradesh, India. It has a population of approximately 4594 people, consisting of 2473 males and 2121 females as of 2011. The village consists of 749 households, and a significant portion of its population adheres to the Hindu faith. Within the population, 699 are children, with 392 males and 307 females. The village is home to 797 individuals belonging to Scheduled Castes, including 443 males and 354 females. However, there are no Scheduled Tribes reported in the village. The literacy rate in Tyodhi stands at 62.32%, with 2,863 literate individuals—1,768 males and 1,095 females. On the other hand, 1,731 people are illiterate, including 705 males and 1,026 females. The workforce in Tyodhi comprises 1,609 individuals, with a notable gender disparity: 1,283 males and only 326 females are engaged in some form of work. Within the village, there is a notable Amrit Sarovar (pond) along with two government primary schools. The nearest school for high school and intermediate studies is Intermediate College Sarurpur Kherki in Baghpat, located approximately 2 km away. The basic healthcare services are provided by government health and wellness center situated in Tyodhi. There is a government library located within the premises of the Government Primary School.

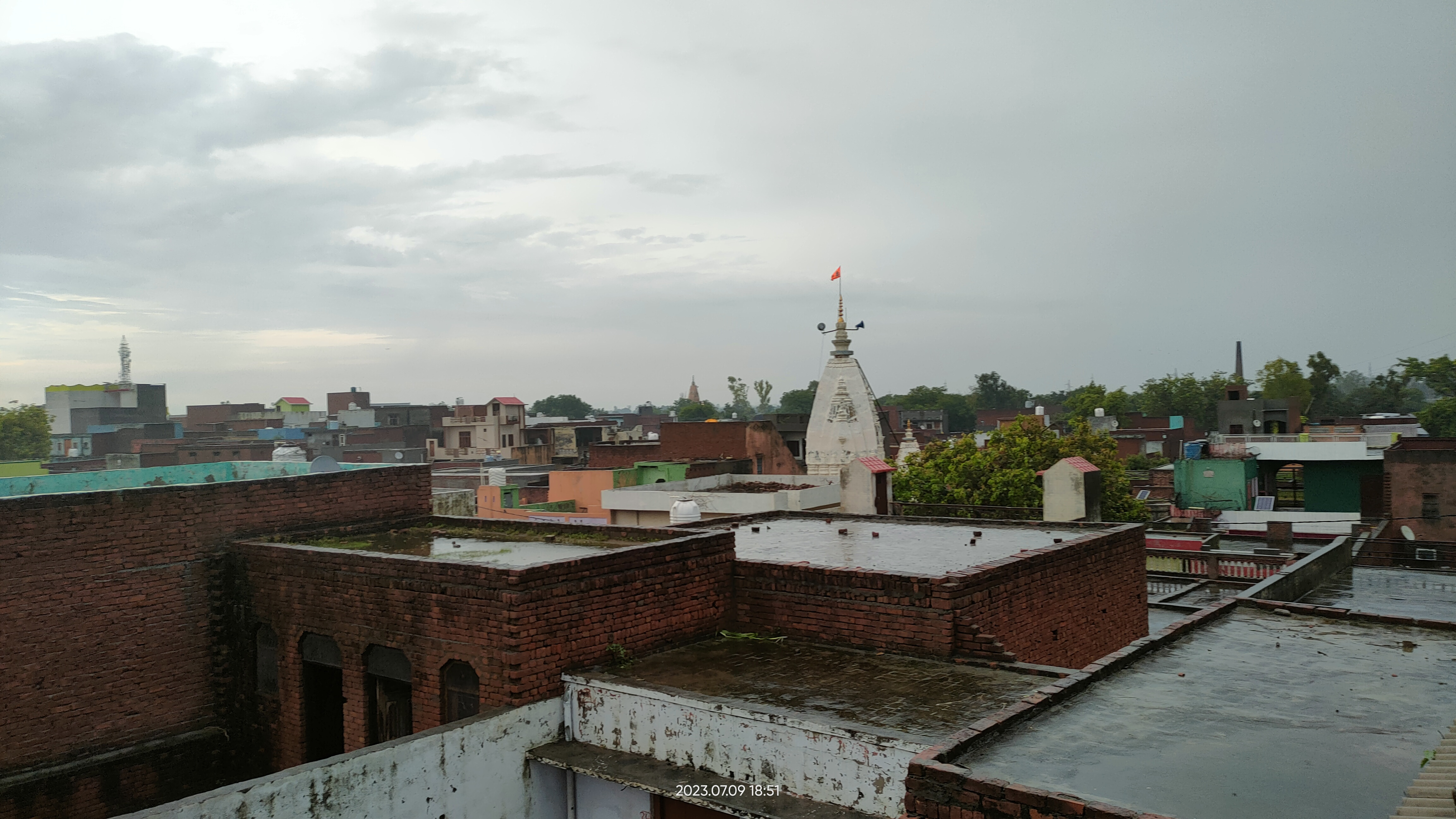
Aerial View of Tyodhi Village captured by Aman Kumar

The primary occupation of the villagers is agriculture with self-employment being the secondary occupation. For higher education, the nearest colleges are Janta Vaidic College and Digambar Jain College, both situated in Baraut. The primary market serving the village is Baraut, located approximately 3 km away. Tyodhi is also popular for its traditional khaat, a type of locally crafted wooden seating. Tyodhi is home to the headquarters of Udaan Youth Club, a youth club affiliated to Nehru Yuva Kendra Sangathan and governed by the youth of the village. Sachin Sharma is the recently elected Gram Pradhan of Village Tyodhi.

== Notable people ==
- Sah Mal, freedom fighter who led the 1857 mutiny from Baghpat
- Satya Pal Malik, politician, serving as the 21st Governor of Meghalaya
- Satya Pal Singh, Former Minister and Member of Parliament
- Nitin Tomar, Professional Indian Kabaddi Played
- Prakashi Tomar, Sharpshooter
