= Faizpur Ninana =

Village in Uttar Pradesh, India

फैज़पुर निनाना
- Village
- Faizpur Ninana

Government
  - Type: Sarpanch
  - Body: Gram panchayat

Population (2011)
  - Total: 5,735
- Time zone: GMT 5.30+
- Postal code: 250619
- Website: https://grampanchayatfaizpurninana.blogspot.com/

Faizpur Ninana (फैज़पुर निनाना) is a village, popularly known as Village of Martyrs, located in the Baghpat Block of Baghpat District in the state of Uttar Pradesh, India. It is part of the Meerut Division and lies approximately 10 kilometers north of the district headquarters, Baghpat. The village is situated at an elevation of 229 meters above sea level and is positioned near the Haryana state border, adding to its strategic significance.

As per the 2011 Census, Faizpur Ninana has a total population of 5,735 individuals residing in 890 households. The gender distribution shows that females constitute 45.4% of the population, with a total of 2,604 females. The literacy rate of the village is 64.2%, which indicates a moderate level of education among the residents. However, female literacy stands at 23.6%, reflecting a significant gender gap in education. The Scheduled Caste population accounts for 18.9% of the village's demographic composition, while there are no Scheduled Tribes reported. The primary languages spoken in Faizpur Ninana are Hindi and Urdu, aligning with the linguistic trends of the region. The village's culture is deeply rooted in its folk songs (Lok Geet, Raginee etc.) traditions, with a simple and harmonious way of life being a hallmark of its residents. This Village have Amrit Sarovar (Pond) named Shaheed Captain Maharaj Singh which is a place of attraction.

Faizpur Ninana has a basic yet functional infrastructure that caters to the needs of its residents. The village has an intermediate college, Ch. Charan Singh Vedik Intermediate College, which plays a vital role in providing education to the local youth. The village is also served by a Primary Health Centre, ensuring that primary medical needs are met and this PHC has stood out among Top 10 outstanding PHC of the state Uttar Pradesh. This village is of utmost spiritual importance as it have Jeevit Temple like Parshurameshwar Mandir of Pura Mahadev.

The village is connected to nearby areas by road, with the National Highways NH334 and NH334B being easily accessible. The closest railway stations are Sujra and Alawalpur Idrispur, which provide rail connectivity to other parts of the state and beyond.

The economy of Faizpur Ninana is primarily agrarian, with farming being the main occupation of the villagers. The village participates in the nearby Baghpat market/mandi, where commodities are traded, contributing to the local economy. The working population constitutes 29.5% of the total, reflecting the village's reliance on agriculture and related activities.

Faizpur Ninana falls under the Baraut assembly constituency, currently represented by MLA Krishan Pal Malik. At the parliamentary level, it is part of the Baghpat constituency, with Dr. Raj Kumar Sangwan serving as the Member of Parliament. The local governance is managed by the village panchayat, headed by Sarpanch Priti Devi and Sarpanch Representative Rohit Dhankar (National level Sports person). Faizpur Ninana has produced several individuals who have contributed to the village's development and the broader community.

Faizpur Ninana is recognized for its contributions to community development, including the establishment of a model library that serves as an important educational resource for the village. The development of the ICT-based Kanwar Yatra QR Code App by Aman Kumar, a local resident, has also brought attention to the village, enhancing the safety and organization of the annual pilgrimage. Faizpur Ninana has been honored with the Chief Minister's Panchayat Puraskar, acknowledging its excellence in local governance. Additionally, the village's Primary Health Center (PHC) achieved the first rank in the district Baghpat under the Kayakalp initiative.
