= Kirthal =

- Village
- Location within Uttar Pradesh Location within India
- Coordinates: 29°14′35″N 77°14′30″E
- Country: India
- State: Uttar Pradesh
- Division: Meerut
- District: Baghpat
- Tehsil: Baraut
- Elevation: 768 ft (234 m)
- Time zone: UTC+5:30 (IST)
- PIN: 250623
- Telephone: 01234
- ISO 3166 code: IN-UP

Kirthal is a large village in Baraut Tehsil, Uttar Pradesh State, India. It lies in the northwest of Bagpat District, near the border with Haryana State. Kirthal's village code is 1038000 and its main post office is in Chhaprauli.

== Geography ==
Kirthal is situated 6.0 kilometres (3.7 mi) west of State highway 57, and 10.0 kilometres (6.2 mi) east of the Yamuna River, at Ramala-Tanda road. The village is 33.25 kilometres (20.66 mi) from the city of Baghpat, 21 kilometres (13 mi) from Baraut tehsil, 71 kilometres (44 mi) from Meerut, and 527 kilometres (327 mi) from the state capital of Lucknow.

Villages nearby include Loomb (लूम्ब) (3.2 kilometres (2.0 mi)), Sonti (सोंटी) (3.4 kilometres (2.1 mi)), Ramala (रमाला) (5.0 kilometres (3.1 mi)), Hewa (हेवा) (3.6 kilometres (2.2 mi)), Kakripur (ककडीपुर) (3.6 kilometres (2.2 mi)), Mukandpur (मुकंदपुर) (4.5 kilometres (2.8 mi)), and Soop (सूप) (4.7 kilometres (2.9 mi)).
