= Singhawali Ahir =

Village in Uttar Pradesh, India

Singhawali Ahir is a village in the Baghpat District of Uttar Pradesh in India. It has a population of approximately 15,000 people. Singhawali Ahir also has a police station. The famous temple is Durga Devi.

== Geography ==
It is located 20 km to the east of District headquarters Bagpat, 6 km from Pilana, and 491 km from the state capital, Lucknow.

The Pin code of Singhawali Ahir is 250606 and the postal head office is Aminagar Sarai.

Nearby villages are: Poother (2 km), Budhseni (3 km), Shahjahanpur Tisotra Urf Nwada (3 km), Luhara (3 km), and Matanat Nagar (4 km). Singhawali Ahir is surrounded by Binauli Tehsil to the north, Janikhurd Tehsil to the east, and Khekra Tehsil and Baghpat Tehsil to the west.

Modinagar, Muradnagar, Loni, Sardhana are neighboring cities to Singhawali Ahir.

This place is in the border of the Baghpat District and the Meerut District. Meerut District Janikhurd is east towards this place.

This is the biggest village of Yadavs. Gangaram Yadav was the first person who came into this village along with others.

== Demographics of Singhawali Ahir ==
The local language spoken is Hindi.

== How to reach Singhawali ==
=== By rail ===
There is no railway station near to Singhawali Ahir within 10 km. However, Meerut City Junction is a major railway station 29 km from Singhawali Ahir.
