= Asara, India =

Asara
- Town
- Location in Uttar Pradesh, India
- Coordinates: 29°14′57.83″N 77°17′29.389″E
- Country: India
- State: Uttar Pradesh
- District: Baghpat district

Population (2011)
  - Total: 16,000

Languages
  - Official: Hindi
- Time zone: UTC+5:30 (IST)
- PIN: 250623
- Vehicle registration: UP 17

Asara is a large village situated on National Highway 709B (India) in the Chhaprauli Mandal of Baghpat District in Uttar Pradesh, India. The village is about 12.01 kilometres from the town of Chhaprauli, and is 33.70 km from district headquarters at Baghpat, and situated on the banks of the Yumuna Canal. Village head is Nadeem Ahmad

== Connectivity ==
Asara is well connected to Delhi as well as Other cities via NH-709B and Asara Railway Station on Delhi-Shamli-Saharanpur Railway line.

== Geography ==
Asara is the biggest village of Baghpat district in context of area, It has 52000 Bigha (land measure unit in U.P.) farming land. In east there is Krishni rever. Villages nearby include Kakripur (2.3 km), Bhudpur (3.0 km), Ramala (3.4 km), Fatehpur Chak (4.3 km), Ibrahimpur Majra (4.8 km), Sujti (4.9 km) and Kirthal (5.4 km).

== People ==
It is a predominantly Muslim village, being the dominant community having more than 90% share in population of about 25,000.

== History ==
The village was said to have been founded by Mubarak Khan of Kirthal about six hundred years ago. Mubarak Khan was a soldier in Prithvi Raj Chauhan army. during his visit to Iran he fell in love with an Iranian Muslim girl but his villagers did not allow him to do so, Khan decided to quit his village Kirthal and live in cottage in forest, after all this cottage gradually turn into a village presently named Asara. The story behind name is that the girl was from Asara, Alborz province of Iran so they decided same name for new place.

== Education ==
There is around 75% (without having any degree college) literacy rate recorded in Asara, there is Muslim Inter College since 1924. There are four primary school at every corner, one Maktab and one up Govt. affiliated school including more than 20 public schools of modern education.

== See also ==
- Rataul
