= Rathaura =

Rathaura is a village situated on the Chhaprauli Qasimpur Kheri road (State Highway 57) in Baghpat District of Uttar Pradesh in India. Rathaura is well connected to the capital city, New Delhi, via rail and road transport. Baraut & Chhaprauli are the nearest towns to the village.

== Agriculture ==
Farmers in the village mostly grow sugarcane and this raw sugarcane is supplied to the sugar factory Malakpur Sugar Mills Ltd situated in the village Malakpur. The land is very fertile as the village is situated on the bank of East Yamuna Canal.

== People ==
The Village is dominated by Jat Community in which [gotra] Khokhar lives in this village. From Jangid community, people of Khairwal (gotra) and Ransiwal (gotra) also reside there. The number of voters in the village is approximately 7000–8000.
