= Baral =

Baral may refer to:

== People ==
- Baral (surname), an Indian surname

== Places ==
- Baral, Pakistan, a village in Punjab province, Pakistan
- Baral River, a distributary river of the Ganges in India
- Kishanpur baral, a village in Uttar Pradesh, India

== See also ==
- Barral, a surname
- Boral (surname), an Indian surname
- Bharali, an Indian surname
- Bharal, a species of Himalayan sheep
- Bharalu River, India
- Bharali river, India
- Bharal, India, a village in Uttar Pradesh, India
- Bharali Namghar, a religious place in Assam, India
