= Sirsalgarh =

- Village
- Location in Uttar Pradesh, India Sirsalgarh (India)
- Coordinates: 29°03′50.1″N 77°24′09.2″E
- Country: India
- State: Uttar Pradesh
- District: Baghpat
- Founded: 1920

Government
  - Body: Gram panchayat

Area
  - Total: 1.49 km^{2} (0.58 sq mi)

Population
  - Total: 6,397
  - Density: 4,290/km^{2} (11,100/sq mi)
  - Men: 3,383
  - Women: 3,014

Languages
  - Official: Hindi
- Time zone: UTC+5:30 (IST)
- PIN: 250345
- Telephone code: 91-1234 xxx xxx
- Vehicle registration: UP-17 xxxx
- Website: www.bagpat.nic.in

Sirsalgarh is a small village in Bagpat district, Uttar Pradesh, India, famous for its Garh, a hill of soil created due to earthquake a century before.

== History ==
SirsalGarh was established a century before because of an earthquake.

== Population ==
This village has 920 houses and a population of 6,397.

== Panchayat ==
Its panchayat comes under the Sirsalgarh-Darkawada Panchayat.

- District: Baghpat
- Block: BINAULI
- Gram Panchayat: SIRSALGARH DARKAVDA

== Climate ==
Climate here is warm and cool

== Geography ==
Pincode Details
Location	Pincode	State	District
Sirsalgarh	250645	Uttar Pradesh	Bagpat

SirsalGarh is one of the village of district Bagpat in Uttar Pradesh. The village is Located 25 km. in East of bank of river Yamuna at 29.096527’ North Latitude and 77.40263’ East Longitude. It is 40 km from Meerut City and 20 km. from Bagpat. In the East of this village a small town Barnawa famous from the ancient time of Mahabharata for the burning of Laksha-grah.

== Education ==
Only a single primary school is there. Despite that this small village has produced scientists, professors, teacher, doctors, officers and computer engineers.
