= Kakripur =

Village in Uttar Pradesh, India

- Village
- Interactive map of Kakripur
- Coordinates: 29°15′15.62″N 77°16′35.16″E
- Country: India
- State: Uttar Pradesh

Languages
  - Official: Hindi
- Time zone: UTC+5:30 (IST)
- PIN: 250623
- Telephone code: 01234
- Vehicle registration: UP 17
- Nearest city: Baraut
- Literacy: 88%
- Lok Sabha constituency: Baghpat
- Avg. summer temperature: 42 °C (108 °F)
- Avg. winter temperature: 03 °C (37 °F)

Kakripur is a village in Baghpat district of the Indian state of Uttar Pradesh.

Villages near Kakripur are Nala & Ailum to the north, Ramala to the south, Asara to the east and Kirthal to the west. It is located at a distance of 11;km from the river Yamuna. Kakripur On East Yamuna Canal, Vidhan Sabha Chhaprauli. Lok Sabha Baghpat Tehsil Baraut.

== Demographics of Kakripur ==
The village is chiefly inhabited by farmers who grow wheat, sugar cane and other cash crops. Demographically 97% of the population is Hindu with rest Muslim. Most of the land is owned by Jats and Dalits work primarily as labourers. The Jaats are from Panwar gotra. Hindi is the main language here. Khari boli is mostly spoken in the village.

== Transportation ==
The village is on the national Delhi-Yamunotri highway, NH 709B, connecting Delhi and Saharnpur via Baraut. Asra Halt Railway Station and the Ailam Railway Station are the nearby railway stations to Kakripur. Panipat Jn Railway Station is major railway station 36 km near to Kakripur.

== Population distribution of village Kakripur ==
The population in Kakripur village was 5,183 as per the survey of census during 2011 by Indian Government.

There are 863 House Holds in Kakripur. There are 2,878 males; There are 2,305 females.

- Kakripur Sex Ratio

While the population is 5,183, there are 2,878 males and 2,305 females are there. Further the children below 6 years of age are 607 of which 347 are males and 260 are females. Maijority Population Jaat Gotra Panwar

- Kakripur Scheduled cast and Tribes

Total Scheduled Cast are 550. Total Scheduled Tribe are 0.

- Kakripur Literacy Rate

Literates are 3,444 of which males are 2,178 and Females are 1,266. There are 1,739 Illiterates.

- Kakripur Workers Population

Workers in the State of Kakripur are calculated as 1,728 of which 1,475 are males and 253 are females. Further 1,595 are regular and 133 are Irregular i.e. get jobs only few days in a month. There are 3,455 Non Workers (include students, house wives, and children above 6 years also.)
