= Sarurpur Kalan =

Village in Uttar Pradesh, India

Coordinates: 29°02′N 77°14′E

Sarurpur Kalan, or Saroorpur Kalan, is a large village located about 10 km (6.2 mi) north of Baghpat, in Baghpat district, Uttar Pradesh state, India. It is located halfway between Baghpat and Baraut. Towns nearby include Murthal and Rai to the west, Kutana to the north, and Daula to the east. The closest airport and railway stations are Baraut Railway Station located approximately 11 km (6.8 mi) away, Sujra Railway Station located approximately 5 km (3.1 mi) away, and Indira Gandhi International Airport.

== Demographics ==
Sarurpur Kalan is a large village with a population of approximately 12,990 people as of 2011 and has an approximate voting count of 9,400. The village has a 71% literacy rate and is mostly inhabited by traders and farmers. The religious population is made up of Hindus (mainly Jats of Nain clan), Muslims and Jains. There is no reported religious disharmony within the village.

== Facilities ==
'Gufa Wala Mandir' is situated near Sarurpur. In addition to Gufa Mandir, there three Hindu temples, one Jain temple, and two mosques. There is one government inter college and multiple private schools available for primary and intermediate level studies. A B.Ed. college recognized by CCS University is also available in the village. State Bank of India (SBI), Syndicate Bank, and a post office run services available to the villagers. There is one government hospital and multiple private clinics, run mainly by BAMS and BHMS, that provide medical services.

== Economy ==
Bricks-making facilities and agriculture are the main trade of the village. There is a market in the village. There are also a considerable number of people working in the government sector including teachers, Army, Air Force, Delhi Police, and Uttar Pradesh Police.
