= Alawalpur (disambiguation) =

Alawalpur may refers to the following places:

- Alawalpur, a town in Jalandhar district, Punjab, India
- Alawalpur, Bagpat, a village in Bagpat district, Uttar Pradesh, India
- Alawalpur, Palwal, a village in Palwal district, Haryana, India
