= Baoli, Baraut =

Village in Baghpat, India

Baoli (बावली) is a village in Baraut Tehsil of District Baghpat, India. It is located 20km towards North from District headquarters Bagpat. 3 km from Baraut. 517 km from State capital Lucknow. Baoli is the largest village in Baghpat District.It was established by three brothers and was called bahubali which was later called Bhullan singh ki baoli by nearby people after independence for nearly 100 years which was shorten and called Baoli.

The village population of children with age 0-6 is 1195 which makes up 12.09% of total population of village. Average Sex Ratio of Baoli village is 825 which is lower than Uttar Pradesh state average of 912. Child Sex Ratio for the Baoli as per census is 850, lower than Uttar Pradesh average of 902.

== History ==
Dr Girish Chandra Dwivedi has mentioned in his book The Hindu Warriors: Their Role in the Mughal Empire, about historical records maintained by Khaps. A Sarva Khap Panchayat was held here in samvat 1560. Due to its proximity to Delhi, it was repeatedly attacked by Mughal armies. Since Deshkhapas (Tomar Jat) of Hindus was the biggest in western UP therefore they were clearly a big threat in the eyes of Mughals.

After the defeat of Hindu Dhahkas by the Muslim rulers of Afghanistan they came to Baghpat. It was then the ruler of Desh Khap who let the hide in their territory and Dhakas till today reside in Baghpat in the Dhikauli village. If there were no tomars then there would be no dhakas now. History tells us that Jat tomar clans of Baghpat are Descendants of Pandava. Baghpat has strong historical links with the Mahabharata cultural region. Lakshya Grah is traditionally identified with the episode of Lakshagriha described in the Mahabharata, indicating the presence of Pandava-era narratives in this region.

Baghpat is also known for the 84 villages (Chaurasi) historically associated with the Tomar Jat community, reflecting an early and well-organized rural-territorial system that existed long before the medieval period.

Archaeological excavations at Sanauli revealed chariots, copper coffins, weapons, and burial remains dated to around 2000–1800 BCE. These discoveries indicate an advanced warrior culture and are widely regarded as important evidence of the Late Harappan–Early Vedic / Mahabharata-period tradition in the Upper Ganga–Yamuna Doab.

In conclusion, Lakshya Grah traditions, the Tomar Jat Chaurasi system, and the Sanauli excavation together establish Baghpat as a historically significant region with continuity from protohistoric to early Pandava's times. The Jats are strongly considered a Pandava-related clan based on historical traditions, geographical continuity, archaeological evidence, and distinct physical–anthropological features of the Upper Ganga–Yamuna Doab region.
