= Mal Majra =

Village in Uttar Pradesh, India

Coordinates: 29°5′23″N 77°22′4″E

Mal Majra is a small Chauhan Rajput village in Bagpat district, Uttar Pradesh.

It has a government-run primary school and the CBSE-affiliated Gurkul International School. It is also home to the Neel Kanth Mahadev Aasharam, also known as the Guru Ji Aashram. There is a small canal in the village. The same gram pradhan (village leader) is responsible for Mal Majra and the nearby village of Jiwana Guliyan.

Nearby cities include Baraut, Meerut, Ghaziabad and Delhi, which is 60 km away. Mal Majra is situated 3 km away from the Baraut-Meerut Road.
