= Aminagar Sarai =

Aminagar Sarai sarai
- Town
- Location in Uttar Pradesh, India
- Coordinates: 28°59′44″N 77°23′41″E
- Country: India
- State: Uttar Pradesh
- District: Baghpat

Government
  - Type: Democracy
  - Body: Nagar Panchayat
  - Chairperson: Ujjawal Bhardwaj

Area
  - Total: 5 km^{2} (1.9 sq mi)

Population (2001)
  - Total: 10,114
  - Density: 2,000/km^{2} (5,200/sq mi)

Languages
  - Official: Hindi
- Time zone: UTC+5:30 (IST)
- PIN: 250606
- Telephone code: 0121-2234_ _ _
- Vehicle registration: UP 17
- Website: http://bagpat.nic.in/

Aminagar Sarai is a town and a nagar panchayat in Baghpat district in the state of Uttar Pradesh, India. It is the oldest town in the Meerut commissionary area.

== Demographics ==
At the 2011 India census, Aminagar Sarai had a population of 11,174 (males 53%; females 47%). It had an average literacy rate of 78.3% (58% of males; 42% of females). 16% of the population was under 7 years of age.

== Climate ==
Aminagar Sarai has a monsoon influenced humid subtropical climate characterised by hot summers and cooler winters. Summers last from early April to late June during and are extremely hot, with temperatures reaching 49 °C. The monsoon arrives in late June and continues until the middle of September. Temperatures drop slightly, with plenty of cloud cover but with higher humidity. Winters start setting in October and the town then has a mild, dry winter season from late October to the middle of March. The lowest temperature ever recorded is −0.4 °C (31.3 °F), recorded on 6 January 2013. Annual rainfall is about 845 millimetres (33.3 in), which is suitable for growing crops. Most of the rainfall is received during the monsoon. Humidity varies from 30 to 100%. The town receives no snow.

== Transport ==
=== Air ===
The nearest airport is the Indira Gandhi International Airport which is about 100 kilometres (62 mi) away.

=== Road ===
By road, Aminagar Sarai is well-connected. It is 3 kilometres (1.9 mi) off NH 334B (Baghpat-Meerut Highway). A few buses, shared 3-wheelers, e-ricksaws and paddle rickshaws ply from the main road to the town.

There are two main bus terminals, Binuali Stand and Roadways Stand, from where private buses and Uttar Pradesh State Road Transport Corporation buses ply to all nearby villages and cities.

=== Railways ===
The nearest railway stations are at Baraut and Baghpat Road railway stations.
