= Barnava =

- Village
- Location in Uttar Pradesh, India Barnava (India)
- Coordinates: 29°06′54″N 77°25′43″E
- Country: India
- State: Uttar Pradesh
- District: Bagpat

Government
  - Body: Gram panchayat

Languages
  - Official: Hindi
- Time zone: UTC+5:30 (IST)

Barnava is a village located in the Bagpat district of Uttar Pradesh, India. It is located between Sardhana and Binauli near Meerut. It is about 3 km from Binauli and 37 km from Meerut. In the Mahabharata, Baranava is mentioned as Varanāvata and is the site of the Lakshagraha. Many believe that Barnava still has evidence of Lakshagraha.

A Jain temple known as Chandraprabha Digamber Jain Atishya Kshetra Barnava Jain Mandir is also situated in Barnava Village. A lotus temple similar to the one found in New Delhi is within the Barnava Jain Temple premises. The main gate is intricately designed and is noted for its exquisite carvings.

This was pargana in princely state of Sardhana. Nowadays this is a Muslim majority Qasba. The estimated population is this 12000.

The word Barnava is derived from the Baranwal community.

== Barnava Jain Temple ==
Barnava Jain Temple is more than 100 years old. The temple is dedicated to Chandraprabha, the eighth Tirthankara of Jainism. An idol of Mallinatha is also present in this temple which is believed to be around 1,300 years old. The aura surrounding the temple is calm and mystical. The temple was renovated in 1917 by Seth Lalmann Das.
