= Kheriki =

Baghpat district village

- Village
- Location within Uttar Pradesh Location within India
- Coordinates: 29°02′11″N 77°14′18″E
- Country: India
- State: Uttar Pradesh
- District: Baghpat

Population (2011)
  - Total: 2,707

Kheriki (also spelled Kherki) is a village in the Baghpat tehsil of Baghpat district in the Indian state of Uttar Pradesh. The village is administrated by a Gram Panchayat. According to the 2011 Census of India, Kheriki had a population of 2,707.

== Geography ==
Kherki is located in the fertile plains of western Uttar Pradesh. The village has agricultural fields and a notable village pond that serves as a local water source. Nearby villages include Tyodhi and Sarurpur Kalan. The village is accessible via paved roads and is connected to regional highways that link it with Baghpat and other nearby towns.

== Demographics ==
The main languages spoken in Kheriki are Hindi and Khadi Boli. The majority of residents belong to the Hindu community, with Brahmins/Pandits being one of the prominent castes. As of 2011, the village had a total population of 2,707 people.

== Administration ==
Kheriki is governed by a Gram Panchayat. The village has a local Pradhan (village head), who oversees administrative functions and local development projects.

== Economy ==
The economy of Kherki is primarily based on agriculture, dairy, and small businesses. Major crops depend on the season, and many villagers also run small shops to supplement their income.

== Culture and traditions ==
Kherki has a mixed culture with residents celebrating local festivals in accordance with Hindu traditions. There is a village temple that serves as a spiritual center. No large fairs or festivals are reported in official sources.

== Transport ==
The village is connected by paved roads and is near a bus stand called Kherki Bus Point. Regional highways provide access to Baghpat and surrounding towns.

== Education ==
The village has a government primary school, and a nearby college is located within Kherki. Education is accessible for local residents, with students also traveling to Baghpat for higher studies.

== News coverage ==
Kheriki has been featured in regional and national news for some notable local events.

- **NDTV (1 August 2019)** – A video from Kheriki went viral when a man celebrated his birthday in an unusual manner by cutting his cake using a firearm. This incident was widely reported and highlighted the local customs and social practices in the village.
- **Amar Ujala (8 August 2023)** – Kheriki became the first village in the Baghpat district where cameras were installed at every intersection and road as part of a local safety and monitoring initiative. This project was highlighted for improving security and traffic management within the village.
