= Bharal, India =

Bharal, India Bharal Bhadal
- Village
- Location in Uttar Pradesh, India Bharal, India (India)
- Coordinates: 29°06′54″N 77°25′43″E
- Country: India
- State: Uttar Pradesh
- District: Bagpat

Government
  - Body: Gram panchayat

Population
  - Total: 6,000

Languages
  - Official: Hindi
- Time zone: UTC+5:30 (IST)
- Vehicle registration: UP 17
- Website: up.gov.in

Bharal is a village in Bagpat district in Uttar Pradesh, India. It has a population of around 10,000. The Pin code of the area is 250622. Near by police station is in Doghat. This village is one of four villages group called Chaugama. Other villages are Daha, Nirpura and Gahandpura or Gaidabra. Rana Jats dominate the village.
