= Gopalpur Khadana =

- Village
- Location in Uttar Pradesh, India Gopalpur Khadana (India)
- Coordinates: 29.2144°N 77.3162°E
- Country: India
- State: Uttar Pradesh
- District: Baghpat
- Subdistrict: Baraut
- Elevation: 233 m (764 ft)

Population
  - Total: 875

Languages
- Hindi
- Time zone: UTC+05:30 (IST)
- Pincode: 250623
- Telephone code: 01234

Gopalpur Khadana is a village in Baraut tehsil, Baghpat district, Uttar Pradesh, India. The village is administrated by a Sarpanch (Head of Village) who is an elected representative.

== Speciality ==
A famous temple NIMBAR WALA is near GOPALPUR KHADANA. It is located on the bank of Krishna river, which is a tributary of Hindon river. It is surrounded on two sides by the river Krishna. Now-a-days, Krishna river acts as drainage for sugar mills, located nearby and polluting ground water table of the area. People of this village are, predominantly, farmers, principally growing sugarcane as cash crop. At Holi villagers play Tilhendi [Next day of Dulhendi]. They enjoy this festival with water. They Dance, and play music.

== Population ==
The population of Gopalpur Khadana was 873, of which 506 were male and 367 female, at the time of the 2011 Census of India. Children aged 0-6 numbered 108, being 12.37% of the total population. The Average Sex Ratio was 725, which was lower than the Uttar Pradesh state average of 912. The Child Sex Ratio was 800, lower than the Uttar Pradesh average of 902.

At that time, Gopalpur Khadana had a higher literacy rate than the state average, being 72.81% compared to 67.68%. Male literacy was 85.20% and the female literacy rate was 55.49%.

Schedule Castes (SC) constituted 8.71% of the population; there were no members of Schedule Tribes.

== Occupations ==
In Gopalpur Khadana village out of total population, 299 were engaged in work activities. 95.99% of workers describe their work as Main Work (Employment or Earning more than 6 Months) while 4.01% were involved in Marginal activity providing livelihood for less than 6 months. Of 299 workers engaged in Main Work, 126 were cultivators (owner or co-owner) while 115 were Agricultural labourer. Most of the villagers own land and are marginal farmers.
