= Lokesh Dixit =

Indian politician

Lokesh Dixit लोकेश दीक्षित

MLA, 16th Legislative Assembly
- In office Mar 2012 – Mar 2017
- Preceded by: Vikram Singh (05th Vidhan Sabha
- Succeeded by: Krishan Pal Malik
- Constituency: Baraut

Personal details
- Born: 22 November 1965 (age 60) Baghpat district, Uttar Pradesh
- Party: Bahujan Samaj Party
- Spouse: Madhu Dixit (wife)
- Children: 2 sons
- Parent: Gopal Dixit (father)
- Education: National Institute of Open Schooling
- Profession: Farmer & politician

Lokesh Dixit (Hindi: लोकेश दीक्षित) is an Indian politician and a member of the 16th Legislative Assembly of Uttar Pradesh of India. He represents the Baraut constituency of Uttar Pradesh and is a member of the Bahujan Samaj Party political party.

== Early life and education ==
Lokesh Dixit was born in Village Gyasri urf Gaadhi, Baghpat district, Uttar Pradesh. He attended the National Institute of Open Schooling and is educated till tenth grade degree.

== Political career ==
Lokesh Dixit has been a MLA for one term. He represented the Baraut constituency and is a member of the Bahujan Samaj Party political party.

== Posts held ==
#	From	To	Position	Comments
01	2012	Incumbent	Member, 16th Legislative Assembly	

== See also ==
- Baraut
- Sixteenth Legislative Assembly of Uttar Pradesh
- Uttar Pradesh Legislative Assembly
