= Mahavatpur =

Village in Uttar Pradesh, India

Mahavatpur is the part of village Baoli near Baraut, District Bagpat Uttar Pradesh, India. It is the largest village of west Uttar Pradesh. It has ten schools and four temples. Mahavatpur is a completely Hindu village. Many of the residents of the village work for the Indian government, including the Indian Army and Indian Air Force. Many persons are serving in USA.
