= Baghpat Road railway station =

Railway station in Uttar Pradesh, India

- Indian Railways logo

General information
- Location: Baghpat, Uttar Pradesh; India
- Coordinates: 28.9573°N 77.2722°E
- Elevation: 229 metres (751 ft)
- System: Indian Railways station
- Owner: Indian Railways
- Operator: Northern Railway
- Platforms: 2
- Tracks: 4 (single electric BG)
- Connections: Auto stand

Construction
- Structure type: Standard (on-ground station)
- Parking: Yes
- Cycle facilities: No

Other information
- Status: Functioning
- Station code: BPM
- Zone(s): Northern Railway
- Division(s): Delhi

History
- Rebuilt: 2022
Location
- Location within India Location within Uttar Pradesh

Baghpat Road railway station is a small railway station in Baghpat district, Uttar Pradesh, India. Its code is BPM. It serves Baghpat city. The station consists of two platforms. The platforms are well sheltered. It provides many basic facilities including food, water and sanitation.

== Major trains ==
Some of the important trains that runs from Baghpat Road are:

- Saharanpur–Farukhnagar Janta Express
- Old Delhi–Haridwar Passenger
- Delhi–Saharanpur Passenger
- Shamli–Delhi Passenger
