= Nagla Rawa =

Nangla Rawa
- Interactive map of Nangla Rawa
- Coordinates: 29.04°N 77.35°E
- Country: India
- State: Uttar Pradesh
- District: Baghpat district
- Elevation: 223 m (732 ft)

Population (2011)
  - Total: 1,531

Languages
  - Official: Hindi
- Time zone: UTC+5:30 (IST)
- Website: up.gov.in

Nangla Rawa is a village in Baraut Tahsil and Baghpat in the Indian State of Uttar Pradesh. It is 26 km from Bagpat.

== Geography ==
Nagla Rawa is located at 29.04°N 77.35°E. It has an average elevation of 223 metres (731 feet). Baraut is Nearest Railway Station, just 11 km away from Nangla Rawa.

== Demographics ==
According to the 2011 census Nagla Rawa had a population of 1,531, out of which males were 830 and females were 701. Nagla Rawa has an average literacy rate of 75.45%, Male literacy is 87.57%, and female literacy is 61.08%. In Nagla Rawa.
