= Chamrawal =

Village in Uttar Pradesh, India

Coordinates: 28.8753293°N 77.3871657°E

Chamrawal is a village in Bagpat district, Uttar Pradesh, India. Chamrawal is located at a distance of 6.556 km from Pilana town, and 16.25 km from Baghpat town.

== History ==
It is to be said that Chamrawal village was discovered by Chaman rishi in the year 707 AD.

The land for the air force firing range was acquired prior to 1908, and the resultant oustees now living in Chamrawal are mostly of the Tyagi Brahmin community.

Chamrawal was once in Meerut district, but became a part of Baghpat district upon its creation.

== Geography ==
The PIN code of the village is 250515. Other villages in the same postal zone include Pilana, Hisawada, Lalyana and Khatta Prahladpur. Other nearby villages include Mansoorpur (1.7 km), Lalyana (2.5 km), Panchi (2.6 km), Kaharka (3.1 km), Khaila (3.1 km), Dhikoli (3.2 km) and Lahchauda (3.6 km).

== Administration ==
The village pradhan is Pradeep Tyagi. The police station is in Chamrawal Chandinagar.

== Demographics ==
According to the 2011 Indian census, Chamrawal village has a population of 4,523 (707 families, 2619 males, 1904 females, 601 children aged six and under), with a literacy rate of 81.74% (90.36% for males, 69.63% for females), which compares well to the average literacy rate of 67.68% for all of Uttar Pradesh.

The village is inhabited mainly by the Tyagi community.

== Religious shrines ==
It has a Hanuman temple named Sankat Mochan Hanuman Mandir. It was built in 2007.

It has a Shiv Shakti temple situated on the Hindon River.
