= Bijrol =

Village in Uttar Pradesh, India

- Village
- Interactive map of Bijrol
- Coordinates: 29.7°N 77.18°E
- Country: India
- State: Uttar Pradesh
- District: Baghpat
- Elevation: 230 m (750 ft)

Population
  - Total: 11,000+
- Approximate

Bijrol is a village located in Baghpat District of Uttar Pradesh, India.

Having a population of more than eleven thousand this village is 6 km from Baraut the sub district of Baghpat. Visitors here visit to see the Ashoka Pillar.

== Geography ==
Bijrol is located at 29.7°N 77.18°E. It has an average elevation of 230 metres (750 ft).

== Notables ==
- Sah Mal, a fighter against the British during the 1857 war
- Gourav Sharma, Dy. Commandant in BSF
- Puja Tomar, India's first UFC champion
