= Luhara =

Sherpur Luhara Sherpur Luhara
- Village
- Location of Luhara in Baghpat, Uttar Pradesh, India Sherpur Luhara (India)
- Coordinates: 29°10′00″N 77°13′00″E
- Country: India
- State: Uttar Pradesh

Government
  - Body: Gram panchayat
- Elevation: 248 m (814 ft)

Population (2011)
  - Total: 9,000

Languages
  - Official: Hindi,
- Time zone: UTC+5:30 (IST)
- PIN: 250617
- Telephone code: 01234
- Sex ratio: 1000:910 ♂/♀

Sherpur Luhara is a village in the Chhaprauli constituency of the Uttar Pradesh Legislative Assembly. It is located in the Baghpat district of Uttar Pradesh, India. It is famous for the Banasura temple in the heart of village. It is sometimes called "Sherpur Luhara". Sherpur is nearby village of Luhara. It falls under the tehsil of Baraut.

== Geography ==
It is located at 10 km from Baraut, 60 km from Delhi, the National Capital via NH-57, and 45 km from the district "Shamli". Luhara is in the "Baghpat" district, and is situated 30 km from district headquarters "Baghpat".
