= Saand Ki Aankh =

2019 Indian Hindi-language biographical film

- Theatrical release poster
- Directed by: Tushar Hiranandani
- Written by: Jagdeep Sidhu (dialogue)
- Screenplay by: Balwinder Singh Janjua
- Produced by: Anurag Kashyap; Reliance Entertainment; Nidhi Parmar
- Starring: Taapsee Pannu; Bhumi Pednekar; Prakash Jha; Vineet Kumar Singh
- Narrated by: Sara Arjun
- Cinematography: Sudhakar Reddy Yakkanti
- Edited by: Devendra Murdeshwar
- Music by: Songs: Vishal Mishra; Score: Advait Nemlekar
- Production companies: Reliance Entertainment; Chalk and Cheese Films
- Distributed by: Reliance Entertainment; PVR Pictures
- Release date: 25 October 2019
- Running time: 146 minutes
- Country: India
- Language: Hindi
- Box office: est. ₹30.7 crore

Saand Ki Aankh (transl. Bull's eye) is a 2019 Indian biographical drama film directed by Tushar Hiranandani and produced by Anurag Kashyap, Reliance Entertainment and Nidhi Parmar. The film stars Taapsee Pannu, Bhumi Pednekar, Prakash Jha, and Vineet Kumar Singh. It highlights the lives of sharpshooters Chandro and Prakashi Tomar.

Filming began in February 2019 at Baghpat, with principal photography also held in Hastinapur and Mawana. The film was released on 25 October 2019, coinciding with the Diwali festival.

== Cast ==
- Taapsee Pannu as Prakashi Tomar
- Bhumi Pednekar as Chandro Tomar
- Prakash Jha as Rattan Singh Tomar
- Kuldeep Sareen as Bhanwan Singh Tomar
- Pawan Chopra as Jai Singh Tomar
- Vineet Kumar Singh as Dr. Yashpal
- Yudhvir Ahlawat as Young Rambir Tomar
- Yogendra Vikram Singh as young Rattan Singh Tomar
- Ronak Bhinder as young Bhanwar Singh Tomar
- Amol Nikhare as Young Jai Singh Tomar
- Navneet Srivastava as Farooq
- Shaad Randhawa as Rambir Tomar
- Pritha Bakshi as Seema Tomar
- Sara Arjun as Shefali Tomar
- Himanshu Sharma as Sachin Tomar
- Kavita Vaid as Bimla Tomar (Prakashi Tomar and Chandro Tomar's sister-in-law)
- Akshay Kumar Jinagal as captain
- Trupti Khamkhar as young Bimla Tomar
- Sandeep Sharma as Reporter
- Nikhat Khan as Maharani Mahedra Kumari
- Dinesh Mohan as Maharaja of Alwar

== Production ==
=== Development and casting ===
Initially the film was titled Womaniya with Taapsee Pannu and Bhumi Pednekar in lead roles. But due to controversy over legal rights of the title which is held by Pritish Nandy Communications, the film was renamed as Saand Ki Aankh. Later on Prakash Jha was also included in the cast to play a vital role. In the last week of February 2019, Vineet Kumar Singh was added to the cast. Giving details of the film, the co producer Anurag Kashyap stated that the film is a biopic based on the life of the oldest sharpshooters, Chandro Tomar and her sister-in-law Prakashi Tomar.

=== Filming ===
Filming began on 10 February 2019 in Baghpat. The second part of the film is to be shot in Hastinapur and Mawana. Pannu trained in air pistol and rifle shooting to reprise the role of a sharpshooter in the film. The filming was completed in the last week of April as Pannu shared the news on social media.

== Promotion and release ==
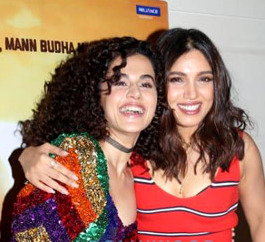
Pannu and Pednekar at an event of the film

On 14 February 2019, the lead actors shared the first look of the film from location. Giving wishes on Holi festival, Pannu shared another look from the film on Twitter on 21 March 2019. A short video introducing Chandro and Prakashi Tomar, on whose life the film is based was released by Reliance Entertainment on 14 April 2019 on YouTube. First look posters of the film were released on 16 April 2019. In the posters, Pannu and Bhumi are posing with their pistols. The poster gives the release date as Diwali.

The film was theatrically released on 25 October 2019. It was screened as opening film at 51st International Film Festival of India in January 2021 in Indian Panorama section.

== Soundtrack ==
Saand Ki Aankh

Soundtrack album by Vishal Mishra
- Released: 15 October 2019
- Recorded: 2019
- Studio: YRF Studios
- Genre: Feature film soundtrack
- Length: 36:16
- Label: Zee Music Company
- Producer: Gaurav Vaswani

Vishal Mishra chronology
Pranaam (2019)	Saand Ki Aankh (2019)	Street Dancer (2020)
External audio
- Official Audio Jukebox on YouTube

The music of the film is composed by Vishal Mishra, with lyrics written by Raj Shekhar.

Track listing
No.	Title	Singer(s)	Length
1.	"Udta Teetar"	Sunidhi Chauhan, Jyoti Nooran	4:30
2.	"Womaniya"	Vishal Dadlani, Vishal Mishra	3:54
3.	"Aasmaa"	Asha Bhosle	6:09
4.	"Baby Gold"	Sona Mohapatra, Jyotica Tangri	3:35
5.	"Jhunna Jhunna"	Pratibha Singh Baghel, Krutika Borkar	4:11
6.	"Womaniya" (Raw Version)	Vishal Mishra	3:54
7.	"Aasmaa" (Studio Version)	Vishal Mishra	6:09
8.	"Womaniya" (Film Version)	Palak Muchhal	3:54
Total length:			36:16

== Reception ==
=== Critical response ===
On review aggregator website Rotten Tomatoes, the film holds a rating of 56% based on 16 reviews with an average rating of 6/10.

Priyanka Sinha Jha of News18, praising Taapsee Pannu and Bhumi Pednekar for their 'endearing' performances, rates the film with three and half stars out of five. She writes, "What sets apart Saand Ki Aankh is that director Tushar Hiranandani frames the issues of patriarchy and gender discrimination within the structure of a family drama which is heart-wrenching and triumphant in equal measure." Concluding, she opined, that the simple storytelling, with good background score and suitable production design the film has hit the bullseye. Sonal Gera of India TV gave three and half stars out of five and noted that Saand Ki Aankh is a 'compelling feminist statement'. Criticising make-up and prosthetics used on Taapsee and Bhumi she felt that they looked too young to be 60-year-olds. Nevertheless, praising the performance of Pannu, Pednekar and Prakash Jha, she concluded, "The films needs to be watched but for powerful performances by inarguably two of the best actresses of recent times, Prakash Jha's baddie, an inspiring narrative and for the sheer joy of watching a good female-centric movie". Mike McCahill of The Guardian gave two stars out of five and concluded "This feels like a waste of rich narrative possibilities, as mechanically feelgood as those two dozen Britflicks that have cast Dames Dench, Smith et al as old dears who shoot from the lip".

=== Box office ===
Saand Ki Aankh's opening day domestic collection was ₹48 lakhs. On the second day, the film collected ₹1.08 crore. On the third day, the film collected ₹91 lakhs, taking total opening weekend collection to ₹2.47 crore.

As of 30 December 2019, with a gross of ₹27.86 crore in India and ₹2.84 crore overseas, the film has a worldwide gross collection of ₹30.7 crore.

=== Awards and nominations ===
List of awards and nominations
Award	Date of ceremony	Category	Recipient(s)	Result	Ref(s)
Filmfare Awards	15 February 2020	Best Debut Director	Tushar Hiranandani	Nominated	
Filmfare Awards	15 February 2020	Best Screenplay	Balwinder Singh Janjua	Nominated	
Filmfare Awards	15 February 2020	Critics Award for Best Actress	Bhumi Pednekar	Won	
Filmfare Awards	15 February 2020	Critics Award for Best Actress	Taapsee Pannu	Won	
Filmfare Awards	15 February 2020	Best Playback Singer-Female	Sona Mohapatra and Jyotica Tangri for "Baby Gold"	Nominated	
Filmfare Awards	15 February 2020	Best Sound Design	Pritam Das	Nominated	
Star Screen Awards	8 December 2019	Critics Award for Best Actress	Bhumi Pednekar	Won	
Star Screen Awards	8 December 2019	Critics Award for Best Actress	Taapsee Pannu	Won	
