= Katha, Bagpat =

Katha
- Village
- Location in Uttar Pradesh, India Katha (India)
- Coordinates: 28.8991398°N 77.2389937°E
- Country: India
- State: Uttar Pradesh
- District: Baghpat
- Tehsil: Khekada

Government
  - Type: Panchayati raj (India)
  - Body: Gram panchayat

Area
  - Total: 12.37 km^{2} (4.78 sq mi)

Languages
  - Official: Hindi
- Time zone: UTC+5:30 (IST)
- Pin code: 250101
- Telephone code: 01234
- Website: up.gov.in

Katha is a village in the Bagpat district of Uttar Pradesh, India. It is situated on the left bank of the Saharanpur Road. From Loni, it is about 16 km (9.9 mi). Katha is on the right side of the Shahdara-Saharanpur Road. The village is situated entirely on a huge mound, whose length is about 200 metres (660 ft), breadth is 100 metres (330 ft) and the height is about 16 to 18 metres (52 to 59 ft).

== History ==
Local oral histories say that Katha was once a fort from where a king called Raja Ror ruled. He was a cruel ruler, and thus God turned the village upside down, leading to it being called a palta-hua- khera.

According to the villagers, on the present border of the village (a relatively new village called Pali occupies the border area of Katha village) there was a chabutara (platform) made of grey sandstone. Flowers and human figures were built on these stones. These were a part of the Shiva temple, which is still present. However, these figures are defaced, breasts of female were cut and even the Shiv linga of the Shiv temple is cut from a side. Some stone structural remains of the erstwhile temple complex were also noticed. The destruction of the temple appears to happen when Timur attacked the village when coming from Mudula, which may be identified with the present village of Mandaula.

The villagers also informed that on the border of the village there was a well surrounded by house-complexes from all sides. From one side, there was a steep ascent from where animals could come within this structural complex and drink water. The well had several drains. There was also a cave and its other end used to open in the fort of Raja Ror. According to the villagers, this complex was made for Raja Ror's daughter to bathe in. However, now there are no remains of this structural complex, except a very small pond and a couple of scattered structural remains.
