= Shirash Pal Singh =

Indian kabaddi player

Squadron Leader Shirash Pal Singh was the coach of the Indian National kabaddi team. He was born in the village of Bandpur of Khekra tehsil in Baghpat district, India. He played kabaddi throughout high school, college, and at national level.

== Career ==
He joined the Indian Air Force, where he excelled as an officer cadet, receiving the President's Plaque for achievement whilst at the Air Force Academy. He obtained a diploma in coaching kabaddi & kho kho from the National Institute of Sports and became the coach of the Services national team, later moving on to become coach of the Indian national kabaddi team.

Under his coaching the Indian national team won a gold medal in the 1995 SAF Games and another in the 13th Asian Games in Bangkok in 1998.

He was presented with an award for this success by the Prime Minister of India Atal Bihari Vajpayee at the Vigyan Bhavan. He retired from coaching the Indian kabaddi team just before the 1999 SAF games in Kathmandu.

Singh sought to bring kabaddi up to the same level of professionalism as other international sports, campaigning for use of artificial surfaces and modern equipment.
