= Barral =

Barral is both a given name and a surname.

Notable people with the given name include:

- Barral of Marseille (died 1192), Viscount of Marseille
- Barral of Baux (died 1268), Viscount of Marseille and Lord of Baux

Notable people with the surname include:

- Carlos Barral (1928–1989), Spanish poet
- David Barral (born 1983), Spanish footballer
- Émile Barral (1891 1961), Monegasque sailor
- Javi Barral (born 1981), Spanish footballer
- Joe Barral (born 1945), Monegasque sports shooter
- Louis Barral (1910–1999), Monégasque lexicographer
- Luigi Barral (1907–1962), Italian cyclist
- Rolando Barral (1939–2002), Cuban actor, television presenter and radio host
- Romulo Barral (born 1983), Brazilian jiu-jitsu

== See also ==
- Baral (disambiguation)
- Éditions Xavier Barral, is a French book publisher
- Luísa Margarida de Barros Portugal, Countess of Barral (1816–1891), was Brazilian noble and courtier
