= Chandro Tomar =

Indian sport shooter (1932–2021)

- Born: 10 January 1932; Shamli, Uttar Pradesh, India
- Died: 30 April 2021 (aged 89); Meerut, Uttar Pradesh, India
- Other name: Shooter Dadi (Shooter Grandma)
- Occupation: Sharpshooter
- Sports career
- Country: India
- Updated on 02 May 2021

Chandro Tomar (10 January 1932 – 30 April 2021) was an Indian octogenarian sharpshooter from the village of Johri in the Bagpat district in the Indian state of Uttar Pradesh.

Since learning to shoot in 1999 when she was already in her 60s, she had attained national fame as an accomplished shooter, having won more than 30 national championships. She was referred to as the oldest (woman) sharpshooter in the world and a "feminist icon." The Uttar Pradesh government renamed the Noida Shooting Range and a road of her village after her name later.

== Biography ==
Tomar never attended school and married at age 15. She has five children and twelve grandchildren. She began learning to shoot by chance, when her granddaughter Shefali wanted to learn how to shoot at Johri Rifle Club. Her granddaughter was shy to go alone to an all-boys shooting club, and wanted her grandmother to accompany her. At the range, Tomar took a pistol when her granddaughter could not load it and she started shooting at a target. Her first shot resulted in a bull's eye hit. The club coach, Farooq Pathan, was surprised to see her shoot so skillfully. He suggested she join the club and get trained to become a shooter, which Tomar did. Her trainer commented: "She has the ultimate skill, a steady hand and a sharp eye."

Tomar was over age 65 when she began her sharpshooting career, and was derided and laughed at when she first began attending professional competitions. Tomar recalled her husband and his brothers at first being angry and opposed to her participation in competitions, but she decided to continue. Her daughter and granddaughter joined the shooting team, and Tomar encouraged other families to allow their daughters to join. From 1999 on, Tomar competed in and won over 25 state and larger championships throughout India. She won a gold medal at the Veteran Shooting Championship conducted in Chennai. Her success has encouraged the local people to take up shooting as a useful sporting profession, including her granddaughters.

In 2021, Tomar told The New York Times that her strength and agility is from "All the household chores I used to do from a young age, like grinding the wheat by hand, milking the cows, cutting the grass, It's important to stay active. Your body might grow old, but keep your mind sharp."

Her niece Seema Tomar, also a sharpshooter, was the first Indian woman to win a medal at the Rifle and Pistol World Cup in 2010. Her granddaughter, Shefali Tomar, achieved international shooter status and has taken part in international competitions in Hungary and Germany; both of them credit Tomar for the positive encouragement provided and praised her sister in law Prakashi Tomar for advising them.

Tomar died from COVID-19 on 30 April 2021, at the age of 89.

== In popular culture ==
- Saand Ki Aankh (2019) — a biopic movie starring Taapsee Pannu and Bhumi Pednekar.

== See also ==
- Prakashi Tomar, the second-oldest female shooter from the same village
