= Krishnapal Malik =

Indian politician

Krishan Pal Malik

Member of the Uttar Pradesh Legislative Assembly
- Incumbent
- Assumed office March 2017
- Preceded by: Lokesh Dikshit
- Constituency: Baraut

Member of the Uttar Pradesh Legislative Council
- In office 2006–2012

Personal details
- Born: 1 November 1957 (age 68)

MLA Krishnapal Malik (born 8 September 1960) is an Indian politician and the MLA of Baraut, Uttar Pradesh from Bharatiya Janata Party. He has assets which value around 11 crores and by profession he is in to agriculture and business.
