= Doghat =

- Town
- Location in Uttar Pradesh, India Doghat (India)
- Coordinates: 29°12′49″N 77°22′22″E
- Country: India
- State: Uttar Pradesh
- District: Baghpat

Languages
  - Official: Hindi
- Time zone: UTC+5:30 (IST)
- Website: perfectfelsystem.cpm

Doghat is a town and a Nagar Panchayat in Baghpat district in the state of Uttar Pradesh, India.

== Demographics ==
As of the 2011 India census, Doghat had a population (voters) of 17,261. Males constitute 54% of the population and females 46%. Doghat has an average literacy rate of 57%, lower than the national average of 59.5%: male literacy is 67% and female literacy is 44%. 16% of the population is under 6 years of age.

== Nagar Panchayat ==
The township Doghat is located in the National Capital Region (NCR). The Nagar Panchayat has a chairman who is elected by the people of the town. The town is situated 61 km from the national capital Delhi, 51 km from Sonipat, 61 km from Panipat and 58 km from Meerut. It has a police station, post office, government health center, senior secondary school (Gandhi Smarak Inter College), and two banks. The town is a marketing hub for the nearby villages. This part of Western Uttar Pradesh has a distinct culture owing to its geographical location. The nearest airport is Indira Gandhi international airport, Delhi (70 km). The Doghat Police Station is also situated in this town.
