= Binauli =

- Town
- Location in Uttar Pradesh, India Binauli (India)
- Coordinates: 29°05′39″N 77°24′3″E
- Country: India
- State: Uttar Pradesh
- District: Baghpat
  - Density: 6,346/km^{2} (16,440/sq mi)

Languages
  - Official: Hindi
- Time zone: UTC+5:30 (IST)
- PIN: 250345
- Telephone code: +91- 01234-XXXX
- Vehicle registration: UP-17

Binauli is a small town in Baghpat district in Uttar Pradesh, India. Binauli is between Baraut and Barnava on Meerut road. Binauli is a religious Village, with Hindu majority and also many people believe in Jainism. Majority of the Hindus belongs to Scheduled Caste. About one-fifth population follows Islam. It is under NCR PLAN. It has one block, with one Police Station, now it is a Kotwali, Government Hospital, and a post office. Binauli is about 13 km from Baraut, 42 km from Meerut and 70 km from Delhi.

== Climate ==
The climate of Binauli is warm and cool.

== Economy ==
Binauli is laced with such facilities as a market, petrol pump, Thana (Police Station), Banks, pani ki tanki (Water Tank) etc. The villagers from the neighboring villages throng its market for buying daily necessities. There are total 4 main Government banks:

- State Bank of India (SBI)
- Punjab National Bank (PNB)
- Canara Bank

== Education ==
There is one Government senior secondary school (Sarva Hitkari Inter College Binauli, Baghpat). This school has a great importance for all the people of Binauli, SirsalGarh, Galahita, GarhiDulla, SheikhPura, Dadri and other neighbour village of Binauli. Apart from this there are many other private schools. There are two government primary schools and one separate school for middle classes.

== Occupation ==
Occupation of the people of Binauli is mostly Agriculture. Approximately 70% people are dependent upon agriculture. Main crops of Binauli are sugarcane, wheat and rice. Also vegetables like Gourds, Pumpkins, Potatoes, Ladyfinger, Spinach, Radish and Carrots are also grown.

== Infrastructure ==
There is a Government Hospital, a Panchayat Bhawan, a Sabji Mandi, a Police Kotwali, Police Chowki and a post office. It is a BLOCK city, near about 70 village under this block.
