= Kishanpur baral =

Village in Uttar Pradesh, India

Coordinates: 29°12′N 77°17′E

Kishanpur Baral is a village in Baghpat district, Uttar Pradesh, India. Kishanpur Baral is situated on the Delhi-Saharanpur Yamunotri Highway. This village is about 60 km from the New Delhi and also 60 km from Meerut. It is about 30 km from Bagpat.

== Economy ==
The village is mainly agriculture based. Sugarcane is the main commercial crop.

== Education ==
Education has been compulsory in this village since the time of the British administration. There are many schools and colleges. DAV Inter College is the oldest one.
