= Baral, Pakistan =

Pakistani village

Coordinates: 32°55′43″N 73°43′53″E

BARAL (Barla) بڑل
- City
- Interactive map of BARAL (Barla) بڑل
- Country: Pakistan
- Province: Punjab
- District: Jhelum

Area
  - Total: 22.5 km^{2} (8.7 sq mi)
- Elevation: 233 m (764 ft)

Population (1998)
  - Total: 145,847
  - Density: 6,480/km^{2} (16,800/sq mi)
- Time zone: UTC+5 (PKT)
- Postal code: 49600 (Jhelum)
- Dialling code: (0544)639

Baral /ˈdʒeɪləm/ (Urdu, Punjabi: بڑل) is a village on the bank of the Jhelum River, near Pandori in the district of Jhelum in the north of Punjab province, Pakistan. Baral Village is sharing boundary with Mangla Cantonment (also refers as Baral Cantt). It is about 28 km away from Jhelum and 12 km from Dina City.
