= Looop Lapeta =

2022 Indian film by Aakash Bhatia

- Official release poster
- Directed by: Aakash Bhatia
- Written by: Dr. Vinay Chhawal; Ketan Pedgaonkar; Aakash Bhatia; Arnav Vepa Nanduri
- Based on: Run Lola Run by Tom Tykwer
- Produced by: Tanuj Garg; Atul Kasbekar; Aayush Maheshwari
- Starring: Taapsee Pannu; Tahir Raj Bhasin
- Cinematography: Yash Khanna
- Edited by: Priyank Prem Kumar
- Music by: Rahul Pais; Nariman Khambata
- Production companies: Sony Pictures Films India; Ellipsis Entertainment
- Distributed by: Netflix
- Release date: 4 February 2022
- Running time: 131 minutes
- Country: India
- Language: Hindi

Looop Lapeta is a 2022 Indian Hindi-language comedy-thriller film directed by Aakash Bhatia and jointly produced by Sony Pictures Films India, Ellipsis Entertainment and Aayush Maheshwari. An official adaptation of the award-winning German film Run Lola Run by Tom Tykwer, the film stars Taapsee Pannu and Tahir Raj Bhasin in the lead roles. The film premiered on 4 February 2022 on Netflix.

At the 2022 Filmfare OTT Awards, Looop Lapeta received 3 nominations, including Best Web Original Film and Best Supporting Actress in a Web Original Film (Shreya Dhanwanthary), and won Best Actress in a Web Original Film (Pannu).

== Plot ==
Savina "Savi" Borkar is a promising track-and-field athlete whose career is ruined by a knee injury. While recovering from surgery, she decides to commit suicide, only to be stopped by Satyajeet "Satya", a small-time crook. They fall in love and begin a relationship, which her father Atul disapproves of. One day, Satya is tasked by his boss Victor to deliver a package (implied to be a narcotics consignment) to an address and collect ₹ 5,000,000. Satya delivers the package and collects the cash, but decides to gamble it, so he can return Victor's share and keep the winnings for himself. While on his way to a casino, he gets high with a stranger and loses cash on a bus. Realizing his life is in danger if he does not return Victor's money, Satya calls Savi in a panic. Savi, who has just found out that sh i's pregnant, decides to ask Atul for the money.

On her way to Atul's gym, Savi interacts with Jacob, a cab driver whose girlfriend Julia is marrying another man. Jacob refuses to drive Savi, so she vandalizes his cab, attracting the attention of policeman David. Savi asks Atul for money, but they get into an argument as Atul was her coach and their relationship soured after Savi's injury. Savi blames Atul for dating a man after her mother's death. The two cannot reconcile and Savi leaves empty-handed. David spots her and gives chase but she evades him by hiding at Julia's wedding. Meanwhile, bumbling brothers Appu and Gappu plan to rob their father Mamlesh's jewelry store. Satya arrives at the store with the same idea, and a standoff ensues. Savi distracts everyone by throwing a brick through a glass window, allowing Satya to escape with the money. However, the brothers catch up to them in an alley, and Mamlesh arrives and kills Satya. Over a flashback, Satya relates the story of Savitri, who tricked Yama, the god of death, into sparing her husband Satyavan, despite Satyavan being fated to die. The day then resets to Savi finding out she is pregnant, granting her a second chance at saving Satya.

As the second iteration begins, Savi takes Satya's call and asks him to stay put and not chase after the bus. As she tries to reach her father's gym, she gets into an altercation with a man, once again attracting the attention of David, who chases her into Jacob's cab and forces Jacob to drive at gunpoint, but they crash into the bus containing the cash. Savi, relatively unharmed, steals David's gun and holds Atul at gunpoint, but he does not have any money. As she leaves the gym, David chases her into Julia's wedding, and she hides in Julia's dressing room. There, Julia rants about the difficult situation she finds herself in, since she wants to marry Jacob. However, Savi advises her to leave Jacob and go through with the wedding, which Jacob overhears as he has climbed up the balcony. As Julia takes the advice and kisses her husband-to-be Robert, a shocked Jacob falls off the balcony and is severely injured. As Satya wanders near the jewelry store, he gets into an argument with the brothers and they take his gun. When Savi arrives, she tells Satya that they will rob the brothers after the brothers rob the shop. This plan works, but Jacob arrives and kills Satya as revenge for Savi ruining his life. The day resets again.

Once the third iteration starts, Savi decides to right her wrongs in order to save Satya. She apologizes to her father and the two reconcile, each agreeing to make an effort to get along with the other's boyfriend. She gets into Jacob's cab and convinces him that he must fight for Julia if he truly loves her. They drive to the wedding, where Savi helps Jacob and Julia elope. She steals a bag containing cash gifts for the wedding, then gambles that money and wins big, gaining enough cash to pay Victor back. Meanwhile, the brothers create a fake kidnapping situation so they can extract ransom money from their father. When Satya goes to rob the store, Mamlesh recognizes him as a former customer and hatches a plan with him to fake a robbery to collect insurance money. When the brothers arrive to act out the kidnapping, Mamlesh turns on Satya, only to realize that Satya had emptied his gun. As Satya leaves the store with the money, David and the police are responding to the hostage situation, but mistake him for a civilian and let him go. Satya meets with Savi and she reveals she is pregnant; they decide to get married. They deliver Victor's cash, and still have Savi's winnings left over. As the film ends, Satya notices the stranger on the bus who took his bag and begins chasing after him.

== Cast ==
- Taapsee Pannu as Savina Borkar aka Savi
- Tahir Raj Bhasin as Satyajeet aka Satya
- Dibyendu Bhattacharya as Victor
- Shreya Dhanwanthary as Julia
- Rajendra Chawla as Shree Mamlesh Charan Chaddha
- K. C. Shankar as Atul Borkar
- Manik Papneja as Appu
- Raghav Raj Kakker as Gappu
- Bhupesh Bandekar as Inspector David Colaco
- Sameer Kevin Roy as Jacob
- Alistar Bennis as Robert
- Varun Pande as Yash
- Sobita Kudtarkar as Bridesmaid

== Production ==
The principal photography of the film began in November 2020 and wrapped up in February 2021. Yash Khanna and Saumit Deshpande handled the cinematography for the entire shoot.

== Soundtrack ==
Looop Lapeta

Soundtrack album by Sidhant Mago, Mayank Mehra, Santanu Ghatak, Rahul Pais and Nariman Khambata
- Released: 18 January 2022
- Recorded: 2021
- Genre: Feature film soundtrack
- Length: 18:01
- Language: Hindi
- Label: Zee Music Company

Official audio
- Looop Lapeta - Full Album on YouTube

The soundtrack of the film has songs composed by Sidhant Mago, Mayank Mehra, Santanu Ghatak, Rahul Pais and Nariman Khambata, with lyrics written by Sidhant Mago, Santanu Ghatak and Siddhant Kaushal.

The background score has been composed by Rahul Pais and Nariman Khambata (The Jamroom).

Track listing
No.	Title	Lyrics	Music	Singer(s)	Length
1.	"Looop Lapeta"	Sidhant Mago	Sidhant Mago, Mayank Mehra	Jay Anand, Sidhant Mago	3:47
2.	"Beqaraar" (Duet)	Santanu Ghatak	Santanu Ghatak	Ronkini Gupta, Raghav Kaushik	3:55
3.	"Nirvana"	Sidhant Mago	Sidhant Mago, Mayank Mehra	Harshal Vyas	3:04
4.	"Tera Mera"	Siddhant Kaushal	Rahul Pais, Nariman Khambata	Sharvi Yadav	3:20
5.	"Beqaraar" (Female Version)	Santanu Ghatak	Santanu Ghatak	Ronkini Gupta	3:55
Total length:					18:01

== Reception ==
=== Critical response ===
On the review aggregator website Rotten Tomatoes, 78% of 18 critics' reviews are positive, with an average rating of 6.1/10.

Umesh Punwani of Koimoi rated the film 4 out of 5 stars and wrote, "Looop Lapeta not just touches a technical peak but is also backed by an extremely strong story & memorable performances. A visually appealing, soul-satisfying experience." Stutee Ghosh of The Quint rated the film 3.5 out of 5 stars and wrote, "It's this playfulness that ultimately works for Looop Lapeta though a tighter edit would have heightened its impact." Renuka Vyavahare of The Times Of India rated the film 3.5 out of 5 stars and wrote, "Looop Lapeta is a refreshing attempt to move beyond the mundane."

=== Accolades ===
Year	Award ceremony	Category	Nominee / work	Result	Ref.
2022	Filmfare OTT Awards	Best Web Original Film	Looop Lapeta	Nominated	
2022	Filmfare OTT Awards	Best Actress in a Web Original Film	Taapsee Pannu	Won	
2022	Filmfare OTT Awards	Best Supporting Actress in a Web Original Film	Shreya Dhanwanthary	Nominated	

== See also ==
- List of films featuring time loops
