= Alawalpur, Palwal =

Coordinates: 28°17′N 77°37′E

Alawalpur is a village in the Palwal district, in Haryana State in northern India. It is administered by a sarpanch.

The village has a post office and a branch of the Punjab National Bank.
