= Shabaash Mithu =

2022 Indian sports biographical film

- Theatrical release poster
- Directed by: Srijit Mukherji
- Written by: Priya Aven; Vijay Maurya (dialogues)
- Based on: Mithali Raj
- Produced by: Ajit Andhare
- Starring: Taapsee Pannu; Mumtaz Sorcar; Vijay Raaz; Sameer Dharmadhikari; Devadarshini
- Cinematography: Sirsha Ray
- Edited by: A. Sreekar Prasad
- Music by: Amit Trivedi; Salvage Audio Collective; Charan
- Production companies: Viacom18 Studios; Colosceum Media
- Distributed by: Viacom18 Studios
- Release date: 15 July 2022
- Running time: 156 minutes
- Country: India
- Language: Hindi
- Budget: ₹48 crore
- Box office: est. ₹2.89 crore

Shabaash Mithu is a 2022 Indian Hindi-language biographical sports drama film directed by Srijit Mukherji and produced by Viacom18 Studios. It chronicles the ups and downs and moments of glory in the life of former Test and ODI captain of the India women's national cricket team, Mithali Raj and stars Taapsee Pannu in the titular role. It released on 15 July 2022.

The received mixed to positive reviews from critics but was a major box-office disaster, grossing just under a tenth of its budget at the box office.

== Plot ==
Mithali Raj is the former Test and ODI captain of the women's national cricket team. She led India to the finals of the 2017 Women's Cricket World Cup.

The film, based on her life, chronicles the events of her life's journey in the world of women's cricket. It presents her struggles and euphoric rise in women's cricket.

== Cast ==
- Taapsee Pannu as Mithali "Mithu" Raj
  - Inayat Verma as Young Mithali Raj
- Mumtaz Sorcar as Jhorna Ghosh, character based on Jhulan Goswami
- Vijay Raaz as Sampath, Mithali's coach
- Brijendra Kala as BCCI Main Person
- Sameer Dharmadhikari as Dorai Raj, Mithali's father
- Devadarshini as Leela Raj, Mithali's mother
- Swayam Joshi as an unnamed young boy
- Aditi Aryan as Sresha Badyal
- Nirali Oza as Preeti Valhar
- Priya Kumari as Roma Kwatra
- Ramya Suresh as Himakshi Ganeshan
- Titeeksha Tawde as Khushi Anvekar
- Kajal Shishodia as Kajal Sutar
- Manashree Gavande as Manashree Gavande
- Vaishnavi Desai as Vaishnavi Madiga
- Ramsingh Falkoti as Peon Bala
- Shilpi Marwaha as Sukumari Marwaha
- Anushree Kushwaha as Noorie
  - Kasturi Jagnam as Young Noorie
- Nishant Pradhan as Mithun Raj, Mithali's brother
- Kalyani Jha as Perizad
- Sampa Mandal as Nilu Paswan
- Vishak Nair as Chandan ji, Nilu's fiancé
- Geeta Agarwal Sharma as Women's Cricket Board (WCB) Chief Shanta

== Production ==
=== Development ===
After the 2017 Women's Cricket World Cup, Viacom 18 Motion Pictures acquired the rights to make a feature film on Raj's life. She said, "Hoping that this movie inspires more people, especially young girls to take up sports as a career."

The biopic was planned to shoot in 2019. Raj said, "I think Priyanka Chopra will be a great choice (to play me in the biopic). Our personalities match a lot. I am not a movie buff, so I'd love the experts to do their job." Finally it was Taapsee Pannu who was chosen to play the role of Mithali Raj in the biopic named as Shabaash Mithu, to be directed by Rahul Dholakia in 2020.

=== Preparation and training ===
On 3 December 2019, coinciding with the birthday of Mithali Raj, the film was finalized with Taapsee Pannu in the title role and Rahul Dholakia as director. In January 2021 Pannu posted her training photos from 3 December 2019, 29 January 2020 and 27 January 2021. In March 2021, Taapsee Pannu again posted photos of her preparation and training for the film. She trained under Nooshin Al Khadeer, a former cricket player and Mithali Raj's friend. The film earlier was anticipated to be released on 5 February 2021 under direction of Rahul Dholakia, but filming was delayed due to COVID-19.

In June Srijit Mukherji replaced Rahul Dholakia as director of the film due to change of schedule.

=== Filming ===
Principal photography began on 5 April 2021 after being delayed due to COVID-19. Filming was finally wrapped up on 9 November. The film was shot on Lord's Cricket Ground in London, and across domestic and international locations to bring real feel of actual events that happened in Mithali's life.

== Soundtrack ==
Shabaash Mithu

Soundtrack album by Amit Trivedi, Salvage Audio Collective and Charan
- Released: 20 June 2022
- Genre: Feature film soundtrack
- Length: 36:31
- Language: Hindi
- Label: T-Series
- Producer: Bhushan Kumar

Official audio
- Shabaash Mithu - Full Album on YouTube

The music of the film is composed by Amit Trivedi, Salvage Audio Collective and Charan. Lyrics are written by Swanand Kirkire, Kausar Munir and Charan. The background score is composed by Salvage Audio Collective.

Tracklist
No.	Title	Lyrics	Singer(s)	Length
1.	"Fateh" (Music by Salvage Audio Collective, Charan)	Charan	Romy, Charan	2:28
2.	"Hindustan Meri Jaan"	Swanand Kirkire	Kailash Kher, Ruchika	4:02
3.	"Agaaz Hai Tu"	Swanand Kirkire	Neha Kakkar	4:12
4.	"Udd Gayi Re Muniya"	Swanand Kirkire	Neeraj Arya	3:57
5.	"Masti Takita Dhum"	Swanand Kirkire	Lagnajita, Anusha Mani	3:14
6.	"Woh Galiyaan"	Kausar Munir	Monali Thakur, Shashwat Singh	4:00
7.	"Agaaz Hai Tu"	Swanand Kirkire	Yashita Sharma	1:27
8.	"Hindustan Meri Jaan"	Swanand Kirkire	Amit Trivedi, Kailash Kher	3:47
9.	"Hindustan Meri Jaan"	Swanand Kirkire	Amit Trivedi, Ruchika	5:24
10.	"Woh Galiyaan"	Kausar Munir	Deepali Sathe, Shashwat Sing	4:00
Total length:				36:31

== Release ==
=== Theatrical ===
On 3 December coinciding with birthday of Mithali Raj releasing a teaser poster the producer announced the release date of the film as 4 February 2022. The date clashed with Rajkummar Rao's comedy film Badhaai Do, which was postponed to 11 February. Subsequently, the film was not released and finally it was released on 15 July 2022.

=== Festival ===
In 2023, the film was selected for the 'Game On' section at the 29th Kolkata International Film Festival.

=== Home media ===
The film digitally streamed on both Voot and Netflix in Hindi and dubbed versions in Tamil and Telugu languages from 12 August 2022.

== Reception ==
=== Box office ===
Shabaash Mithu earned ₹40 lakhs at the domestic box office on its opening day, ₹55 lakhs on the second day and ₹70 lakhs on third day.

As of 23 July 2022, the film grossed ₹2.52 crore (US$260,000) in India and ₹24 lakh (US$25,000) overseas, for a worldwide gross collection of ₹2.76 crore (US$290,000). Film was declared disaster at box office after end of its theatrical run.

=== Critical response ===
Anindita Mukherjee of India Today rated the film 3.5 out of 5 stars and wrote, "Shabaash Mithu is a film that will definitely not turn around Bollywood's fate in the era of South domination, but it surely moves you." Saibal Chatterjee of NDTV rated the film 3 out of 5 stars and wrote, "As a fond tribute to a cricketer who transformed the fortunes of women in India's most popular sport, it puts just enough on the scoreboard not be dismissed as an innings without substance." Sonil Dedhia of News 18 rated the film 3 out of 5 stars and wrote, "The film has sincerity and has been crafted with care." Rachana Dubey of The Times of India rated the film 3 out of 5 stars and wrote, " The movie doesn't amply showcase those edge-of-the-seat, nail-biting moments that would have unfolded in her life, especially during the 2017 world cup." Himesh Mankad of Pinkvilla rated the film 3 out of 5 stars. Shubhra Gupta of The Indian Express rated the film 2.5 out of 5 stars and wrote, "Taapsee Pannu shines in a film that has no space for nuance. Director Srijit Mukerji ensures everything is underlined in this sports drama." Bollywood Hungama rated the film with 3 stars out of 5 and wrote, "On the whole, Shabaash Mithu tells an inspiring tale of one of the greatest cricket legends in the world. At the box office, it has the potential to draw in audiences, especially in urban centres. It also deserves tax-free status."
