= Alawalpur, Bagpat =

Village in Uttar Pradesh, India

Alawalpur
- Interactive map of Alawalpur
- Coordinates: 31°26′6″N 75°38′54″E
- Country: India
- State: Uttar Pradesh
- District: Bagpat
- Elevation: 233 m (764 ft)
- Time zone: Indian Standard Time

Alawalpur is a small village situated in Bagpat district of Uttar Pradesh, India. It is about 60 kilometres (37 mi) away from the Indian Capital New Delhi. It is known for its constituency Bagpat, which is the main working area of Rashtriya Lok Dal.

== Administration ==
Alawalpur is part of the tehsil of Baraut. The telephone code is 01234, and the pin code is 250611.

Alternate village name: Allawalpur

== Population ==
Most people in the village speak Hindi.

== Geography ==
The village is in the Indian Standard Time zone (UTC+5:30). Its elevation is 233 meters above sea level.
