= Mogudu (film) =

- Movie Poster
- Directed by: Krishna Vamsi
- Screenplay by: Krishna Vamsi
- Story by: Krishna Vamsi; Sheik Dawood G.
- Produced by: Nallamalupu Srinivas (Bujji)
- Starring: Gopichand; Taapsee
- Cinematography: Srikanth Naroj
- Edited by: Gautham Raju
- Music by: Babu Shankar
- Production company: Sri Lakshmi Narasimha Productions
- Release date: 4 November 2011
- Running time: 159 minutes
- Country: India
- Language: Telugu

Mogudu (transl. Husband) is a 2011 Indian Telugu-language drama film produced by Nallamalupu Srinivas (Bujji), under Sri Lakshmi Narasimha Productions, and directed by Krishna Vamsi. It stars Gopichand and Taapsee Pannu with Rajendra Prasad and Roja in supporting roles with music composed by Babu Shankar as his debut. The film recorded as utter flop at box office. The film is all about how a man truly becomes husband when he understands his wife and wins her love. The film released on 4 November 2011.

== Plot ==
Bujji (Gopichand) is the only son of wealthy and influential farmer Anjaneya Prasad (Rajendra Prasad). The family is well knit together and has strong values and attachments. Bujji comes across Raja Rajeshwari (Taapsee) in unexpected circumstances and falls in love with her. Raja is the daughter of a powerful politician Chamundeshwari (Roja) and Shankar Rao (Naresh). The families agree to the marriage and everything seems to go smoothly.

After the marriage, Prasad asks Raja to grab the gowri devi idol and get in to the car which Raja's maternal grandmother refused to due to some bad omens may happen. But Chamundeshwari's assumption of Bujji might break it off with Raja creates a fight between the families. Prasad's second son-in-law grabs the idol. Seeing this, Chamundeshwari slaps him. In shock, Prasad slaps Chamundeshwari. In return, Chamundeshwari Slaps him with her slipper leaving everyone in shock. But Bujji enters the scenario and slaps Chamundeshwari where Raja slaps him for beating her mother. Raja, starts to cry and throws her Mangala sutra on Bujji's face leaving everyone astonished.

The next day, Raja's Maternal Uncle (Ahuti Prasad ) visits their house and gets to know what happened. He goes to Bujji's house and forces him to sign for the divorce. though Bujji refuses, he was forced to sign. Raja after seeing the divorce papers in police station leaves her heartbroken and she signs and leaves the place.

To heal from the trauma, they both go to Mauritius as they booked their honeymoon tickets in advance before their wedding, but they bump into each other .Into this scenario comes Jo (Shraddha Das), who is madly in love with Bujji. But Raja starts to be jealous. Thinking they might hook up, Raja spoils every date of them. One day while Jo was trying to seduce him, Raja was eavesdropping, but she fails to hear their conversation as Bujji can see her hiding near the bushes and runs away thinking that Bujji will chase her. Which leads to Jo proposing to him, but he denies and says that he still loves her.

The next day, Raja enters Bujji's hotel room and they argue about what happened during their wedding. Raja says that she was in a state of shock which was a reason to snap her wedding chain, But Bujji observes blood in Raja's mouth and she says that she drank a poison that is used to kill sharks, leading her to faint. But she survives. Jo, gets happy after seeing them reunite but she cries because she couldn't get reciprocation from Bujji. Bujji consoles her by saying that she will find a better guy and they leave to India. Before Bujji arrives, Chamundeshwari creates a fuss at Bujji's house and says that Raja went missing and she thinks that Bujji might elope with her. But after checking his house, she understands and leaves.

Few minutes later, Bujji and Raja arrive but the family denies her and forces Bujji to kick her out of the house. Bujji feeling bad drops her at her home and gets the audacity to beat their henchmen .After reaching home, Bujji convinces the family and they move on. Chamundeshwari arranges second marriage for Raja because she gets to know about their reuniting in Mauritius. But Bujji arrives and tells the groom and his family to get out, leading Chamundeshwari's henchmen to attack on him. Raja tries to stop but her brother slaps her leading her to fall down. Bujji after seeing his wife being abused, fights back.

Chamundeshwari sees Raja's Mangala sutra on her neck and she forces Raja to remove the chain but Raja slaps her mother and denies to remove it. At the same time, Bujji's family arrive at the scene and the latter and his family Apologies to Raja's family, and they apologies back too.

The movie ends with Raja and Bujji reconcile.

== Cast ==
- Gopichand as Ramprasad "Bujji"
- Taapsee as Raja Rajeshwari "Raji"
- Shraddha Das as Jo "Joshna"
- Rajendra Prasad as Anjaneya Prasad
- Roja as Chamundeshwari
- Naresh as Shankar Rao
- Ahuti Prasad
- Venu Madhav as Venu Babu
- Krishnudu
- Praveen
- Narsing Yadav
- Maharshi Raghava as Lawyer Sridhar
- Harsha Vardhan as Dr. Sagar
- Geethanjali
- Lakshmi Bhargavi as Sarada
- Jaya Lakshmi as Dr. Gauthami
- Ramya Nittala as Bhagamati
- Sarayu
- Mast Ali

== Soundtrack ==
Mogudu

Film score by Babu Shankar
- Released: 12 October 2011
- Recorded: 2011
- Genre: Soundtrack
- Length: 37:14
- Label: Aditya Music
- Producer: Babu Shankar

Music was composed by Babu Shankar. Music was released on Aditya Music. The audio was launched at Rock Heights, Hyderabad, for which several film stars attended. D. Suresh Babu unveiled the logo of the film. Rajendra Prasad released the first look trailer of the flick. NTR unveiled the audio CD and presented the first album to V. V. Vinayak.

No.	Title	Lyrics	Singer(s)	Length
1.	"Kavali Kavali"	Sirivennela Sitarama Sastry	Madhumitha, Babu Shankar	5:31
2.	"Bachelor Boys"	Sirivennela Sitarama Sastry	Benny Dayal, Babu Shankar	3:58
3.	"Choosthunna"	Sirivennela Sitarama Sastry	Karthik	4:29
4.	"Aakalakalala"	Sirivennela Sitarama Sastry	Hemachandra, Chinmayi	4:21
5.	"Eppudu Nee Roopamlo"	Sirivennela Sitarama Sastry	Karthik	4:40
6.	"Nuvvante Naku"	Ramajogayya Sastry	Sunitha Sarathy	4:34
7.	"Ettantee Mogudu"	Suddala Ashok Teja	Geetha Madhuri	4:56
8.	"Choosthunna" (Fusion Mix)	Sirivennela Sitarama Sastry	Karthik	4:29
Total length:				37:14

== Critical reception ==
Oneindia.in stated "Mogudu is a film that shows the values of a joint family, friendship, responsibility, love, and affection etc. Krishna Vamsi succeeds partly in his mission. The trademark Krishna Vamsi style and magic is missing in the film. The movie may appeal family audience. Mogudu is a mixed bag and the fans of Krishna Vamsi will not be fully satisfied with it". Rediff which gave a two stars said "Krishnavamsi's fascination for the family and for tradition is given full play in the film. The decibel levels are high: everyone is either shouting, screaming or hitting everyone else. Dialogues are tacky and it's all just one big high-voltage melodrama. On the whole, a disappointing film. NDTV said "The film is just an above average fare. It is a disappointment for the director's ardent fans who expect much from his films. However praised the lead performances, saying "Gopi Chand looks stylish in his designer wear. He is good in action sequences and shows his talent as a performer. But, it is Rajendra Prasad who steals the show with his stellar performance".

Deepa Garimella of fullhyd.com praised the film's screenplay and the casting but said that the movie is a "disappointing, unfulfilling anecdote of a newly-wed husband and a wife dealing with an unpleasant family fracas", rating it 5 out of 10.
