= Taapsee Pannu =

Indian actress (born 1987)

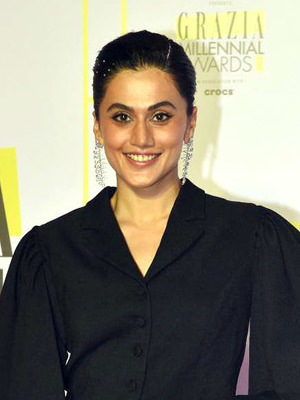
- Pannu in 2022
- Born: Tapasee Pannu; 1 August 1987 (age 39); New Delhi, India
- Other name: Taapsee
- Education: Guru Gobind Singh Indraprastha University
- Occupation: Actress
- Years active: 2010–present
- Works: Full list
- Spouse: Mathias Boe (m. 2023)

Tapasee Pannu (born 1 August 1987), professionally known as Taapsee Pannu, is an Indian actress who primarily works in Hindi, Telugu and Tamil films. She has received two Filmfare Awards and a Filmfare OTT Award.

After a brief career in modelling, Pannu made her acting debut with the 2010 Telugu film Jhummandi Naadam and appeared in the 2011 Tamil film Aadukalam. She entered Hindi cinema with David Dhawan's comedy Chashme Baddoor (2013). Following several leading roles in Telugu and Tamil films, Pannu gained wider recognition in Hindi cinema with her performances in the spy thriller Baby (2015) and the courtroom drama Pink (2016), both of which were critically and commercially successful.

She subsequently established herself with roles in the war drama The Ghazi Attack (2017), the social drama Mulk (2018), the romantic drama Manmarziyaan (2018), the psychological thriller Badla (2019), and the space drama Mission Mangal (2019). Her portrayal of septuagenarian sharpshooter Prakashi Tomar in the biopic Saand Ki Aankh (2019) won her the Filmfare Critics Award for Best Actress, while her performance as a homemaker navigating divorce in Thappad (2020) earned her the Filmfare Award for Best Actress. She later starred in streaming releases including Haseen Dillruba (2021) and its sequel Phir Aayi Hasseen Dillruba (2024), Rashmi Rocket (2021), and Looop Lapeta (2022). After a series of underperforming films, she achieved her highest-grossing release with the comedy-drama Dunki (2023).

In addition to acting, Pannu co-owns the event management company The Wedding Factory and the badminton franchise Pune 7 Aces, which competes in the Premier Badminton League. She is married to former badminton player Mathias Boe.

== Early life and work ==
Taapsee Pannu was born on 1 August 1987 in New Delhi to a Jat Sikh family. Her father, Dilmohan Singh Pannu, is a retired real estate agent while her mother, Nirmaljeet Kaur Pannu, is a homemaker. Dilmohan's family, who lived in Shakti Nagar, Delhi, were targeted during the 1984 anti-Sikh riots but survived after finding refuge in their Hindu neighbours' homes. She also has a younger sister, Shagun. She did her schooling at the Mata Jai Kaur Public School in Ashok Vihar and studied Computer Science and Engineering at the Guru Gobind Singh Indraprastha University, Hari Nagar.

After graduating, Pannu worked as a software engineer. She became a full-time model after she auditioned and was selected for Channel V's 2008 talent show Get Gorgeous, which eventually led her to acting. Pannu has been appearing in numerous print and television commercials and won several titles during her modelling days, including "Pantaloons Femina Miss Fresh Face" and "Safi Femina Miss Beautiful Skin" at the 2008 Femina Miss India contest.

As a model, she endorsed brands such as Reliance Trends, Red FM 93.5, UniStyle Image, Coca-Cola, Motorola, Pantaloon, PVR Cinemas, Standard Chartered Bank, Dabur, Airtel, Tata Docomo, World Gold Council, Havells and Vardhman. After a few years, she lost interest in modelling as she thought that she could never gain proper recognition through modelling, but only through films, and finally decided to act.

== Career ==
=== Early work and recognition (2010–2015) ===
Pannu made her cinematic debut in 2010 with K. Raghavendra Rao's Telugu romantic musical Jhummandi Naadam. She played the role of the daughter of a USA–based millionaire who comes to India to research traditional Telugu music. Pannu received three more offers in Telugu prior to the film's release. Her next film Aadukalam (2011), marked her debut in Tamil cinema. She played the role of an Anglo-Indian girl falling in love with a rural man played by Dhanush. The film, set in the backdrop of Madurai, revolves around cockfights. It was critically acclaimed and proceeded to win six National Film Awards at the 58th National Film Awards. Speaking about her role, a reviewer from Sify said: "Debutant Taapsee is a promising find and she suits the character of an Anglo-Indian girl to the T". She returned to the Telugu film industry with Vastadu Naa Raju (2011), opposite Vishnu Manchu. She made a foray into Malayalam cinema later that year, with Doubles (2011), opposite Mammootty and Nadiya Moidu. Paresh C Palicha of Rediff commented: "Taapsee Pannu as Saira Banu, whose entry into the scene becomes the bone of contention between the siblings, has nothing noteworthy to do".

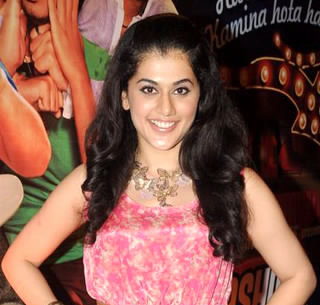
Pannu at the audio launch of Chashme Baddoor, 2013.

Pannu played a short role in her next release Mr. Perfect (2011) alongside Prabhas and Kajal Aggarwal. She starred in a high-budget film titled Veera (2011), opposite Ravi Teja and Kajal Aggarwal, which received mixed reviews. She was next seen in her second Tamil film Vandhaan Vendraan, that also received mixed reviews from critics and did not fare well commercially. Her next film was Krishna Vamsi's Mogudu opposite Gopichand. She garnered critical acclaim for her performance. She worked on several Telugu films at this time including Gundello Godari, Daruvu, and Shadow. In subsequent years, Pannu discussed being labelled an "unlucky charm" due to all of her films failing commercially.

In 2013, Pannu made her Hindi film debut with David Dhawan's comedy Chashme Baddoor, co-starring Siddharth, Rishi Kapoor, Divyendu Sharma and Ali Zafar. A remake of the eponymous 1981 film, it met with unanimous negative reviews but remerged as a box-office success. Later, she was seen in the big-budget action thriller Arrambam co-starring Ajith Kumar, Nayanthara and Arya. She was awarded the Most Enthusiastic Performer – Female award at the 2014 Edison Awards, in addition to receiving a nomination for the Filmfare Award for Best Supporting Actress – Tamil.

Following an absence from films for a year, she made a significant advancement in her career due to her supporting role in Neeraj Pandey's spy thriller Baby (2015), as undercover agent Shabana Khan. Later, she had two Tamil releases, the horror comedy Muni 3, opposite Raghava Lawrence and Aishwarya R. Dhanush's Vai Raja Vai, which featured her in a special appearance.

=== Success in Hindi films (2016–2020) ===
While filming for Running Shaadi, Pannu was approached by Shoojit Sircar for the courtroom drama Pink. She was "curious and excited" about the subject as it had not "been dealt with head-on yet in mainstream cinema". The film, which also starred Amitabh Bachchan, Kirti Kulhari and Andrea Tariang, followed three girls who fight a case against a politician's nephew for molestation. The film and Pannu's performance received positive reviews. Rajeev Masand noted that Pannu, along with other two ladies, "deliver natural performances as strong but emotionally vulnerable women, without a hint of affectation". With worldwide revenue of ₹1.08 billion (US$11 million), Pink emerged as a major commercial success. Pannu later said that the film proved to be a turning point in her career, and earned her the IIFA Woman of the Year award, in addition to her first nomination for the IIFA Award for Best Actress.

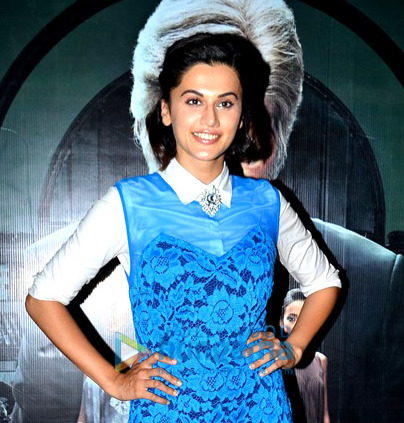
Pannu at the premiere of Pink 2016.

Pannu's first release of 2017 was the romantic comedy Running Shaadi opposite Amit Sadh, where she played a Punjabi girl who helps couples in eloping to get married. The film received mixed critical reception but Pannu received unanimous praise for her performance. Following this, she starred in the naval war drama, The Ghazi Attack based on the mysterious sinking of PNS Ghazi during the Indo-Pakistani War of 1971. The film was shot simultaneously in Telugu and Hindi and performed modestly at the box-office. Pannu reprised her role in a spin-off to her film Baby, titled Naam Shabana. Pandey noticed that Pannu's seven-eight minute sequence in the role of special agent Shabana Khan in Baby was well received after which he "decided to give the story an arc". For the role, she trained in different forms of mixed martial arts like Kūdō and Krav Maga. Both the film and Pannu's performance met with mixed response with Sarita A. Tanwar of Daily News and Analysis noting that she is "fantastic in every scene" while Udita Jhunjhunwala of Mint felt that she is "hardly likable" in the film. Pannu's subsequent roles were of a ghost in the Telugu horror comedy film Anando Brahma and the protagonist's girlfriend in the action-comedy Judwaa 2. The latter, which was a reboot of the 1997 namesake film, proved to be commercial success, earning over ₹2 billion (US$21 million). Despite disliking the film, Shubhra Gupta of The Indian Express found Pannu to be the "real surprise" among the ensemble adding that she "makes the most" of an otherwise thinly written part.

Dil Juunglee (2018), co-starring Saqib Saleem, was Pannu's first release of the year. It failed to create an impact among the critics and the audience. Her followup was Shaad Ali's sports drama Soorma which was based on the life of field hockey player Sandeep Singh (played by Diljit Dosanjh). Despite mixed reviews, Soorma became a financial success. Pannu then depicted a lawyer in Anubhav Sinha's legal drama Mulk. Pannu said that the film presents true patriotism and nationalism without taking sides. Pannu's performance was praised with Nandini Ramnath of Scroll.in calling her one of the "strong turns" of the film; the film earned her a first nomination for the Filmfare Award for Best Actress (Critics).

After playing the role of an antagonist in the Telugu action thriller Neevevaro, Pannu played the central role of Rumi Bagga, a free-spirited girl caught in a love triangle, in Anurag Kashyap's romantic drama Manmarziyaan alongside Abhishek Bachchan and Vicky Kaushal. The film premiered at 2018 Toronto International Film Festival to positive critical reviews, with widespread critical acclaim for Pannu's performance. Anupama Chopra called her performance "mercurial, mysterious and maddening": "With her cloud of red hair enveloping her, Rumi seems, continually to be a woman on a warpath". The same year, she also acted in two short films: Baarish aur Chowmein and Nitishastra.

Pannu had a string of releases in 2019, with the first being Sujoy Ghosh's psychological thriller, Badla, an official remake of the 2016 Spanish film The Invisible Guest. It also marked her second collaboration with Amitabh Bachchan. She was initially offered a supporting role and the film had a male lead, however, Pannu convinced the producer to have the lead role played by a female which he agreed to and offered her the role. Badla met with highly positive reviews, as did Pannu's performance as Naina Sethi, a shrewd businesswoman. In her review of the film, film critic Namrata Joshi of The Hindu appreciated Pannu for being "in fine form"; the film met with strong box-office results. Pannu's performance in the film earned the Zee Cine Award for Best Actress (Critics), in addition to her second Best Actress nominations at the annual IIFA and Screen award ceremonies. Pannu then essayed the role of a game designer who uses a wheelchair and battles a home invasion in the psychological thriller Game Over, directed by Ashwin Saravanan. The film was shot simultaneously in Tamil and Telugu language. During the duration of the filming, Pannu had to be in a wheelchair for 12 hours for 25 days. The film and her performance were praised; Saibal Chatterjee said that Pannu "is never less than convincing" and "may be the primary reason why you must go out a watch this film".

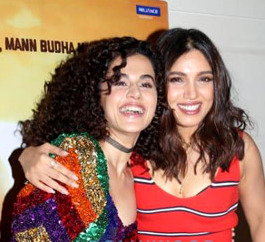
Pannu attending an event for Saand Ki Aankh in 2019 with co-star Bhumi Pednekar.

She next played an ISRO scientist in the space drama Mission Mangal which was about India's first interplanetary expedition, Mars Orbiter Mission. Pannu accepted a role in the film due to her appreciation of the idea of a space film with, "several leading ladies in it". With a global collection of over ₹2.9 billion (US$30 million), Mission Mangal proved to be one of Pannu's biggest financial successes. Her final film of the year was Tushar Hiranandani's biographical film Saand Ki Aankh, co-starring Bhumi Pednekar. Pannu portrayed the role of Prakashi Tomar, one of the world's oldest sharpshooters for which she underwent three months of training in pistol shooting. Her role was well-received with Anna M. M. Vetticad writing that both Pannu and Pednekar succeed in "delivering equally finely tuned, sensitive performances". Pannu and Pednekar jointly received the Filmfare Award for Best Actress (Critics).

Pannu's sole release of 2020 was Anubhav Sinha's social drama Thappad, where she played the role of Amrita, a home-maker who files for divorce after her husband slaps her. She said that the character's "righteousness, her maturity to handle every situation" made her suffocate. The film and Pannu's performance met with widespread critical acclaim. Shubhra Gupta of The Indian Express noted that she "drives the film" but added that "the effort she puts into her performance shows". Pannu was awarded with the Filmfare Award for Best Actress and received her third nomination for the Filmfare Award for Best Actress (Critics). The film emerged as a moderate commercial success.

=== Streaming projects and Dunki (2021–present) ===
Pannu's first release of 2021 was the romantic thriller Haseen Dillruba opposite Vikrant Massey. The film premiered on the streaming platform, Netflix and was Pannu's first of several streaming releases. It emerged as the most-watched Hindi film on the platform that year. Both the film and Pannu's performance were, however, poorly received by critics, with Rohan Naahar from Hindustan Times calling it a "hot mess" along with describing it as "illogical" and "ill-conceived" and added that "Pannu's performance as a bored housewife named Rani is all over the place". Shubhra Gupta from The Indian Express also criticised her role in the film stating, "Pannu's delivery is exactly the same in her films: only the costumes change". Despite this, her performance in the film earned her a fourth nomination for the Filmfare Award for Best Actress (Critics). Pannu's role in the Tamil-language comedy horror Annabelle Sethupathi opposite Vijay Sethupathi generally went unnoticed.

Her final film of the year was Rashmi Rocket, a sports drama that tells a story of an Indian track and field athlete who was subject to gender testing due to being diagnosed with hyperandrogenism. Ronak Kotecha of The Times of India commented, "Pannu once again proves her mettle. Her effort to celebrate Rashmi's victory and endure her pain, is as real as it gets and the actress doesn't miss the beat when it comes to making us root for her character". She received her second nomination for the Filmfare Award for Best Actress for her performance in the film. Pannu's third and final release of 2021 was the Telugu film Mishan Impossible directed by Swaroop RSJ. The film marked her comeback in Telugu films after Anando Brahma in 2017.

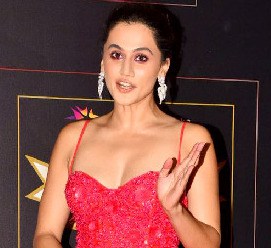
Pannu in 2022

In 2022, Pannu starred in the comedy thriller Looop Lapeta, an official remake of the 1998 German film Run Lola Run. It released on Netflix. The film, and Pannu's performance, received critical acclaim, earning her the Filmfare OTT Award for Best Actress in a Web Original Film. She next starred in the film directed by Srijit Mukherji, based on the life of former Test and ODI captain of the India women's national cricket team, Mithali Raj, titled Shabaash Mithu. Upon release, the film was panned by critics and audiences, and emerged as a commercial failure at the box-office; however Pannu's performance received praise, earning her a fifth nomination for the Filmfare Award for Best Actress (Critics).

She then starred in the sci-fi mystery film Dobaaraa, which was a remake of 2018 Spanish thriller Mirage (2018), her second collaboration with director Anurag Kashyap. The film and Pannu's performance received positive reviews; however, it emerged as a commercial failure at the box-office. In December, her first production venture Blurr was released online on Zee5. A remake of the Spanish thriller film Julia's Eyes (2010), opposite Gulshan Devaiah. the film marked Pannu's third film to be remade from a Spanish original, after Badla (2019) and Dobaara (2022). She then starred in the romantic comedy Tadka alongside Nana Patekar, Shriya Saran and Ali Fazal. Due to unresolved financial issues with the producers, Pannu and Fazal chose not to participate in the film's promotions as they had not been paid. Despite disliking the film, Archika Khurana of The Times of India thought Pannu provided "solid support", but found both her and Fazal to be wasted in their roles. In 2023, Pannu appeared in Rajkumar Hirani’s comedy-drama Dunki opposite Shah Rukh Khan as Manu, a Punjabi woman with aspirations of travelling to England. Upon being signed for the film, she expressed her admiration for Khan and mentioned that it had been a "dream" to work with him. Monika Rawal Kukreja of Hindustan Times described Pannu's performance as "natural" and added that "in the emotionally charged scenes, Pannu showcases a strong grip on her character, and in the funny ones, too, she holds her ground," but disliked her chemistry with Khan. The film emerged as a commercial success at the box-office, grossing over ₹450 crore (equivalent to ₹491 crore or US$51 million in 2026) to become Pannu's highest-grosser. Dunki earned her a third nomination for the Filmfare Award for Best Actress.

In August 2024, Pannu reprised her role in the romantic thriller sequel Phir Aayi Hasseen Dillruba. She expressed feeling a sense of ease in knowing that the character had already been well received by audiences. In a mixed review for Mint, Uday Bhatia noted that Pannu's performance elevated the script of an otherwise "flailing" film. In the same month, she starred among an ensemble in the comedy Khel Khel Mein, about a group of married friends who partake in a game that reveals their secrets. Based on the Italian film Perfect Strangers, Pannu portrayed a social media influencer who learns of her husband's (played by Ammy Virk) infidelity. Devesh Sharma of Filmfare commended her "standout performance" that broke away from her established persona as a "serious actress". The film failed at the box-office, which The Times of India attributed to its release alongside Stree 2. Pannu will next portray the role of a police officer in Woh Ladki Hai Kahaan and appear in Barath Neelakantan's sci-fi project titled Alien. In 2026, Pannu starred in Anubhav Sinha’s courtroom drama Assi, in which she portrayed a lawyer named Raavi fighting a high-profile sexual assault case. The film marked her third collaboration with Sinha after Mulk and Thappad. In September, her action-thriller film Gandhari is set to release on Netflix.

== Other work and media image ==
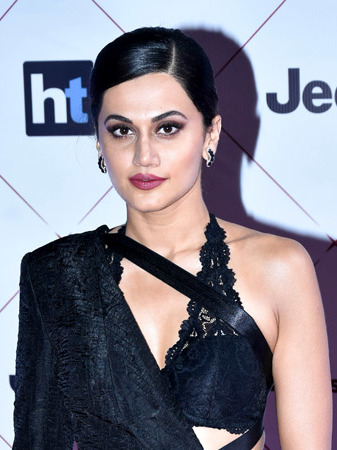
Pannu at the 2018 HT Style Awards

Raghuvendra Singh of Filmfare says Pannu is "one of the most versatile actresses in the industry". Verve's Zaral Shah finds her to be "frank and forthright". Aditi Bhimjyani of Vogue noted, "Pannu has been busy making her unforgettable mark via her filmography of strong leading roles". Femina's Shraddha Kamdar calls her a "self-made artiste" who is "unafraid of challenges". Sukanya Verma featured her in Rediff's list of "Best Bollywood Actresses" in 2018, 2019, and 2021.

In 2017, Pannu featured in Forbes India's 30 Under 30 list. In 2018, she featured in Forbes India's list of Celebrity 100 at 67th position with an estimate income of ₹15.48 crore (US$1.6 million). She was featured for a second time in 2019, ranking 68th. Pannu has frequently featured in Times' 50 Most Desirable Women list, she ranked 36th in 2019, and 23rd in 2020. Pannu is an active celebrity endorser for Uber, Garnier, Nivea, Kurkure, and Women's Horlicks.

Pannu runs an event management company called "The Wedding Factory" which she manages along with her sister Shagun and friend Farah Parvaresh. In 2018, she bought the badminton franchise Pune 7 Aces which plays in the Premier Badminton League. In 2019, Pannu raised awareness about children's health, and gender parity on Twitter with hashtag #WhyTheGap. In December 2022, she attended NDTV's show Jai Jawan and tested her mettle.

== Personal life ==
Pannu was in an eleven year relationship with Danish badminton player Mathias Boe and was engaged to him for nine years before getting married. Following a court marriage in December 2023, Pannu married Boe on 23 March 2024 in a traditional wedding ceremony in Udaipur. They live in Odense, Denmark.

== Accolades ==
Year	Award	Category	Film	Result	Ref.
2013	Santosham Film Awards	Special award(Jury)	Gundello Godari	Won	
2013	TSR – TV9 National Film Awards	Best Actress	Mogudu	Won	
2014	Edison Awards	Most Enthusiastic Performer – Female Award	Arrambam	Won	
2014	61st Filmfare Awards South	Best Supporting Actress – Tamil	Arrambam	Nominated	
2014	3rd South Indian International Movie Awards	Best Actress in a Supporting Role – Tamil	Arrambam	Nominated	
2017	Stardust Awards	Best Actor (Female)	Pink	Nominated	
2017	BIG Zee Entertainment Awards	Most Entertaining Actor in a Social Film – Female	Pink	Nominated	
2017	Jagran Film Festival	Best Actor (Female) – Jury Special Award	Pink	Won	
2017	Zee Cine Awards	Best Actress	Pink	Nominated	
2017	18th IIFA Awards	Best Actress	Pink	Nominated	
2017	18th IIFA Awards	Woman Of The Year	Pink	Won	
2018	Zee Cine Awards	Best Actress (Jury Choice)	Naam Shabana	Nominated	
2018	Zee Cine Awards	Extraordinary Impact Award – Female	Naam Shabana	Won	
2019	GQ Style & Culture Awards 2019	Excellence in Acting	Manmarziyaan	Won	
2019	Screen Awards	Best Actress	Manmarziyaan	Nominated	
2019	Screen Awards	Best Actress (Critics)	Mulk	Nominated	
2019	Zee Cine Awards	Best Actor – Female (Viewers' Choice)	Mulk	Nominated	
2019	64th Filmfare Awards	Best Actress (Critics)	Mulk	Nominated	
2019	Nickelodeon Kids’ Choice Awards 2019	Jodi Kamaal Ki Award (Shared with Bhumi Pednekar)	Saand Ki Aankh	Won	
2020	65th Filmfare Awards	Best Actress (Critics)	Saand Ki Aankh	Won	
2020	26th Screen Awards	Best Actress (Critics)	Saand Ki Aankh	Won	
2020	26th Screen Awards	Best Actress	Badla	Nominated	
2020	Zee Cine Awards	Best Actress (Critics)	Badla	Won	
2020	21st IIFA Awards	Best Actress	Badla	Nominated	
2020	Ananda Vikatan Cinema Awards	Best Actress	Game Over	Won	
2021	66th Filmfare Awards	Best Actress	Thappad	Won	
2021	66th Filmfare Awards	Best Actress (Critics)	Thappad	Nominated	
2022	22nd IIFA Awards	Best Actress	Thappad	Nominated	
2022	67th Filmfare Awards	Best Actress	Rashmi Rocket	Nominated	
2022	67th Filmfare Awards	Best Actress (Critics)	Haseen Dillruba	Nominated	
2022	2022 Filmfare OTT Awards	Best Actress in a Web Original Film	Looop Lapeta	Won	
2023	Bollywood Hungama Style Icons	Most Stylish Actor - People's Choice (Female)	—N/a	Nominated	
2023	Bollywood Hungama Style Icons	Most Stylish Trend Setter (Female)	—N/a	Nominated	
2023	68th Filmfare Awards	Best Actress (Critics)	Shabaash Mithu	Nominated	
2024	69th Filmfare Awards	Best Actress	Dunki	Nominated	
2024	24th IIFA Awards	Best Actress	Dunki	Nominated	
2025	Filmfare OTT Awards	Best Actress in a Web Original Film	Phir Aayi Hasseen Dillruba	Nominated	
