= Nitin Tomar =

Indian kabaddi player

Personal information
- Nationality: Indian
- Born: 30 April 1996 (age 30)
- Home town: Malakpur, Baghpat, Uttar Pradesh, India
- Occupation: Kabaddi Player
- Years active: 2015-present
- Height: 5 ft 9 in (175 cm)

Sport
- Sport: Kabaddi
- Position: Raider
- League: Pro Kabaddi League
- Club: Puneri Paltan; Bengal Warriors; UP Yoddha
- Team: India national kabaddi team

Nitin Tomar is a professional Indian kabaddi player. He leads franchise in the Pro Kabaddi League Season 5 and is a player of the Indian Kabaddi Team (men's division). He is currently a member of the UP Yoddha team. He was the highest-sold player at Pro Kabaddi League Season 5 auction and was sold for 93 lakhs to UP Yoddha

== Early life and background ==
Tomar Hails from Malakpur village in the Baghpat district of Uttar Pradesh. He studied at Maharishi Dayanand Public School. He is from a wrestling background, but had to pursue kabaddi due to lack of wrestling training facilities in his school. His uncle, Rajiv Tomar is an Arjuna awardee wrestler.

As of July 2019, Tomar is pursuing a career in the Indian Navy. He is a resident of Mumbai.

== Career ==
Nitin is a left raider. He made his Pro Kabaddi League debut in 2015 with Bengal Warriors. In 2017, he was sold at 93 lakhs to UP Yoddha in PKL Auction. He became the first player to captain the Yoddhas as they were playing their first season in 2017. He was sold to Puneri Paltan in the 2019 Auction.

He returned to his old franchise, UP Yoddhas in PKL 2022-23.

Nitin played for the Indian team in the 2016 Kabaddi World Cup.
