= Baraut Assembly constituency =

Constituency of the Uttar Pradesh legislative assembly in India

Baraut
- Constituency No. 51 for the Uttar Pradesh Legislative Assembly

Constituency details
- Country: India
- Region: North India
- State: Uttar Pradesh
- District: Bagpat
- Established: 1952-69, 2008
- Total electors: 2,98,711 (2019)
- Reservation: None

Member of Legislative Assembly
- 18th Uttar Pradesh Legislative Assembly
- Incumbent Krishna Pal Malik
- Party: BJP
- Elected year: 2022

Baraut is one of the 403 constituencies of the Uttar Pradesh Legislative Assembly, India. It is a part of the Bagpat district and one of the five assembly constituencies in the Baghpat Lok Sabha constituency. The constituency is assigned identification number 51.

The first election in this assembly constituency was held in 1952 after the passing of the "DPACO (1951)" (delimitation order 1951). Umrao Dutt Sharma (also known as Umrao Dutt Ved), an independent candidate, won the election. After the election of 1969, The Election Commission of India dissolved the constituency, but it was re-established after the "Delimitation of Parliamentary and Assembly Constituencies Order, 2008" was passed. The constituency is currently representated by Krishnapal Malik of the Bharatiya Janata Party.

== History ==
First election in this assembly constituency was held in 1952 after the "SPACE (1951)" (delimitation order 1951) was passed in 1951. Pandit Umrao Dutt Sharma (also known as Umrao Dutt Ved) was a Vaidya and also a member of the freedom fighter from Baraut in Indian Independence Movement. Pandit Jawaharlal Nehru insisted Umrao Dutt Sharma to contest the election and due to respect for Nehru ji, Umrao Dutt Sharma contested the election as an independent candidate. He won the 1952 assembly election by a huge margin and became the first MLA (Member of Legislative Assembly) of Baraut. In 1957, Pandit Umrao Dutt Sharma (also known as Umrao Dutt Ved) retired from active politics and doing election campaigning for Acharya Dipankar. Acharya Dipankar won the election in 1957 with help of Pt. Umrao Dutt Sharma(Umrao Dutt Ved). In 1962, Pandit Umrao Dutt Sharma (also known as Umrao Dutt Ved) Supported the Indian National Congress candidate Mool Chand Shastri in election and with his support Mool Chand Shastri became a Member of Legislative Assembly. In 1967, Mool Chand Shastri lost the election to Acharya Dipankar, but from April 1968 to Feb. 1969 the legislative constituency worked under governor rule. In 1969, Pandit Umrao Dutt Sharma (also known as Umrao Dutt Ved) supported Indian National Congress Candidate Vikram Singh and Vikram Singh won the election. With Umrao Dutt Sharma support, Acharya Dipankar in 1957, Moolchand Shastri in 1962 became Baraut MLA. Umrao Dutt Sharma(also known as Umrao Dutt Ved) political dominance in the Baghpat and Baraut assembly constituencies continued.In 1969, Pandit Umrao Dutt Sharma (also known as Umrao Dutt Ved) supported Indian National Congress Candidate Vikram Singh won the election with help of Umrao Dutt Sharma. In 1977, Umrao Dutt Sharma died. After the election of 1969, The Election Commission of India dissolved the constituency. But in 2008, when the "Delimitation of Parliamentary and Assembly Constituencies Order, 2008" was passed, the constituency was constituted again, and Legislative Assembly elections were held in 2012. In 2012, Lokesh Dixit won the Legislative elections. In 2017, Krishan Pal Malik defeated Lokesh Dixit and became the Member of Legislative Assembly from Baraut. In 2022, Krishan Pal Malik retained his seat by defeating Jaiveer of RLD by 315 votes.

== Wards and areas ==
Extent of Baraut Assembly constituency is PCs Kheri Pradhan, Kotana, Luhari, Loyan, Malakpur, Shahpur Badoli, Sadiqpur Sinoli, Badawad, Sadatpur Jonmana, Bam, Badaka, Wazidpur, Mahawatpur, Jiwana, Bawali, Bijrol, Johari, Hilwari, Jagos of Baraut KC & Baraut MB of Baraut Tehsil; PCs Bali, Meetli, Niwara, Sisana, Gyasri Urf Gandhi, Sarurpur Kalan, Fatehpur Putthi, Dhanaura Silvernagar, Bichpari, Budhera, Naithla, Sultanpur Hatana, Faizpur Ninana, Goripur Jawahar Nagar, Dojha, Sujara, Tayodi & Khera Islampur of Baghpat KC of Baghpat Tehsil.

== Members of the Legislative Assembly ==
Election	Name	Party
1952	Pt. Umrao Dutt Sharma	Independent politician
1957	Acharya Dipankar	Independent politician
1962	Mool Chand Shastri	Indian National Congress
1967	Acharya Dipankar	Communist Party of India
1969	Vikram Singh	Indian National Congress
1974-2012 : Constituency did not exist, See :Barnava
2012	Lokesh Dixit	Bahujan Samaj Party
2017	Krishnapal Malik	Bharatiya Janata Party
2022	Krishnapal Malik	Bharatiya Janata Party

== Election results ==
=== 2027 ===
2027 Uttar Pradesh Legislative Assembly election: Baraut
Party	Candidate	Votes	%	±%
INDIA				
NDA				
BSP				
NOTA	None of the above			
Majority				
Turnout				
gain from		Swing		

=== 2022 ===
2022 Uttar Pradesh Legislative Assembly election: Baraut
Party	Candidate	Votes	%	±%
BJP	Krishnapal Malik	90,931	46.34	▲3.45
RLD	Jaiveer Singh Tomar	90,616	46.18	▲17.59
BSP	Ankit Sharma	11,244	5.73	▼6.19
INC	Rahul Kumar	1,849	0.94	
NOTA	None of the above	579	0.3	▼0.17
Majority		315	0.16	▼14.14
Turnout		196,226	64.51	▲0.22
BJP hold		Swing	3.2	

=== 2017 ===
2017 Uttar Pradesh Legislative Assembly election: Baraut
Party	Candidate	Votes	%	±%
BJP	Krishnapal Malik	79,427	42.89	
RLD	Sahab Singh	52,941	28.59	
SP	Shokendra Tomar	28,376	15.32	
BSP	Lokesh Dixit	22,071	11.92	
NOTA	None of the above	870	0.47	
Majority		26,486	14.3	
Turnout		185,178	64.29	
BJP gain from BSP		Swing	37.2%	

=== 2012 ===
2012 Uttar Pradesh Legislative Assembly election: Baraut
Party	Candidate	Votes	%	±%
BSP	Lokesh Dixit	57,209	39.1	−
RLD	Ashwani Kumar	51,533	35.2	−
SP	Ajay Kumar	15,212	10.4	−
BJP	Navin Kumar	8,395	5.7	−
PECP	Sudhir Verma	5,340	3.7	−
Majority		5,676	3.9%	−
Turnout		1,46,222	58.2%	New seat

== See also ==
- Bagpat district
- List of constituencies of the Uttar Pradesh Legislative Assembly
