= Sah Mal =

Indian independence activist (1797–1857)

Shahmal Singh (also known as Shah Mal) (1797 — 18 July 1857) born in a Hindu family in Bijrol village was a rebel at the time of the Indian Rebellion of 1857, based out of the village of Baraut, Uttar Pradesh. He led the people of Baraut in rebellion against the East India Company.

His clan had kinship connections across 84 villages, in a region which was fertile and prosperous due to irrigated, rich loam soil. However, the British land revenue system caused immense hardship because of its high and rigid tax demands, which led many cultivators to lose their land to traders and moneylenders from outside the area. The resentful villagers were gathered by Shah Mal who rose against the British under his leadership.

The revolt went out of control when the rebels rose up against all signs of oppression. They plundered the houses of moneylenders and traders and the rebels who had been displaced from their lands seized lands from them. The rebel forces attacked government buildings, destroyed a bridge, dug up metalled roads, to destroy the signs of the British authority as well as to cut off British communication.

In June 1857, Sah Mal Singh seized 500 head of cattle, and collected escaped convicts and other locals and formed a force. On 18 July, British forces came under attack as they approached the village of Baraut. A group of fighters led by Sah Mal took up positions in a nearby orchard, and came under pressed attack by a Rifles unit. The formation broke, and were attacked on the flank by mounted troops. Hand-to-hand combat ensued, during which Sah Mal attained martyrdom.
