= Chhaprauli =

- Town
- Location in Uttar Pradesh, India Chhaprauli (India)
- Coordinates: 29.22°N 77.18°E
- Country: India
- State: Uttar Pradesh
- District: Baghpat
- Elevation: 240 m (790 ft)

Population (2001)
  - Total: 17,795

Languages
  - Official: Hindi
- Time zone: UTC+5:30 (IST)
- Postal code: 250617
- Vehicle registration: UP-17
- Website: up.gov.in

Chhaprauli is a town and a nagar panchayat in Baghpat district in the state of Uttar Pradesh, India.

== History ==
Chhaprauli is listed in the Ain-i-Akbari as a pargana under Delhi sarkar, producing a revenue of 1,138,759 dams for the imperial treasury and supplying a force of 300 infantry and 20 cavalry.

== Geography ==
Chhaprauli is located at 29.22°N 77.18°E. It has an average elevation of 240 metres (787 feet). It is located near Yamuna River which makes border with Panipat district of Haryana.

As of 2001 India census, Chhaprauli had a population of 17,795. Males constitute 54% of the population and females 46%. Chhaprauli has an average literacy rate of 56%, lower than the national average of 59.5%; with male literacy of 66% and female literacy of 43%. 15% of the population is under 6 years of age.

Chhaprauli has a sizeable Jat population majorly Khokhar Gotra (which holds the traditional headman ship of Chaubisi Khap) have been dominating the politics of the region for a long time. The most prominent and popular personality related to this town is the late Chaudhary Charan Singh, The only true farmer's leader who served the top post of the country as the prime minister in 1979–80. He started his successful political career from Chhaprauli Assembly in 1937. Since 1937 to till date the family of Chaudhary Charan Singh, and his party member candidate in Assembly election's never got defeated by anyone.
