= Ramala =

Ramala Adarsh Gaon Ramala
- Village
- Location in Uttar Pradesh, India Ramala (India)
- Coordinates: 29.22°N 77.27°E
- Country: India
- State: Uttar Pradesh
- District: Baghpat
- Elevation: 231 m (758 ft)

Language
  - Official: Hindi
  - Additional official: Urdu
- Time zone: UTC+5:30 (IST)
- PIN: 250623
- Telephone code: 01234
- Vehicle registration: UP-17

Ramala is a village in Baghpat District of the Indian state of Uttar Pradesh.

== Pattis ==
Village is divided into nine Pattis:

- Danna Patti
- Haweli wale (Biggest)
- Kabba Patti
- Kamarka Patti
- Bagdi Patti
- Gaal wali Patti
- Nanhiya Patti
