= Prakashi Tomar =

Indian Sharp shooter

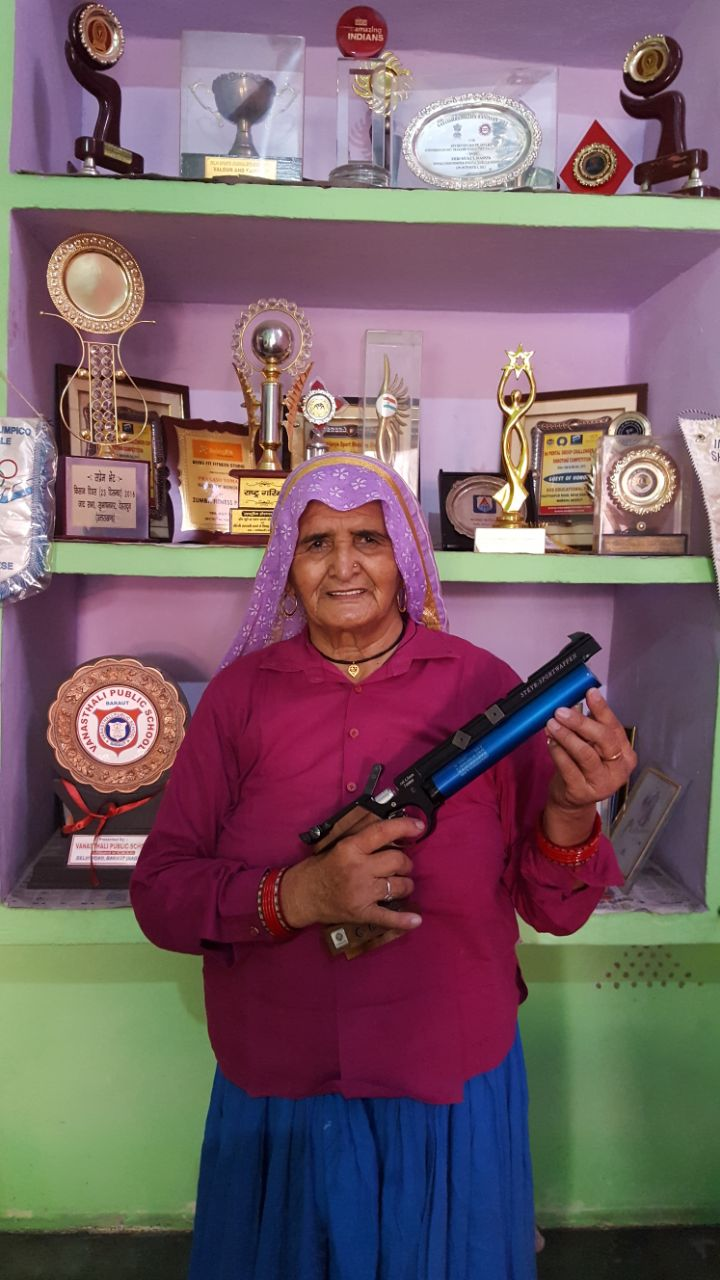
- Born: 1 January 1937 (age 89); Muzaffarnagar, Uttar Pradesh
- Other name: Revolver Dadi (Revolver Grandma)
- Citizenship: Indian
- Occupation: Sharpshooter
Prakashi Tomar
Sport
- Country: India
- Updated on 30 December 2018

Prakashi Tomar (born 1 January 1937) is an Indian sharpshooter from Johri village of Uttar Pradesh's Baghpat district. She is one of the eldest sharpshooters in the world. She is an icon in the world of shooting.

== Personal life ==
Prakashi Tomar was born in a Hindu family. She was married to Jai Singh, and their daughter, Seema Tomar, is an international shooter at present. She is the sister in law of Chandro Tomar. Her granddaughter, Ruby, is deputed as an inspector in Punjab Police, while her second daughter, Rekha, retired as a shooter. She lives in Johri village with her family, and has eight children and twenty grandchildren.

== Career ==
Her career began in 1999 at the age of 62. Her daughter, Seema Tomar, joined the Johri Rifle Club but was hesitant to go alone. Tomar decided to accompany her to the academy as an encouragement. At the academy, coach Farooq Pathan and others were shocked when she shot the target skillfully while trying to show Seema how to hold the gun. Pathan advised her to join the academy, and she has since won over 25 national and international championships.

After two years of training, she entered a competition in which she had to compete against the Deputy Inspector General (DIG) of Delhi Police, Dheeraj Singh. Tomar won the competition but the DIG refused to be photographed with her, and commented: "What photograph, I have been humiliated by a woman."

== Achievements ==
During her career, she received many awards, medal and trophies, along with social honours and the Stree Shakti Puraskar award conferred by then President of India Pranab Mukherjee. Tomar was selected in the #100Women_Achievers in India campaign launched in collaboration with Facebook, recognizing women who have contributed to their community and nation building. As such, Tomar was felicitated by President Pranab Mukherjee at Rashtrapati Bhavan on 22 January 2016. She was also felicitated with the Icon Lady award by the Ministry of Women and Child Development in 2017.

== In popular culture ==
- Saand Ki Aankh (2019) — a biopic movie starring Taapsee Pannu and Bhumi Pednekar

== See also ==
- Chandro Tomar, the formerly oldest female shooter from the same village
