= Baghpat =

Baghpat Vyaghraprastha
- City
- Location in Uttar Pradesh, India Baghpat (India)
- Coordinates: 28.95°N 77.22°E
- Country: India
- State: Uttar Pradesh
- District: Baghpat

Government
  - Type: Municipal Board
  - Body: Nagar Palika Parishad Baghpat
- Elevation: 253 m (830 ft)

Population (2011)
  - Total: 50,310
  - Density: 986/km^{2} (2,550/sq mi)

Language
  - Official: Hindi
  - Additional official: Urdu
  - Spoken: Khadiboli
- Time zone: UTC+5:30 (IST)
- Postal code: 250609
- Vehicle registration: UP-17
- Website: bagpat.nic.in

Baghpat, historically known as Vyaghraprastha, is a city in the Indian state of Uttar Pradesh. It is the administrative headquarters of Bagpat district, which was established in 1997. It is part of the National Capital Region, surrounding New Delhi.

== Etymology ==
The original name of the city was Vyaghraprastha (Sanskrit: व्याघ्रप्रस्थ, meaning tiger city) because of the large number of tigers in that area. It is also mentioned as Vyaghraprastha in the Indian epic Mahabharata, one of the five villages that Krishna demanded from Hastinapur on behalf of the Pandavas, so as to avert the war.

During the Mughal Era, the city was named as Baghpat (Hindustani: बाग़पत) by emperors in Delhi, in reference to the city's gardens.

== History ==
Baghpat is listed in the Ain-i-Akbari as a pargana under Delhi sarkar, as producing a revenue of 3,532,368 dams for the imperial treasury and supplying a force of 200 infantry and 20 cavalry.

== Geography ==

Baghpat is located in western Uttar Pradesh, on the east bank of the Yamuna river. It is approximately 32 kilometres (20 mi) northeast of Delhi and 48 kilometres (30 mi) west of Meerut, on the main Delhi–Saharanpur highway. Baghpat is the headquarters of Baghpat district, which is in the shape of a north–south rectangle. To the north of Baghpat district are Shamli and Muzaffarnagar district, to the east Meerut district, to the south Ghaziabad district, and to the west, across the Yamuna, Delhi, and Sonipat district in Haryana state.

== Demographics ==
As of the 2011 Census of India, Baghpat's 7880 households included a population of 50,310 of which 26,435 were males and 23,875 were females. 8,781 children ranged in age from 0 to 6. The literacy rate in Baghpat was 50.7%, with male literacy of 56.9% and female literacy of 43.8%. The effective literacy rate of the 7+ population of Baghpat was 61.43%, of which the male literacy rate was 68.9% and the female literacy rate was 53.1%. The Scheduled Caste population was 2,337. In 2011.

== Administration ==
Bhagpat includes three towns—a municipal council (Baghpat itself), and two notified area, or city, councils (Baraut, Khekhda and Baghpat)—within the tehsil, as well as 103 villages.

The chairman of Baghpat's Nagar Palika Parishad is Riazuddin (3rd term). The district magistrate is Asmita Lal. and the superintendent of police is Suraj Kumar Rai.

== List of villages ==
- Bharal
- Kheriki
- Ramala

== Education ==
- JagMohan Institute of Management and Technology

== Notable people ==
- Yogesh Dhama - politician
- Satya Pal Malik - politician
- Satya Pal Singh - politician
