= Baraut =

- City
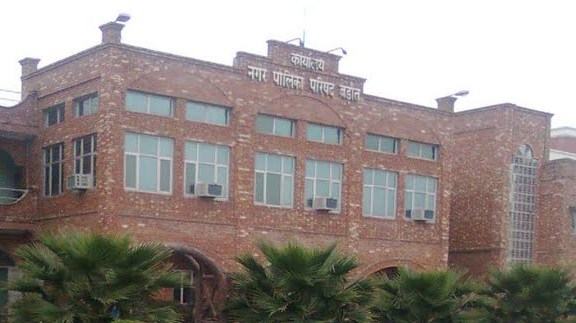
- Office of Baraut Municipality

- Location within Uttar Pradesh Location within India
- Coordinates: 29°10′02″N 77°26′29″E
- Country: India
- State: Uttar Pradesh
- Division: Meerut
- District: Baghpat

Government
  - Body: Municipality
  - Chairperson: Babita Tomar

Area
  - Total: 10.36 km^{2} (4.00 sq mi)
- Elevation: 231 m (758 ft)

Population (2011)
  - Total: 103,764

Language
  - Official: Hindi
  - Additional official: Urdu
  - Regional: Khariboli
- Time zone: UTC+5:30 (IST)
- PIN: 250611
- Telephone code: 91-1234 xxx xxx
- Vehicle registration: UP-17
- Sex ratio: 70.22% ♂/51.12% ♀
- Literacy rate: Crude (66.2%), Effective (76.7%)

Baraut is a city and municipal board in Baghpat district, Uttar Pradesh, India.

== Name ==
According to Paul Whalley, the name Baṛaut is derived from baṛ, one of the Hindi-Urdu names for the banyan tree, plus the Sanskrit possessive suffix -vat (which has often been shortened to -aut in modern place names), so the name originally meant "having banyan trees".

== History ==
Baraut is a very old town. It was already a major town of the United Provinces during the 19th century, in the Baraut Paraganah of Meerut district. In the early 19th century, it was a part of Begum Samru's estate, and later, was majorly affected by the 1857 rebellion. During the 19th and early 20th centuries, Baraut was known for the manufacture of buckets and cauldrons from iron.

== Geography ==
map of Uttar Pradesh constituency 51-Baraut

Baraut is located at 29.6°N 77.16°E, covering an area of 10.36 square kilometres (4.00 sq mi) and lying between the Ganga and Yamuna river plains. Its average elevation is 231 m (758 feet). Baraut is served by NH-709B and state highways SH-57 and SH-82.

Baraut is located 55 kilometers (34 mi) from Delhi (the national capital of India) and 55 kilometers from Meerut, and is within the National Capital Region (NCR).

== Demographics ==
=== Population ===
As of 2011 Indian Census, Baraut had a total population of 103,764, of which 55,013 were males and 48,751 were females. Population within the age group of 0 to 6 years was 14,149. The total number of literates in Baraut was 68,690, which constituted 66.2% of the population with male literacy of 71.8% and female literacy of 59.9%. The effective literacy rate of 7+ population of Baraut was 76.7%, of which male literacy rate was 83.5% and female literacy rate was 69.0%. The Scheduled Castes population was 6,357. Baraut had 17924 in 2011.

=== Religion ===
Religion in Baraut City
Religion	Percent
Hinduism	58.10%
Islam	31.47%
Jainism	9.99%
Others	0.45%

Most people in the city are followers of Hinduism, with significant population of Muslims and Jains.

Baraut is a multi-religious place with 32 temples, 21 mosques, 1 gurdwara, and 2 churches in Baraut city.

=== Languages ===
The official languages of the city is Hindi, and Urdu is the additional official language. Khariboli (similar to Haryanvi) is the regional Hindi dialect spoken in Baraut and the adjoining area.

== Administration and politics ==
Baraut is one of the 403 constituencies of the Uttar Pradesh Legislative Assembly, India. The first election of this assembly constituency was held in 1952. Umrao Dutt Sharma (also known as Umrao Dutt Ved), an Indian Independence activist, won the 1952 assembly election by a huge margin and became the first Member of Legislative Assembly (MLA) of Baraut. After the 1969 elections, the constituency was dissolved. In 2008, when the "Delimitation of Parliamentary and Assembly Constituencies Order, 2008" was passed, the constituency was re-constituted and elections were held in 2012. The constituency is assigned identification number 51. Krishan Pal Malik of BJP is the MLA after winning second consecutive term in 2017 and 2022. Babita Tomar is the chairman of the Municipal Council of Baraut City.

Baraut is the largest city in the Bagpat district. Bagpat district was formed in 1997; prior to that, Baraut was a major tehsil within Meerut district.

=== Villages in Baraut tehsil ===
- Alawalpur
- Baoli
- Gopalpur Khadana
- Nagla Rawa

== Education ==
Baraut is home to the Janta Vedic College, which was established as a high school in 1917, turned into a college in 1949, and a postgraduate college in 1956. The college is affiliated with the Chaudhary Charan Singh University.

== See also ==
- Asara, India
- Kishanpur baral
- List of cities in Uttar Pradesh
