= Bagpat district =

District of Uttar Pradesh in India

- District
- Location of Baghpat district in Uttar Pradesh
- Country: India
- State: Uttar Pradesh
- Division: Meerut
- Headquarters: Baghpat

Government
  - Lok Sabha constituencies: Baghpat
  - Vidhan Sabha: Chhaprauli, Baraut, Bagpat

Area
  - Total: 1,321 km^{2} (510 sq mi)

Population (2011)
  - Total: 1,303,048
  - Density: 986.4/km^{2} (2,555/sq mi)

Language
  - Official: Hindi
  - Additional official: Urdu

Demographics
  - Literacy: 72.01 per cent
  - Sex ratio: 861
- Time zone: UTC+05:30 (IST)
- Major highways: NH 334, NH 709B
- Website: bagpat.nic.in

Bagpat district, also spelled as Baghpat district, is one of the 75 districts of the Indian state of Uttar Pradesh, with headquarters at the town of Baghpat. It is within the National Capital Region. Created in 1997, the district has an area of 1,321 square kilometres (510 sq mi). Baghpat has a population of 1,303,048 as of 2011 census.

== History ==
The ancient name of the city of Baghpat, Vyaghraprastha, derives its name either from vyagprastha ("land of tigers") or from vakyaprasth ("place for delivering speeches"). The city was finally named Baghpat (Hindustani: बाग़पत, باغپت) during the Mughal era of India, after the city's gardens. Starting from a small commercial center known as the Mandi, the city grew in importance after the 1857 mutiny and became the headquarters of Baghpat tehsil. Baghpat has a rich historical significance, particularly in the context of India's struggle for independence. The district provided shelter to several key freedom fighters. Notably, Chandrashekhar Azad sought refuge in Baghpat after the Kakori Train Action, a significant event in the Indian independence movement. Additionally, Subhas Chandra Bose visited Baraut city of Baghpat district in his efforts to recruit new members for his army, the Indian National Army (INA), during his fight against British colonial rule.

Baghpat district was created on 17 September 1997 and named after the erstwhile Baghpat tehsil of Meerut district.

== Geography ==
The district has an area of 1,321 square kilometres (510 sq mi). Baghpat town lies on the east bank of the Yamuna River and is within the National Capital Region.

It borders Sonipat and Panipat districts of Haryana; Meerut, Muzaffarnagar, Shamli, and Ghaziabad districts of Uttar Pradesh; and the National Capital Territory of Delhi

It is 40 kilometres (25 mi) from Delhi, the national capital, 52 kilometres (32 mi) from Meerut, and 55 kilometres (34 mi) from Ghaziabad.

=== Water quality issues ===
Bagpat district, along with other districts in western Uttar Pradesh, faces significant challenges regarding water quality. The National Green Tribunal (NGT) has been addressing these issues, particularly concerning heavy metal contamination in groundwater.

The NGT has criticised local authorities for failing to provide clean drinking water to residents despite multiple directives. Reports indicate dangerously high levels of arsenic in the groundwater, posing severe health risks, including cancer and physical deformities. In the village of Jalalpur, arsenic levels were found to be 40 mg/l, 4000 times the acceptable limit.

There have been serious physical disabilities observed in children due to contaminated water. Villages along the Hindon, Krishni, and Kali rivers are particularly affected, with residents suffering from skin diseases, congenital deformities, and cancer due to heavy metals and toxins in the water.

The Central Ground Water Board (CGWB) has reported declining groundwater levels and quality issues in Bagpat district, particularly in Binauli, Pilana, and Khekra blocks. About 96.60% of the net irrigated area relies on groundwater.

To address these challenges, the NGT has ordered scientific studies of groundwater quality and directed the Uttar Pradesh Jal Nigam to ensure the supply of clean drinking water to affected villages. These measures are crucial for safeguarding public health and ensuring sustainable water management in Bagpat district.

== Demographics ==
Historical population
Year	Pop.	±% p.a.
1901	347,045	—
1911	342,354	−0.14%
1921	341,292	−0.03%
1931	364,792	+0.67%
1941	431,893	+1.70%
1951	519,483	+1.86%
1961	606,642	+1.56%
1971	701,493	+1.46%
1981	852,462	+1.97%
1991	1,030,399	+1.91%
2001	1,163,991	+1.23%
2011	1,303,050	+1.13%

According to the 2011 census, Bagpat district has a population of 1,303,048, which is roughly equal to that of African nation of Mauritius or the US state of New Hampshire. This gives it a ranking of the 376th most populous districts in India (out of a total of 640). The district has a population density of 986 inhabitants per square kilometre (2,550/sq mi) . Its population growth rate over the decade 2001–2011 was 11.87%. Bagpat has a sex ratio of 858 females for every 1000 males, and a literacy rate of 73.54%. 21.11% of the population lived in urban areas. Scheduled Castes make up 11.44% of the population.

Religions in Bagpat district (2011)
Religion	Percent
Hinduism	70.41%
Islam	27.98%
Jainism	1.24%
Other or not stated	0.37%
Distribution of religions

Baghpat is a Hindu-majority district, with about 70% Hindu population and 28% Muslim population. Jains make up over 1% of the population.

Languages of Bagpat district (2011)
1. Hindi (96.7%)
2. Urdu (2.54%)
3. Others (0.72%)

96.74% of the population of the district spoke Hindi, and 2.54% Urdu, as their first language.

== Administration ==
=== Legislative constituencies ===
The current Member of the Legislative Assembly (MLA) of the Uttar Pradesh Vidhan Sabha for Baghpat is Yogesh Dhama; the MLA for Baraut is Krishan Pal Malik; and the MLA for Chhaprauli is Ajay Kumar. All of these state-legislature constituencies are part of the Baghpat Lok Sabha constituency whose MP is Rajkumar Sangwan.

=== District administration ===
The present district magistrate of Baghpat is Asmita Lal and superintendent of Baghpat Police is Suraj Kumar Rai Additional district magistrate is Vinit Upadhyay and chief development officer is Anil Kumar Singh. Rahul Bhati is the district information officer.

=== Tehsils and blocks ===
Bagpat district is divided into 3 tehsils: Baghpat, Baraut, and Khekra. Baghpat tehsil comprises two blocks – Baghpat and Pilana; while Baraut comprises three – Binauli, Chhaprauli, and Baraut. Khekra tehsil comprises only the Khekra block. Baghpat, Baraut, Doghat Rural and Khekada are the major towns in the district.

=== Villages ===
- Badagaon
- Baoli
- Baraut
- Bijrol
- Bodha
- Budhpur
- Chamrawal
- Faizpur Ninana
- Katha
- Ramala
- Tyodhi

== Economy ==
Baghpat town has an agriculture-based economy where sugarcane is a main crop. There are sugar mills in Baghpat, Ramala and Malakpur. Wheat, mustard, and vegetables are also extensively grown. The district is known for its home furnishing industry, which produces items like bedsheets, towels and mattresses, that are supplied across the country.

== Education ==
Colleges located in Baghpat include:

- JagMohan Institute of Management and Technology
- Janta Vedic College

== Notable people ==
- Yuvika Chaudhary, actress
- Saurabh Kumar, cricketer
- Sah Mal, freedom fighter who led the 1857 mutiny from Baghpat
- Satya Pal Malik, politician, serving as the 21st Governor of Meghalaya
- Rajendra Singh, social worker
- Satya Pal Singh, former minister
- Shirash Pal Singh, chief coach of Indian national kabaddi team (Asian and SAF Games gold medalist)
- Chandro Tomar, sharpshooter
- Nitin Tomar, professional Indian kabaddi player
- Prakashi Tomar, sharpshooter
- Sachin Yadav, athlete
