= Electoral history of Charan Singh =

Elections featuring Prime Minister of India

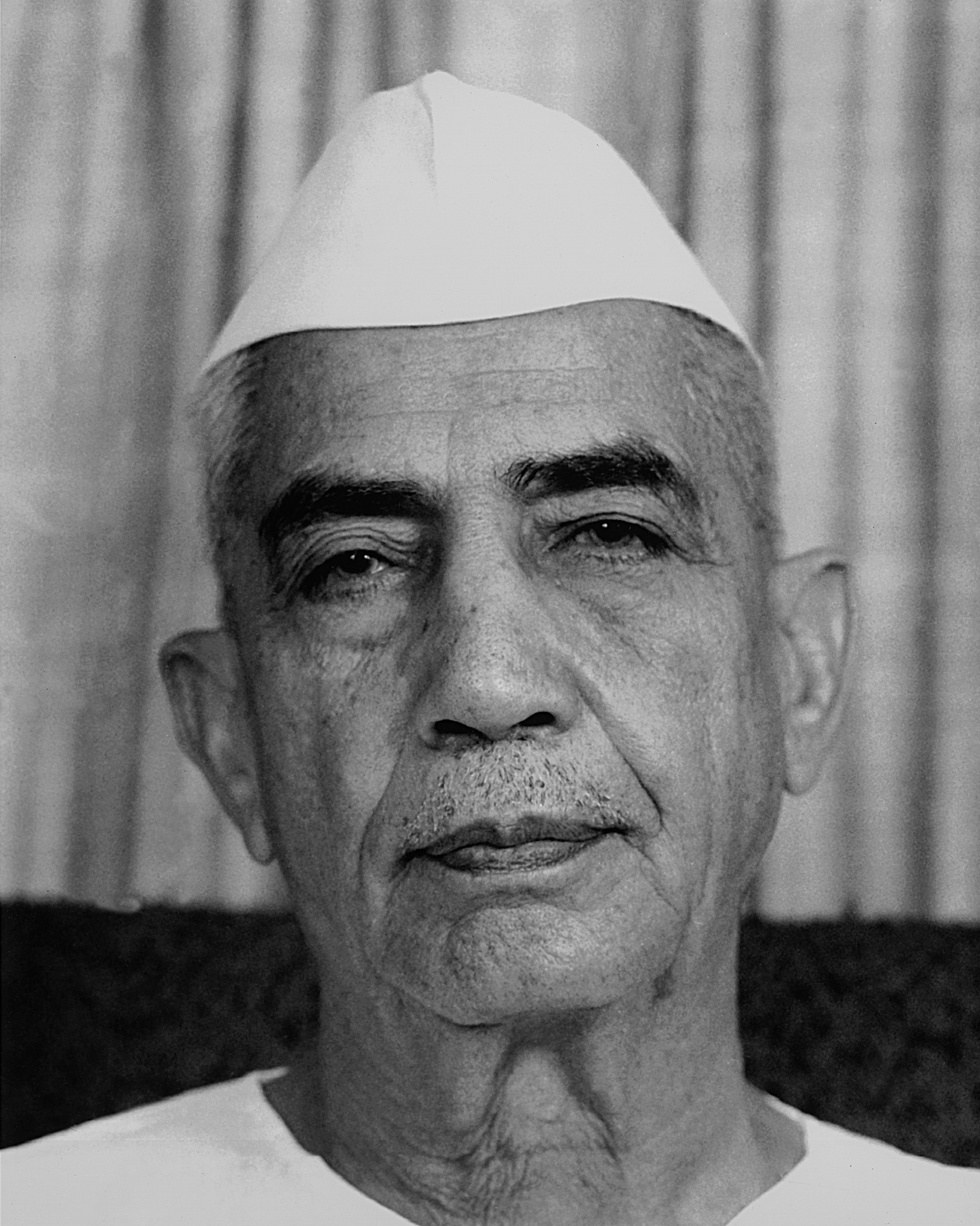
Chaudhary Charan Singh in 1979

This is the electoral history of Chaudhary Charan Singh. Charan Singh served as the prime minister of India from July 1979 to August 1979 and deputy prime minister of India from January 1979 to July 1979. He served as union minister of home affairs from March 1977 to July 1978 and union minister of finance from 1979 to 1980. He was also a two term chief minister of Uttar Pradesh between 1967 and 1970.

Singh began his political journey in the 1930s as part of the Indian Independence Movement. He was elected to the Uttar Province Legislative Assembly in 1937 as a member of the Indian National Congress (INC).

After independence, Singh initially continued as a Congress leader and won multiple assembly elections in Uttar Pradesh in year 1952, 1957, 1962, 1967. He held several cabinet ministerial positions in Uttar Pradesh Legislative Assembly. Singh left the Congress party in 1967 and formed the Bharatiya Kranti Dal (BKD). His party gained significant traction, and he became the Chief Minister of Uttar Pradesh in 1967 with the support of a non-Congress coalition. However, his tenure was short-lived, as he resigned in 1968. In 1969, he reformed his BKD party and contested the elections, returning as Uttar Pradesh Chief Minister in 1970 with the support of the Congress.

During the Emergency (1975–77), Singh was imprisoned for opposing Indira Gandhi's authoritarian rule. After the Emergency, he played a key role in forming the Janata Party, which won the 1977 general elections. He became the deputy prime minister and home minister in Desai government. After internal conflicts within the Janata Party, Singh was backed by Indira Gandhi's Congress (I) to become the 5th prime minister of India on 28 July 1979. However, he never faced Parliament for a vote of confidence, as Congress withdrew support, leading to his resignation on 14 January 1980.

In 1980, Singh founded the Lok Dal, which emerged as a strong farmer-based party. He contested the 1980 and 1984 general elections, but his party could not challenge the dominance of Congress. His last electoral contest was in 1984, which he won but due to deteriorating health, he gradually withdrew from active politics. In his whole career he contested nine elections, out of which six were state assembly elections while three were Lok Sabha elections and he won all these nine elections.

== Summary ==
Charan Singh in his career contested nine elections, out of which six of them were assembly elections while three were general parliamentary elections and he won all these nine elections.

=== Uttar Pradesh Legislative Assembly elections ===
Year	Constituency	Party	Votes	%	Result	Opponent	Margin
1952	Baghpat West	INC	18,298		Won	Raghubir Singh	8420
1957	Kotana	INC	27,075		Won	Vijaipal Singh	624
1962	Kotana	INC	33,912		Won	Shyam Lal	26,641
1967	Chhaprauli	INC	59,199		Won	S. Singh	52,188
1969	Chhaprauli	BKD	62,419		Won	Munshi Ram	47,940
1974	Chhaprauli	BKD	54,348		Won	Pritam Singh	26,533

=== Lok Sabha elections ===
Year	Constituency	Party	Votes	%	Result	Opponent	Margin
1977	Baghpat	BKD	286,301		Won	Ram Chandra Vikal	121,538
1980	Baghpat	JP(S)	323,077		Won	Ram Chandra Vikal	165,121
1984	Baghpat	LKD	253,463		Won	Mahesh Chand	85,674

== Lok Sabha elections ==
=== General election 1984 ===
1984 Indian general elections: Baghpat
Party	Candidate	Votes	%	±%
LKD	Charan Singh	253,463	52.9	
INC	Mahesh Chand	167,789	35.0	
Independent	Raj Narain	33,664	7.0	
Majority		85,674	17.9	
Turnout				
Registered electors				

=== General election 1980 ===
1980 Indian general elections: Baghpat
Party	Candidate	Votes	%	±%
JP(S)	Charan Singh	323,077	64.4	
INC	Ram Chandra Vikal	157,956	31.5	
Majority				
Turnout				
Registered electors				

=== General election 1977 ===
1977 Indian general elections: Baghpat
Party	Candidate	Votes	%	±%
BLD	Charan Singh	286,301	62.7	
INC	Ram Chandra Vikal	164,763	36.1	
Majority				
Turnout				
Registered electors				

== Uttar Pradesh Legislative assembly elections ==
=== 1974 ===
1974 Uttar Pradesh Legislative Assembly elections: Chhaprauli
Party	Candidate	Votes	%	Result
Bharatiya Kranti Dal	Charan Singh	54,348	63.44	Won
Indian National Congress	Pritam Singh	27,815	32.47	Lost
IND	Jasvir Singh	1,369	1.6	Lost
IND	Dasa Ram	1,101	1.29	Lost
IND	Kubadi	620	0.72	Lost
IND	Bhoopal	410	0.48	Lost

=== 1969 ===
1969 Uttar Pradesh Legislative Assembly elections: Chhaprauli
Party	Candidate	Votes	%	Result
Bharatiya Kranti Dal	Charan Singh	62,419	78.78	Won
Indian National Congress	Munshi Ram	14,479	18.27	Lost
IND	Banwari Lal	1,769	2.23	Lost
IND	Suraj Mal	562	0.71	Lost

=== 1967 ===
1967 Uttar Pradesh Legislative Assembly elections: Chhaprauli
Party	Candidate	Votes	%	Result
Indian National Congress	Charan Singh	59,199	85.35	Won
IND	S. Singh	7,011	10.10	Lost
IND	N. Singh	1,635	2.36	Lost
IND	Jai Prakash	1,508	2.17	Lost

=== 1962 ===
1962 Uttar Pradesh Legislative Assembly elections: Kotana
Party	Candidate	Votes	%	Result
Indian National Congress	Charan Singh	33,912	69.65	Won
IND	Shyam Lal	7,271	14.93	Lost
IND	Anup Singh	4,400	9.04	Lost
IND	Vijendra	2,569	5.28	Lost
IND	Sukhbir	535	1.10	Lost

=== 1957 ===
1957 Uttar Pradesh Legislative Assembly elections: Kotana
Party	Candidate	Votes	%	Result
Indian National Congress	Charan Singh	27,075	50.58	Won
IND	Vijaipal Singh	26,451	49.41	Lost

=== 1952 ===
1952 Uttar Pradesh Legislative Assembly elections: Baghpat West
Party	Candidate	Votes	%	Result
Indian National Congress	Charan Singh	18,298	45.75	Won
IND	Raghubir Singh	9,878	24.70	Lost
KMPP	Pritam Singh	8,314	20.79	Lost
BJS	Onkar Datt	3,498	8.75	Lost
