= Baghpat Lok Sabha constituency =

Lok Sabha Constituency in Uttar Pradesh

Coordinates: 28.94°N 77.22°E

Baghpat
- Lok Sabha constituency
- Interactive Map Outlining Baghpat Lok Sabha constituency

Constituency details
- Country: India
- Region: North India
- State: Uttar Pradesh
- Assembly constituencies: Siwalkhas; Chhaprauli; Baraut; Baghpat; Modi Nagar
- Established: 1967
- Total electors: 16,83,283
- Reservation: None

Member of Parliament
- 18th Lok Sabha
- Incumbent Rajkumar Sangwan
- Party: RLD
- Alliance: NDA
- Elected year: 2024

Baghpat (Hindi pronunciation: [baːgpət̪], also [baːɣpət̪]) is one of the 80 Lok Sabha (lower house of parliament) constituencies in Uttar Pradesh state in India. This seat is considered a bastion for the Charan Singh family.

== History ==
Baghpat constituency in western Uttar Pradesh emerged in 1967. The constituency’s social and economic landscape, built around sugarcane agriculture, canal irrigation, and a strong rural community structure, shaped its early political character. In early days this constituency high political influenced by the two person Umrao Dutt Sharma ( also known as Umrao Dutt Ved) and Chaudhary Charan Singh. The constituency’s social and economic landscape, built around sugarcane agriculture, canal irrigation, and a strong rural community structure, shaped its early political character. In 1967, Raghuvir Singh Shastri won the election with the support of Umrao dutt sharma as Independent Candidate. In 1970, Indra Gandhi invite Umrao Dutt Sharma to discuss the candidate at Delhi and the Congress party announced Ram Chandra Vikal as candidate. Umrao Dutt Sharma helps Ram Chandra Vikal in election campaigning and Ram Chandra Vikal won the election. But the scenarios changes in 1975 when Emergency was announced by Congress party and Umrao Dutt Sharma died in 1977. In 1977 the Baghpat became closely tied to the legacy of Chaudhary Charan Singh, one of India’s greatest peasant leaders, whose politics centred on agrarian interests, land reforms, and rural empowerment. His repeated victories from the seat established Baghpat as a national symbol of farmer-led political mobilisation and embedded the Chaudhary Charan Singh family firmly in the constituency’s identity.

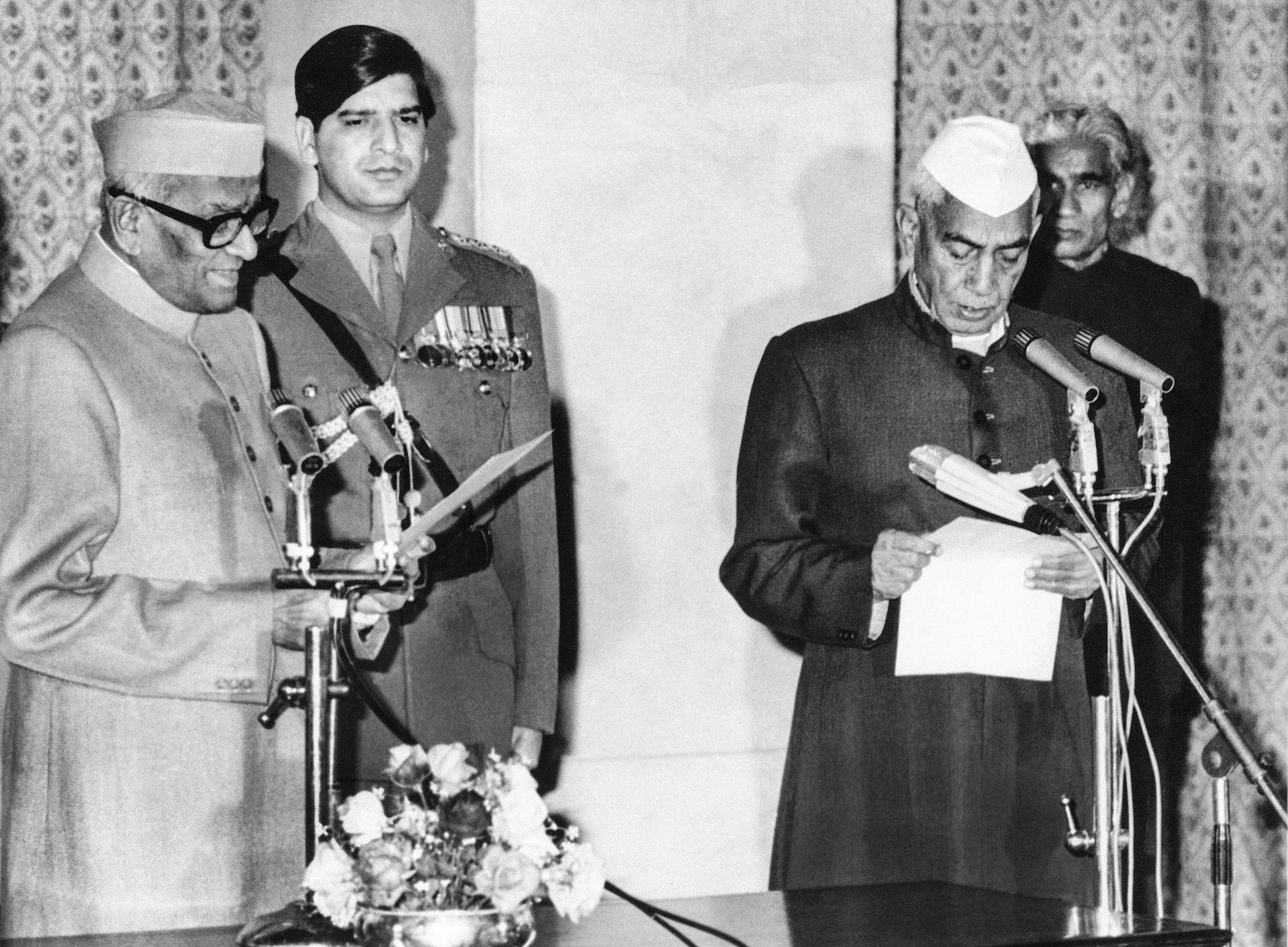
Charan Singh swearing in as Prime Minister of India in 1979

After Charan Singh’s era, the seat passed naturally into the hands of his son, Ajit Singh, who maintained dominance for more than two decades. Through shifting alliances involving the Lok Dal, Janata Dal factions, and later the Rashtriya Lok Dal (RLD), Ajit Singh turned Baghpat into a stronghold of farmer-centric regional politics. His influence was backed by a cohesive Jat voter base, a disciplined party organisation, and his continued presence in national politics as a Union minister in several governments. Throughout the 1990s and 2000s, Baghpat electoral outcomes often reflected broader farmer concerns such as sugarcane pricing, procurement issues, irrigation needs, and rural infrastructure.

The political landscape of Baghpat began to change in the 2010s as national parties, especially the Bharatiya Janata Party (BJP), started consolidating their influence in western Uttar Pradesh. It led to Ajit Singh’s defeat in 2014 at the hands of Dr. Satyapal Singh, a former Mumbai Police Commissioner. This result marked a significant turning point, ending nearly four decades of uninterrupted dominance by the Charan Singh family. In 2019, the BJP retained the constituency.

Despite these shifts, Baghpat has continued to be shaped by its agrarian identity, its caste-based coalition patterns, and its strategic location in the National Capital Region. The 2024 general election saw another shift when the Rashtriya Lok Dal (RLD) regained the constituency under Rajkumar Sangwan.

== Assembly segments ==
Presently, after reorganisation, this Lok Sabha constituency comprises the following five Vidhan Sabha segments.

No	Name	District	Member	Party	2024 Lead
43	Siwalkhas	Meerut	Ghulam Muhammad	RLD	RLD
50	Chhaprauli	Baghpat	Ajay Kumar Tomar	RLD	RLD
51	Baraut	Baghpat	Krishnapal Malik	BJP	RLD
52	Baghpat	Baghpat	Yogesh Dhama	BJP	RLD
57	Modinagar	Ghaziabad	Manju Shiwach	BJP	RLD

== Members of Parliament ==
Year	Member	Party
1967	Raghuvir Singh Shastri	Independent politician
1971	Ram Chandra Vikal	Indian National Congress
1977	Charan Singh	Janata Party
1980	Charan Singh	Janata Party (Secular)
1984	Charan Singh	Lok Dal
1989	Ajit Singh	Janata Dal
1991	Ajit Singh	Janata Dal
1996	Ajit Singh	Indian National Congress
1997	Ajit Singh	Bharatiya Kisan Kamgar Party
1998	Sompal Shastri	Bharatiya Janata Party
1999	Ajit Singh	Rashtriya Lok Dal
2004	Ajit Singh	Rashtriya Lok Dal
2009	Ajit Singh	Rashtriya Lok Dal
2014	Satya Pal Singh	Bharatiya Janata Party
2019	Satya Pal Singh	Bharatiya Janata Party
2024	Rajkumar Sangwan	Rashtriya Lok Dal

== Election results ==
Vote share of Winning candidates
2024	52.36%
2019	50.32%
2014	42.15%
2009	38.88%
2004	53.76%
1999	48.25%
1998	37.00%
1996	52.71%
1991	61.08%
1989	70.32%
1984	53.72%
1980	65.21%
1977	63.47%
1971	51.00%
1967	50.15%

=== 2024 ===
2024 Indian general election: Baghpat
Party	Candidate	Votes	%	±%
RLD	Rajkumar Sangwan	488,967	52.36	▲4.29
SP	Amarpal Sharma	3,29,508	35.29	▲35.29
BSP	Praveen Bansal	92,266	9.88	▲9.88
AAS	Mukesh Kumar Sharma	5,523	0.59	▲0.59
NOTA	None of the above	5,110	0.55	▲0.07
Majority		1,59,459	17.08	▲14.83
Turnout		9,33,773	56.48	▼8.20
RLD gain from BJP		Swing		

=== 2019 ===
2019 Indian general elections: Baghpat
Party	Candidate	Votes	%	±%
BJP	Satya Pal Singh	525,789	50.32	▲8.17
RLD	Jayant Chaudhary	5,02,287	48.07	▲28.21
NOTA	None of the Above	5,041	0.48	▲0.09
Margin of victory		23,502	2.25	▼18.64
Turnout		10,45,607	64.68	▼2.07
BJP hold		Swing	▲8.17	

=== 2014 ===
2014 Indian general elections: Baghpat
Party	Candidate	Votes	%	±%
BJP	Satya Pal Singh	423,475	42.15	▲42.15
SP	Ghulam Mohammed	2,13,654	21.26	▲13.82
RLD	Ajit Singh	1,99,516	19.86	▼19.02
BSP	Prashant Chaudhary	1,41,743	14.11	▼14.50
AAP	Somendar Dhaka	5,828	0.58	▲0.58
NOTA	None of the Above	3,911	0.39	▲0.39
Margin of victory		2,09,866	20.89	▲10.62
Turnout		10,04,766	66.75	▲18.83
BJP gain from RLD		Swing	▲3.27	

=== 2009 ===
2009 Indian general elections: Baghpat
Party	Candidate	Votes	%	±%
RLD	Ajit Singh	238,638	38.88	
BSP	Mukesh Sharma	1,75,611	28.61	
INC	Sompal Shastri	1,36,964	22.32	
SP	Sahab Singh	45,644	7.44	
Independent	Vedpal Singh	5,838	0.95	
Margin of victory		63,027	10.27	
Turnout		6,13,748	47.92	
RLD hold		Swing		

=== 2004 ===
2004 Indian general elections: Baghpat
Party	Candidate	Votes	%	±%
RLD	Ajit Singh	353,181	53.76	▲5.50
BSP	Chaudhary Aulad Ali	1,32,543	20.18	▲6.85
BJP	Satya Pal Malik	1,02,317	15.58	▼11.85
INC	Jagveer Singh	55,164	8.40	0
Independent	Habib Ahmad	4,919	0.75	0
INLD	Samar Pal	2,489	0.38	0
Independent	Subhash	1,520	0.23	0
RPI	Krishna Bhagwan Swami	994	0.15	0
Majority		2,20,638	33.58	▲5.50
Turnout		6,56,900	41.83	
RLD hold		Swing		

=== 1999 ===
1999 Indian general election: Baghpat
Party	Candidate	Votes	%	±%
RLD	Ajit Singh	358,069	48.25	
BJP	Sompal Shastri	203,650	27.44	
BSP	Tekchand Kumar	98,900	13.33	
SP	Mirajuddin Ahmed	59,807	8.06	
IND	11 Independent Candidates	16,848	2.27	
OTH	4 Other Party Candidates	4,789	0.64	
Majority		154,419	20.81	
Turnout		754,521	57.11	
Swing to RLD from BJP		Swing		

=== 1998 ===
1998 Indian general election: Baghpat
Party	Candidate	Votes	%	±%
BJP	Sompal Shastri	264,736	37.00	
BKKGP	Ajit Singh	220,030	30.75	
SP	Mirajuddin Ahmed	134,696	18.82	
BSP	Ajay Singh	79,153	11.06	
IND	6 Independent Candidates	10,017	1.40	
OTH	3 Other Party Candidates	6,953	0.97	
Majority		44,706	6.25	
Turnout		723,466	55.61	
Swing to BJP from Bharatiya Kisan Kamgar Party		Swing		

=== 1996 ===
1996 Indian general election: Baghpat
Party	Candidate	Votes	%	±%
INC	Ajit Singh	348,600	52.71	
SP	Mukhia Gurjar	149,709	22.64	
BJP	Veer Sain Saroha	93,628	14.16	
BSP	Charan Singh Tyagi	55,869	8.45	
AIIC(T)	Rishipal	4,857	0.73	
IND	22 Independent Candidates	6,687	1.03	
OTH	3 Other Party Candidates	1,948	0.30	
Majority		198,891	30.07	
Turnout		666,928	52.47	
Swing to INC from JD		Swing		

=== 1991 ===
1991 Indian general election: Baghpat
Party	Candidate	Votes	%	±%
JD	Ajit Singh	288,742	61.08	
INC	Zile Singh	91,634	19.38	
BJP	Ranveer Singh	72,425	15.32	
JP	Om Pal Singh	15,578	3.30	
IND	Maharaj	1,727	0.37	
IND	Vikram	726	0.15	
IND	Kaka Jogender Singh	490	0.10	
IND	Dharam Pal	478	0.10	
LTP (Note: Akhil Bharatiya Loktantra Party)	Himanchal Rai	408	0.09	
DDP	Mahendra	326	0.07	
IND	Sukhvir Singh	175	0.04	
Majority		197,108	41.70	
Turnout		482,277	51.46	
JD hold		Swing		

=== 1989 ===
1989 Indian general election: Baghpat
Party	Candidate	Votes	%	±%
JD	Ajit Singh	400,053	70.32	
INC	Mahesh Sharma	155,406	27.32	
IND	Om Prakash	5,832	1.03	
IND	6 Independent Candidates	5,654	0.98	
OTH	3 Other Party Candidates	1,932	0.34	
Majority		244,647	43.00	
Turnout		578,085	62.68	
Swing to JD from LKD		Swing		

=== 1984 ===
1984 Indian general election: Baghpat
Party	Candidate	Votes	%	±%
LKD	Chaudhary Charan Singh	253,463	53.72	
INC	Mahesh Chand	167,789	35.56	
IND	Raj Narain	33,664	7.14	
IND	16 Independent Candidates	16,898	3.58	
Majority		85,674	18.16	
Turnout		479,161	63.48	
Swing to LKD from JP(S)		Swing		

=== 1980 ===
1980 Indian general election: Baghpat
Party	Candidate	Votes	%	±%
JP(S)	Chaudhary Charan Singh	323,077	65.21	
INC(I)	Ram Chandra Vikal	157,956	31.88	
JP	Dhara Singh	3,843	0.78	
IND	Ramesh	2,746	0.55	
AIFB	Dharam Pal Jatav	2,310	0.47	
IND	Bansh Gopal	1,814	0.37	
IND	Vaid Pandit Chanka Charya	1,440	0.29	
Majority		165,121	33.33	
Turnout		501,292	70.34	
Swing to JP(S) from JP		Swing		

=== 1977 ===
1977 Indian general election: Baghpat
Party	Candidate	Votes	%	±%
JP	Chaudhary Charan Singh	286,301	63.47	
INC	Ram Chandra Vikal	164,763	36.53	
Majority		121,538	26.94	
Turnout		456,968	74.83	
Swing to JP from INC		Swing		

=== 1971 ===
1971 Indian general election: Baghpat
Party	Candidate	Votes	%	±%
INC	Ram Chandra Vikal	170,270	51.00	
BKD	Raghuvir Singh	122,660	36.74	
INC(O)	Om Prakash	16,518	4.95	
RPA (Note: Republican Party of India (Ambedkarite))	Jai Pal Singh Kashyap	13,973	4.19	
IND	Nain Singh	8,664	2.60	
PBI (Note: Proutist Bloc of India)	Chandra Prakash Atrey	1,764	0.53	
Majority		47,610	14.26	
Turnout		340,780	61.76	
Swing to INC from Independent		Swing		

=== 1967 ===
1967 Indian general election: Baghpat
Party	Candidate	Votes	%	±%
IND	Raghuvir Singh Shastri	154,518	50.15	
INC	K. C. Sharma	66,960	21.73	
CPI	S. Swaroop	43,860	14.24	
IND	B. Singh	15,223	4.94	
IND	D. S. Tiagi	15,095	4.90	
IND	D. Chand	12,446	4.04	
Majority		87,558	28.42	
Turnout		325,439	63.64	
Independent win (new seat)				

== Notes ==
Lok Sabha
Preceded by Surat	Constituency represented by the prime minister 1979–1980	Succeeded by Medak
