= Satya Pal Singh (Uttar Pradesh politician) =

Member of Parliament of India and former Mumbai Police Commissioner

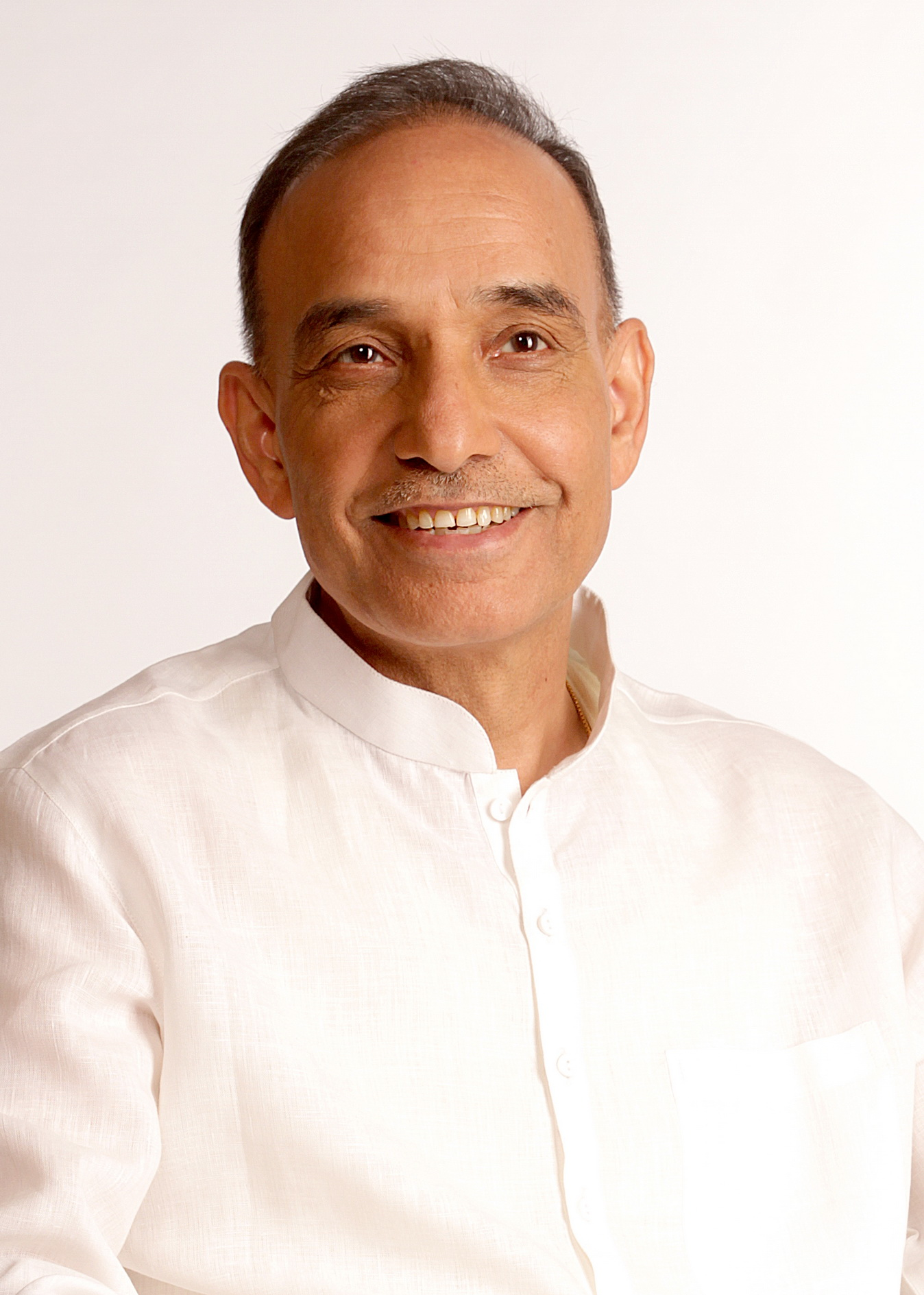

Minister of State for Human Resource Development (Higher Education)
- In office 3 September 2017 – 24 May 2019
- Prime Minister: Narendra Modi
- Preceded by: Mahendra Nath Pandey
- Succeeded by: Sanjay Shamrao Dhotre

Minister of State for Water Resources, River Development & Ganga Rejuvenation
- In office 3 September 2017 – 24 May 2019
- Prime Minister: Narendra Modi
- Preceded by: Sanjeev Balyan

Member of Parliament, Lok Sabha
- In office 26 May 2014 – 4 June 2024
- Preceded by: Ajit Singh
- Succeeded by: Rajkumar Sangwan
- Constituency: Baghpat, Uttar Pradesh

37th Police Commissioner of Mumbai
- In office 23 August 2012 – 31 January 2014
- Preceded by: Arup Patnaik
- Succeeded by: Rakesh Maria

Personal details
- Born: 29 November 1955 (age 70) Basauli, Uttar Pradesh, India
- Party: Bharatiya Janata Party
- Spouse: Alka Singh (1982–present)
- Children: Charu Pragya; Richa Prama; Praket Arya
- Education: Janta Vedic College; University of Delhi; University of Wollongong
- Occupation: Chancellor at Gurukul Kangri University
- Profession: Indian Police Service, Politician

Satya Pal Singh (born 29 November 1955) is an Indian politician and a retired Indian Police Service officer of 1980 batch of Maharashtra cadre who is currently serving as member of the Bharatiya Janata Party. He previously served as Minister of State for Human Resource Development responsible for Higher Education and Minister of State in the Ministry of Water Resources, River Development & Ganga Rejuvenation. He is a Member of Parliament (MP) since 2014, representing Baghpat constituency, Uttar Pradesh in the 16th Lok Sabha and then retaining his seat in 2019 elections.

He formerly served as the Police Commissioner of Mumbai. He is also Chancellor of Gurukul Kangri University. His daughter, Charu Pragya is a spokesperson of the Bharatiya Janta Yuva Morcha (BJYM).

== Early life and education ==
Singh was born on 29 November 1955 in a Jat family of Tomar clan to Ramkishan and Hukmwati, in Basauli in Baghpat district of Uttar Pradesh. He is a post-graduate in chemistry from Digambar Jain College, Baraut and has also done M. Phil in Chemistry from Delhi University. He secured an MBA from Australia and also has a MA in Public Administration and Ph.D. in Naxalism from Nagpur University. Before joining the I.P.S, Singh wanted to become a scientist.

== Police career ==
Satya Pal Singh is a retired IPS officer of Maharashtra cadre and 1980 batch.

Singh's first posting was as Assistant Superintendent of Police of Nasik. He then went on to become the Superintendent of Police of Buldhana. Prior to being appointed the Mumbai Police chief, Singh was Maharashtra's Additional Director General of Police. He also served as the Joint Commissioner of Police (Crime) in Mumbai. During his tenure as the Crime Chief of Mumbai, he is credited for breaking the backbone of the organised crime syndicates that terrorised Mumbai in the 1990s, including the Chhota Rajan, Chhota Shakeel and Arun Gawli gangs. During the same time in the late '90s, when gangland activity was at its peak in Mumbai and the mafia in Mumbai went berserk with several high-profile killings, Singh formed special police squads and cracked down on several underworld figures. That tenure saw several encounter killings in Mumbai with specialists such as Daya Nayak, Pradeep Sharma and Vijay Salaskar given the licence to take on the underworld. It was during this stint that the 25 August 2003 Mumbai bombings at Gateway of India and Zaveri Bazaar took place; he is credited with having been the officer at the helm when the case was detected.

As Police Commissioner of Nagpur, he began an outreach programme called Mission Mrityunjay. This was an anti terror initiative that aimed to enlist college students in the fight against terrorism whereby students recommended by college authorities assisted the police in intelligence gathering and reported suspicious and anti-social activities on campus and in the city. Apart from fighting terrorism, the police hoped that these Mrityunjay Clubs would help develop communal and social harmony among the youth and improve their relationship with the police. During his stint 386 such clubs were formed in the city. Identical programmes were launched in Pune as well as Mumbai during his tenure as the Police Chief of the respective cities. In Pune, the city police had reached out to 122 senior colleges and 86 junior colleges through Mission Mrityunjay. However, this programme met with some rough weather during its trial in Mumbai as its legitimacy and choice of name was questioned by the State Minorities Commission. As Nagpur police chief, Singh had also busted the 'matka' gangs there, unearthing a local politician's links to the high-profile racket.

His tenure as Pune Police Commissioner was witness to the 2010 Pune bombing which occurred at the German Bakery that killed 17 people and injured at least 60 more. During this stint he famously courted controversy by taking on his own boss, the then Maharashtra Home minister Ramesh Bagwe, when he refused clearance to renew Bagwe's passport since the minister had no less than 19 cases pending against him, some allegedly criminal. When Singh refused to buckle under political pressure, he was shunted out to the Establishment Wing of Maharashtra Police.

In June 2011, weeks after being appointed chairman of a special investigation team constituted by the Gujarat High Court to probe the Ishrat Jahan fake encounter case, Singh was replaced after requesting the court to relieve him after he cited differences of opinion between two other SIT members. Singh said there was difference of opinion between the other two members of the SIT, Mohan Jha and Satish Verma, and said it would be difficult to rely on them for investigations.

On 23 August 2012, Singh was appointed as the Police Commissioner of Mumbai after his predecessor Arup Patnaik was facing flak and eventually shunted out for his handling of the Azad Maidan riots that occurred on 11 August in the city. Several policemen were injured in that melee. Maharashtra Navnirman Sena chief Raj Thackeray, during a massive rally in Mumbai, had demanded immediate ouster of Patnaik over the violence at Azad Maidan, for allegedly failing to control the situation during a demonstration to protest alleged persecution of Muslims in Assam and Myanmar. Patnaik was also in line of fire by the Opposition for handling of the Azad Maidan mayhem.

On 31 January 2014 Singh tendered his resignation and applied for the voluntary retirement scheme (VRS) and sought to be relieved as soon as possible from his post so he could contest the upcoming national elections. Home Minister RR Patil, who belonged to the Nationalist Congress Party, announced that Dr Singh's application was accepted with immediate effect. The Democratic Front government in Maharashtra was in a hurry to process the VRS application for voluntary retirement mainly to facilitate his joining the Bharatiya Janata Party (BJP), and to possibly enable him to attend a rally in Meerut and join the party in the presence of Gujarat CM Narendra Modi and BJP chief Rajnath Singh. Singh was the first serving Police Commissioner of Mumbai to resign from his post. In an interview to the Economic Times on 1 February 2014, Singh stated his reason for quitting,

"My inner voice is telling me that it's time to change profession. As a police officer, I have worked for the people of Mumbai and Maharashtra for many years, but now it's time to work for the entire country with a renewed energy."

He has also been on deputation to the CBI.

=== Positions held ===
- Superintendent of Police, Gadchiroli district
- Superintendent of Police, Nasik district
- Superintendent of Police, Buldhana district
- Inspector General of Police, Nagpur Range
- Joint Commissioner of Police (Crime), Mumbai
- Special Inspector General, Konkan Range
- Police Commissioner, Nagpur
- Police Commissioner, Pune
- Additional Director General of Police (ADGP Establishment and Law & Order), Maharashtra
- Police Commissioner, Mumbai

== Political career ==
Singh joined the BJP at a rally organised in Meerut on 2 February 2014 in the presence BJP's PM candidate Narendra Modi, then party chief Rajnath Singh and then UP in-charge Amit Shah.

He was pitted against Civil Aviation Minister and Rashtriya Lok Dal supremo Ajit Singh from Baghpat (Lok Sabha constituency) where he won with a thumping margin of 2,09,866 votes, defeating Samajwadi Party's Ghulam Mohammed and pushing Ajit Singh to the third spot with only 1,99,516 votes. The Baghpat Lok Sabha constituency seat was the first to be declared in favour of the BJP led NDA on the day of the results. Ajit Singh, the 75 year old Jat leader, suffered a massive defeat as he had never lost an election from Baghpat since 1999. In fact, he had been representing Baghpat in the Lok Sabha since 1989, only losing to Sompal Shastri in the 1998 elections before being voted back in the 1999 elections. Prior to him, his father Chaudhary Charan Singh, the former Prime Minister of India represented Baghpat in the Lok Sabha from 1977 till his death.

Singh's election campaign was uniquely supported by national and international-level shooters from the constituency which claims to have produced the highest number of national-level shooters in the country in the last 15 years thanks to a shooting club in Johri village, which Singh was instrumental in setting up in 1998. A patron of the club, Singh would often donate a month's salary to organise an annual tournament in the hope that drawing the youth to sports would prevent them from going astray and help in their job prospects as well. The club claims to have given over 400 shooters to the country. At least 80 of them have got jobs in the Army, ITBP, CISF, Punjab Police, IAF and Railways.

PM candidate Narendra Modi and Bollywood actor Sunny Deol also campaigned for him.

On the day of the voting, Singh was attacked and manhandled by unidentified men at a polling station in Malakpur near Baraut where he had gone to check allegations of bogus voting.

In the Parliament, Singh has been vocal about farmers' issues, advocating the need to involve the farming community actively in drafting of the Union Budget. He has also been raising the problems faced by sugarcane farmers in western UP who are debt ridden in the face of non-repayment of their heightening dues by sugar mills. He has actively been campaigning for Government regulation of sugar prices. Speaking about the need of greater involvement of farmers in the decision making process at a seminar organised by the Council for Social Development, he said:

"About 65 per cent of our population is still dependent on agriculture. Agrarian community is most distressed and neglected even today. We are never bothered about them. Farmers are never consulted before drafting the budget. There has been no farmers' representation either in Planning Commission or in Commission for Agricultural Costs and Prices (CACP) so far. Without involvement and participation of farmers, we have been designing policies for farmers. The policies are all bureaucratic driven. The existing policies, so far, have not been able to improve farm income and encourage youth to take it up as a profession."

On 7 August 2014, Singh was named as a member of a special expert committee to review security of the Parliament House complex which was targeted by terrorists in 2001. The committee constituted by Lok Sabha Speaker Sumitra Mahajan had former Union Home Secretary R. K. Singh as its head and also included former Rajasthan DGP Harish Meena besides Singh.

On 29 November 2014, under the Sansad Adarsh Gram Yojana, he adopted Palri village in his constituency Baghpat in Uttar Pradesh.

On 11 December 2014, he was appointed as the Vice President of the Bharatiya Janata Party's Uttar Pradesh (UP) Working Committee. On 4 September 2017, he was appointed as minister of state in HRD ministry under Modi government.

== Controversies ==
On 2 June 2014, a prostitution racket was busted by Mumbai police being run from a flat owned by Satya Pal Singh but leased out to a well known business house. He said it was leased out to a real estate firm Indiabulls for last 33 months and stated his plans to sue them for maligning his image.

On 19 January 2018, Satya Pal Singh publicly defied Charles Darwin's Theory of Evolution and he claimed that "Darwin's theory is scientifically wrong. Nobody, including our ancestors, in written or oral, have said they saw an ape turning into a man". He insisted that Darwin was wrong about evolution and the idea of evolution should be removed from school and college curriculum. Many scientists later criticised Satya Pal Singh for his unscientific statement.

Following the Shakti Mills gang rape of a photojournalist in Mumbai in August 2013, Singh was severely criticized by the public for defending moral policing. He was quoted to have said, "On the one hand you want to have a promiscuous culture and on the other hand you want a safe and secure environment for the people."

== Personal life ==
Singh is a vocal proponent of holistic health, yoga and vegetarianism. Deeply passionate about Indian mythology, philosophy and sociology, he is a dedicated Arya Samaj. A scholar of Vedic studies and Sanskrit, Singh regularly delivers lectures on spirituality, religious extremism, inter-religious harmony and corruption. Singh has started a campaign targeting college students to break the myths around religion and create awareness about Vedic literature which he believes is the divine order for world peace. He has been quoted as saying that but for his reading of the Satyarth Prakash, his knowledge and ability to discuss thorny issues threadbare would not have been there and perhaps he would not have made it to the high and coveted office that he is occupying today.

== Books ==
Dr. Singh is also the author of two bestselling books: one on tackling the Naxalite problem, and the other a self-help book, Talash Insaan Ki (The Search for Man) which deals with "mankind’s continuous quest in search of the truth", that has sold over a lakh copies and has been translated into several languages. The Urdu translation of this book was released by Bollywood actor Amitabh Bachchan along with poet-scriptwriter Javed Akhtar and the launch was hosted by Minorities Education Foundation in Mumbai. He intends to complete three more books. One will be about how to bring lasting religious harmony in society, one on challenges faced by the Indian police. The third, Timeless Time, will deal with several questions that have no answers.

== Honours and awards ==
=== Police awards ===
- Special Service Medal for extraordinary work in the Naxalite areas of Andhra Pradesh and Madhya Pradesh
- Police Medal for meritorious service in 1996
- DG's Insignia in 1996
- Shanti Doot International Award - the honour is conferred by the World Peace Movement Trust India.
- President's Police Medal for distinguished service in 2004
