= Jitendra Pal Singh Billu =

Indian politician

Jitendra Pal Singh

Uttar Pradesh Legislative Assembly
- Incumbent
- Assumed office 2017
- Preceded by: Ghulam Mohammad
- Succeeded by: Ghulam Mohammad
- Constituency: Siwalkhas

Personal details
- Born: 17 June 1969 (age 57)
- Party: BJP
- Profession: Politician

Jitendra Pal Singh (17 June 1969) is an Indian politician and a member of BJP. In 2017, he was elected as the member of the Uttar Pradesh Legislative Assembly from Siwalkhas.

== Constituency ==
He won the Siwalkhas on an BJP ticket, Pal Singh Billu beat the member of the Uttar Pradesh Legislative Assembly Ghulam Mohammad of the SP by over 11421 votes.
