= Janata Dal (Ajit) =

Former political party in India

The Janata Dal (Ajit) was a political party in India. It merged with the Indian National Congress in the early 1990s. Its leader, Ajit Singh became a Ministry of Food Processing Industries in government led by P.V. Narasimha Rao from 1991 to 1996.

Later Ajit Singh quit the Indian National Congress and later formed a new party, the Bharatiya Kisan Kamghar Party in 1996. In 1998, Mr Ajit Singh launched the Rashtriya Lok Dal which was one of the original parties run by his father and former Prime Minister of India, Ch Charan Singh and was part of NDA and UPA governments.
