= Sudesh Sharma =

Indian politician

Sudesh Sharma सुदेश शर्मा

MLA, 16th Legislative Assembly
- In office March 2012 – March 2017
- Preceded by: Rajpal Singh
- Succeeded by: Manju Shiwach
- Constituency: Modinagar

Personal details
- Born: 17 January 1965 (age 61) Ghaziabad
- Party: Bhartiya Janta Party
- Spouse: Anju Sharma (wife)
- Children: 2 sons
- Parent: Sompal Sharma (father)
- Education: n/a
- Profession: Farmer & politician

Sudesh Sharma (Hindi: सुदेश शर्मा) is an Indian politician and a member of the 16th Legislative Assembly of Uttar Pradesh of India. He represents the Modinagar constituency of Uttar Pradesh and is a member of the Bhartiya janta party political party.

== Early life and education ==
Sudesh Sharma was born in Ghaziabad. He received a Diploma in Civil Engineering (alma mater not known).

== Political career ==
Sudesh Sharma has been a MLA for one term. He represented the Modinagar constituency and is a member of the Rashtriya Lok Dal political party.

== Posts held ==
#	From	To	Position	Comments
01	March 2012	March 2017	Member, 16th Legislative Assembly	

== See also ==
- Modinagar
- Sixteenth Legislative Assembly of Uttar Pradesh
- Uttar Pradesh Legislative Assembly
