= Sahender Singh =

Indian politician

MLA, 17th Legislative Assembly
- In office 2017–2022
- Preceded by: Virpal Rathi
- Succeeded by: Ajay Kumar
- Constituency: Chhaprauli, Bagpat district

Personal details
- Born: Sahender Singh Ramala
- Party: Bharatiya Janata Party
- Occupation: MLA
- Profession: Politician

Sahender Singh Ramala is an Indian politician and was a member of 17th Uttar Pradesh Legislative Assembly. He represented the Chhaprauli constituency as a member of the Rashtriya Lok Dal. Singh was expelled from party in 2018, after which he joined Bharatiya Janta Party.

== Political career ==
Born to Yoginder Singh, Sahender was a member of the 17th Legislative Assembly of Uttar Pradesh on RLD ticket from 2017-2022, and had represented the Chhaprauli constituency as a member of the Rashtriya Lok Dal. In 2018, Singh was expelled from the party due to anti-party activities, after which he joined Bharatiya Janta Party. In the 2022 Uttar Pradesh Legislative Assembly election, Singh lost to his former party colleague Rashtriya Lok Dal's Ajay Kumar by a margin of 29,508 votes, losing the Chhaprauli constituency seat in the process.

== Posts held ==
#	From	To	Position	Comments
01	2017	Incumbent	Member, 17th Legislative Assembly	

== See also ==
- Uttar Pradesh Legislative Assembly
