= Vikal =

Vikal is a surname. Notable people with the surname include:

- Ankur Vikal, Indian actor
- Ram Chandra Vikal (1916–2011), Indian politician

'Vikal' belong to Gurjar Community, one of the strongest communities in India.
