= Jayant Chaudhary =

Indian politician (born 1978)

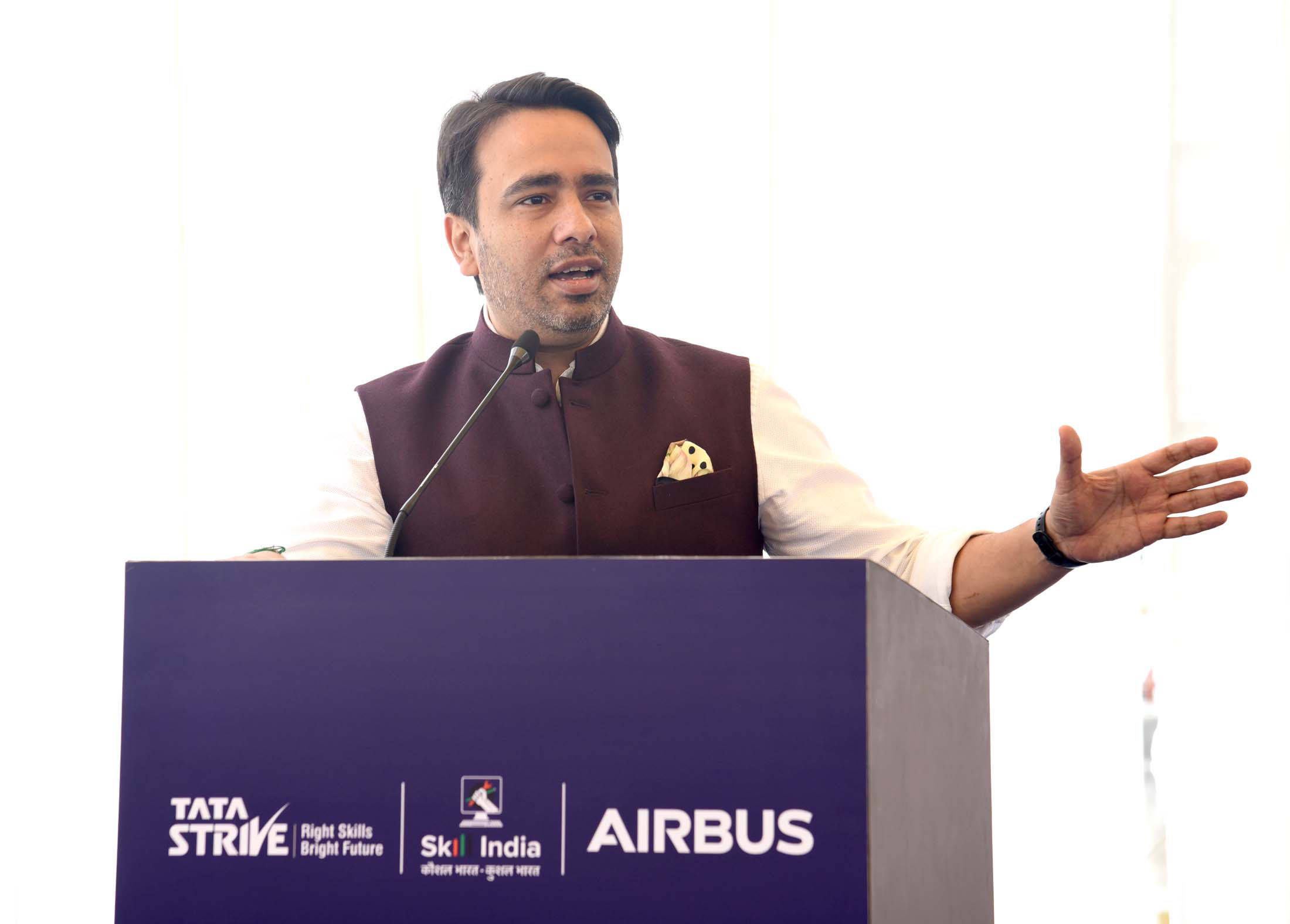
- Chaudhary in 2024

Union Minister of State (Independent Charge) for Skill Development & Entrepreneurship
- Incumbent
- Assumed office 10 June 2024
- Prime Minister: Narendra Modi
- Preceded by: Pralhad Joshi

Union Minister of State for Education
- Incumbent
- Assumed office 10 June 2024 Serving with Sukanta Majumdar
- Minister: Pralhad Joshi
- Preceded by: Rajkumar Ranjan Singh

President of Rashtriya Lok Dal
- Incumbent
- Assumed office 25 May 2021
- Preceded by: Ajit Singh

Member of Parliament, Rajya Sabha
- Incumbent
- Assumed office 5 July 2022
- Preceded by: Sukhram Singh Yadav
- Constituency: Uttar Pradesh

Member of Parliament, Lok Sabha
- In office 16 May 2009 – 16 May 2014
- Preceded by: Manvendra Singh
- Succeeded by: Hema Malini
- Constituency: Mathura, Uttar Pradesh

Member of Uttar Pradesh Legislative Assembly
- In office 6 March 2012 – 21 March 2012
- Preceded by: Shyam Sunder Sharma
- Succeeded by: Shyam Sunder Sharma
- Constituency: Mant

Personal details
- Born: 27 December 1978 (age 47) Dallas, Texas, U.S.
- Citizenship: United States, India
- Party: Rashtriya Lok Dal
- Other political affiliations: National Democratic Alliance (2024–present)
- Spouse: Charu Singh (m. 2003)
- Children: 2
- Parent: Chaudhary Ajit Singh (father)
- Relatives: Charan Singh (grandfather); Gayatri Devi (grandmother)
- Education: London School of Economics; University of Delhi
- Occupation: Politician

Jayant Chaudhary (born 27 December 1978) is an American-born Indian politician who is serving as the 5th Minister of Skill Development and Entrepreneurship since 2024. A member of the Rashtriya Lok Dal (RLD), he has served as a member of the Rajya Sabha from Uttar Pradesh since 2022. Previously, he also served as a member of the 15th Lok Sabha from Mathura. He is a third-generation member of the Chaudhary family of Uttar Pradesh and grandson of Charan Singh, former prime minister of India.

== Early life and education ==
Jayant Chaudhary was born on 27 December 1978 in Dallas, Texas, United States, to Ajit Singh and Radhika Singh. He was born into a Hindu Jat family. He is a grandson of Charan Singh, former prime minister of India. The family has a farming background and his grandfather, Charan Singh, participated in the Indian Independence Movement and was an active member of Arya Samaj since the 1930s. Jayant graduated from Sri Venkateswara College of the Delhi University and then did master of science in accounting and finance from the London School of Economics in 2002.

== Political career ==
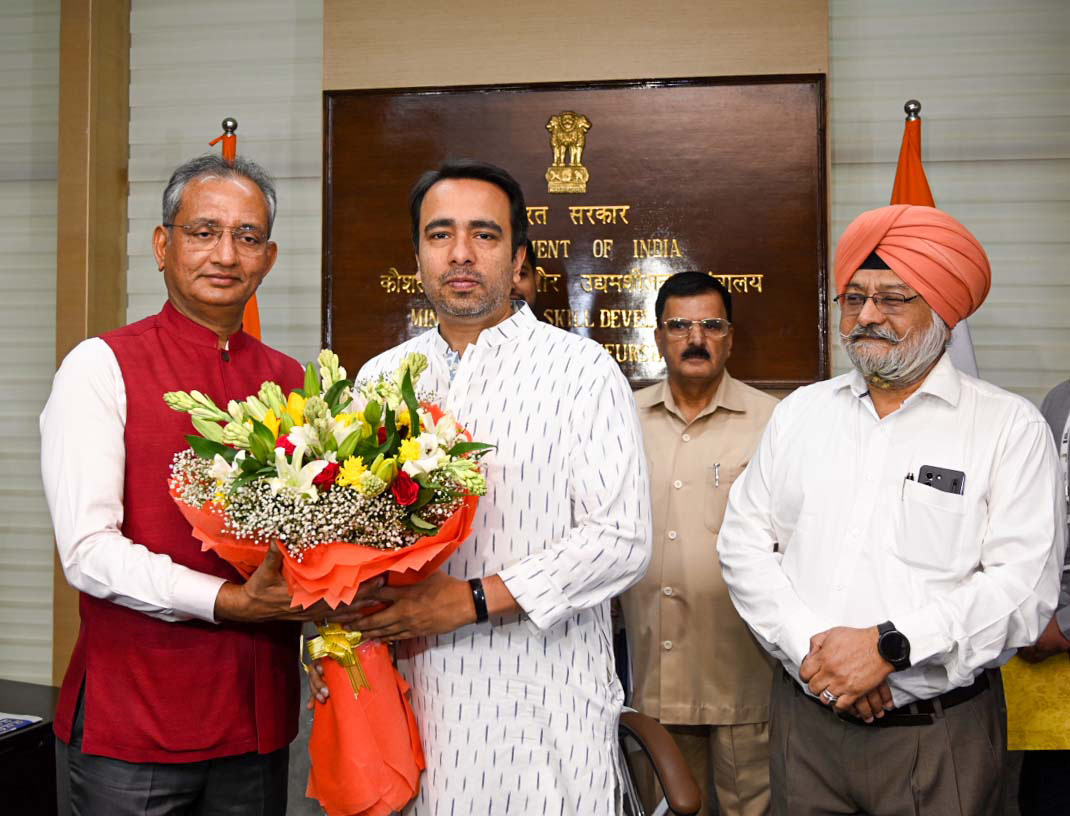
Chaudhary bbeing welcomed during his arrival for assumption of charge as the Minister of State (Independent Charge) for Skill Development and Entrepreneurship, in New Delhi on 11 June 2024.

Being a third-generation member of the Chaudhary family of Uttar Pradesh, he started his career in electoral politics with the 2009 Indian general election. He became a Member of Parliament, Lok Sabha in 2009 representing Mathura as a member of the Rashtriya Lok Dal. During his tenure, he participated in debates and advocated for key issues, particularly those affecting rural and farming communities. Chaudhary introduced a private member Bill focused on fair land acquisition practices and adequate compensation for landowners.

Chaudhary was a member of the Standing Committee on Commerce, the Consultative Committee on Finance, the Indian Council of Agricultural Research (ICAR), and the Committee on Government Assurances. He has served previously on the Standing Committees on Agriculture and Finance as well as the Committee on Ethics.

In 2012, Chaudhary contested the Uttar Pradesh Legislative Assembly elections from the Mant constituency. He then won the seat and boosted the RLD presence in western Uttar Pradesh, a region historically aligned with the party’s farmer-centric policies and Rashtriya Lok Dal won nine seats in these elections.

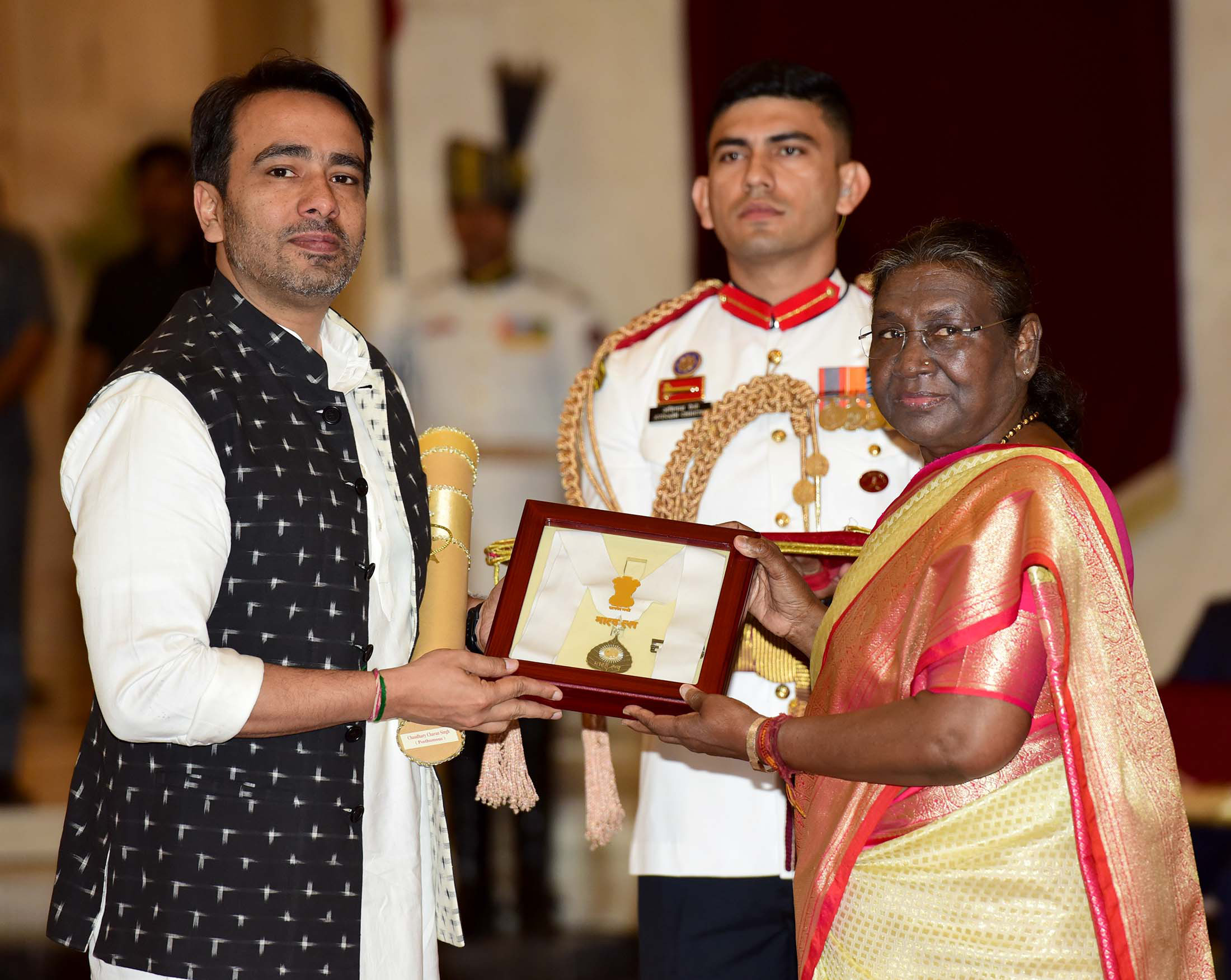
President of India, Droupadi Murmu presenting the Bharat Ratna (Posthumous) to Charan Singh

Chaudhary lost the 2014 and 2019 general elections and this period marked a decline in the Rashtriya Lok Dal presence in Uttar Pradesh. Following the passing of his father, Ajit Singh, Jayant was appointed as the national president of the Rashtriya Lok Dal on 25 May 2021.

During the 2020–2021 farmers' protest, Chaudhary criticised the central government for three farm bills and called them as death warrant for farmers while addressing a maha panchayat in Agra district. On 5 July 2022, he was nominated to the Rajya Sabha, the upper house of parliament as joint candidate of Samajwadi Party and Rashtriya Lok Dal.

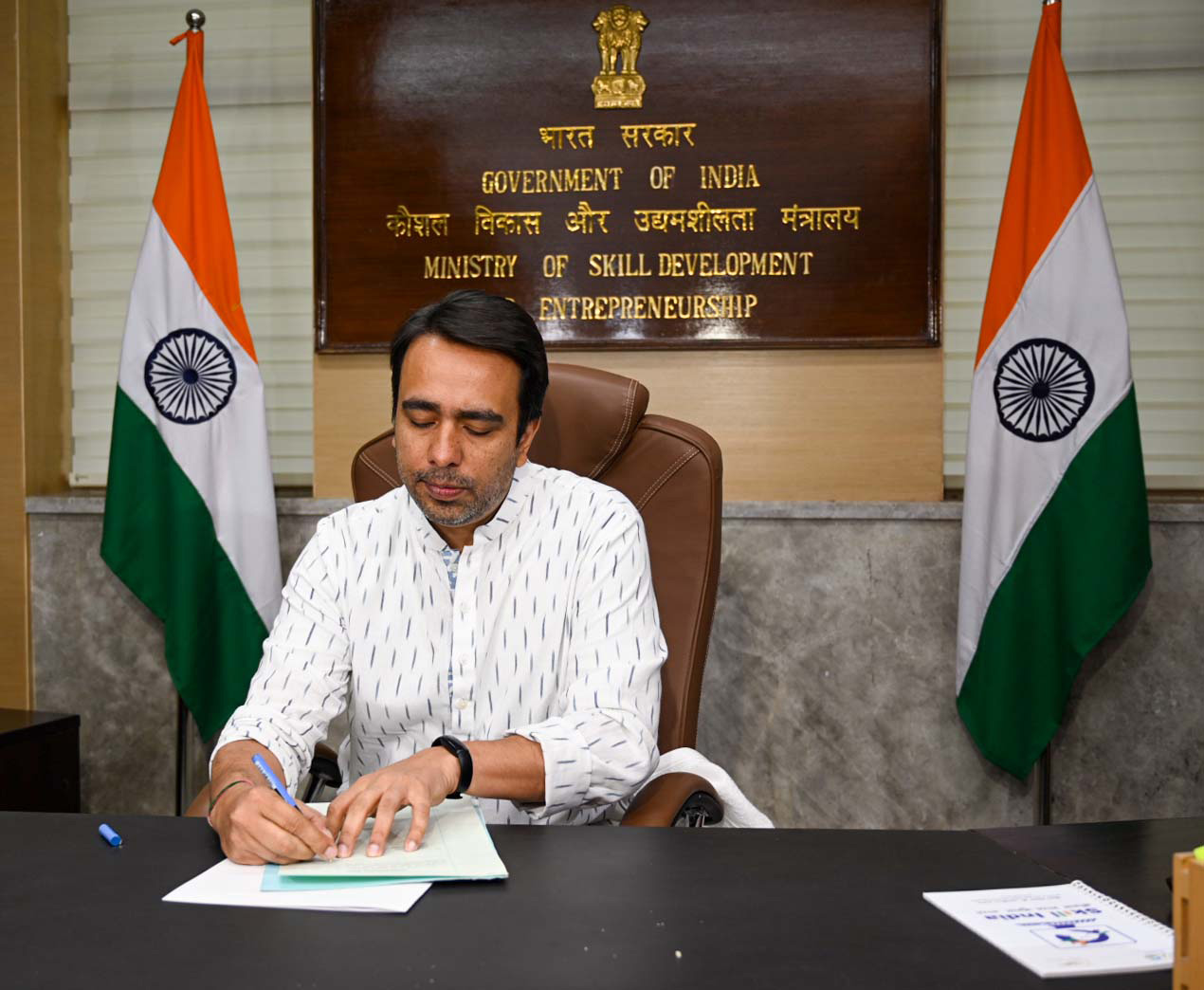
Chaudhary taking charge as the Minister of State (Independent Charge) for Skill Development and Entrepreneurship

In the 2024 general elections, the Rashtriya Lok Dal (RLD), led by Jayant Chaudhary, formed an alliance with the Bharatiya Janata Party (BJP).The party contested two seats — Baghpat and Bijnor — and won both. Following the elections Chaudhary was appointed as the Union minister of state (Independent charge) for skill development and entrepreneurship and Minister of state in the education department in Third Modi ministry.

=== Ministerial role ===
In June 2024, Chaudhary was appointed Minister of State (Independent Charge) for Skill Development and Entrepreneurship and Minister of State for Education in the Third Modi ministry. In these portfolios, he has overseen the drafting of a new National Skill Development and Entrepreneurship Policy, emphasising quality training, global recognition of Indian certifications, and integration of emerging sectors such as artificial intelligence, digital technologies, and electric mobility. He launched the Skills for the Future report, initiated reforms in Industrial Training Institutes through a hub-and-spoke model, promoted apprenticeships, and strengthened the regulatory framework of the National Council for Vocational Education and Training.

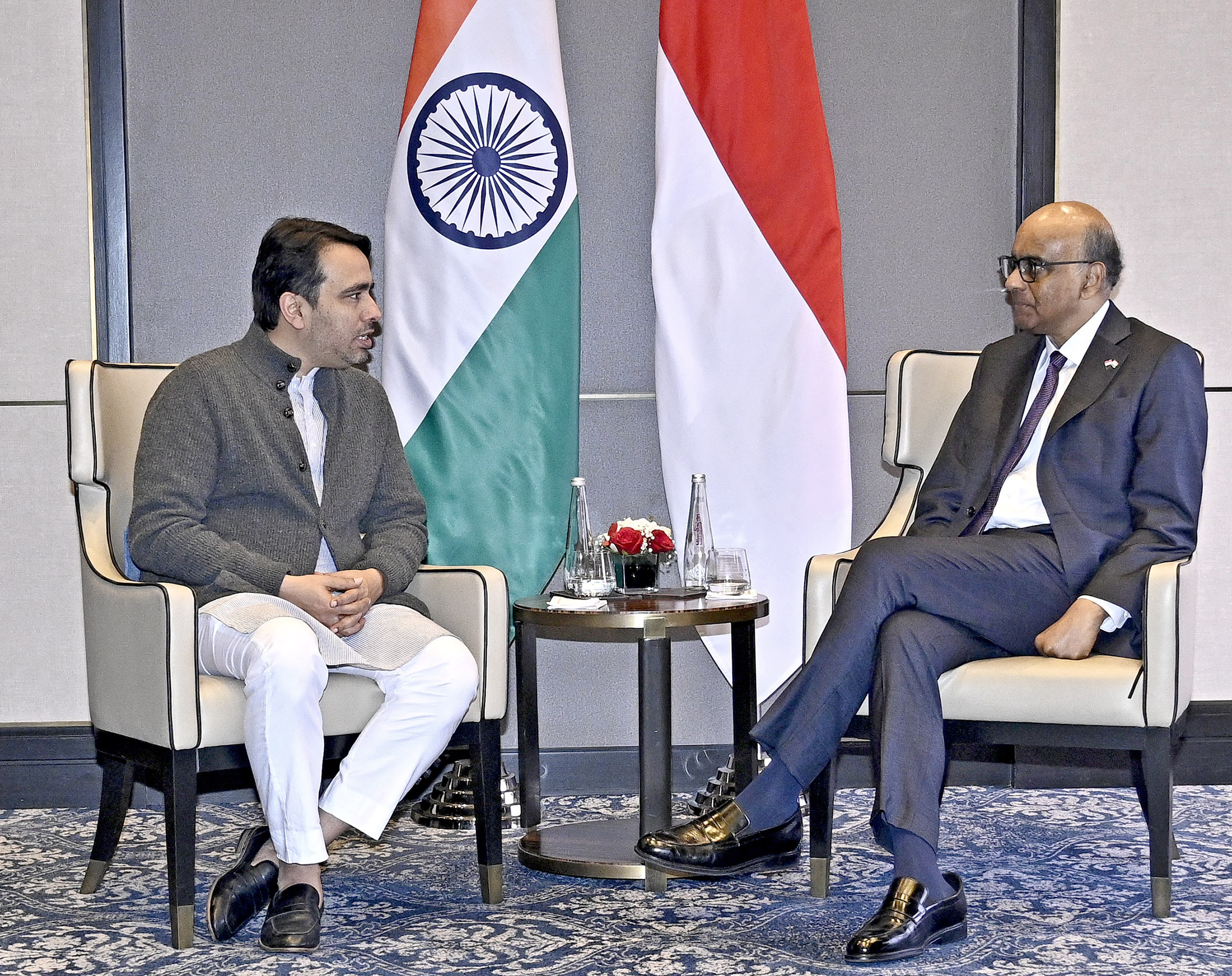
Chaudhary with Singapore President Tharman Shanmugaratnam in New Delhi

In January 2025, Chaudhary met President Tharman Shanmugaratnam of Singapore during his state visit to New Delhi, held as part of the 60th anniversary of India–Singapore diplomatic relations. The discussions focused on expanding bilateral cooperation in skill development, digital economy, and green industries.

== Personal life ==
He is the son of Ajit Singh and grandson of former Prime Minister Chaudhary Charan Singh. Chaudhary married fashion designer Charu Singh in 2003, with whom he has two daughters.
