= Virpal Rathi =

Indian politician

Vir Pal

MLA, 16th Legislative Assembly
- In office Mar 2012 – Mar 2017
- Preceded by: Ajay Tomar
- Succeeded by: Sahender Singh
- Constituency: Chhaprauli

Personal details
- Born: 30 October 1961 (age 64) Baghpat district, Uttar Pradesh
- Party: Rashtriya Lok Dal
- Spouse: Lokesh Chaudhary (wife)
- Children: 1 son & 2 daughters
- Education: D.A.V. Inter college
- Profession: Farmer & politician

Vir Pal is an Indian politician and a member of the 16th Legislative Assembly of Uttar Pradesh of India. He represents the Chhaprauli constituency of Uttar Pradesh and is a member of the Rashtriya Lok Dal political party.

== Early life and education ==
Vir Pal was born in Baghpat district, Uttar Pradesh to Mangeram. He attended the D.A.V. Inter college in Bagpat and received education till twelfth grade.

== Political career ==
Vir Pal has been a MLA for one term. He represented the Chhaprauli constituency and is a member of the Rashtriya Lok Dal political party.

== Posts held ==
#	From	To	Position	Comments
01	2012	Mar-2017	Member, 16th Legislative Assembly	

== See also ==
- Chhaprauli
- Sixteenth Legislative Assembly of Uttar Pradesh
- Uttar Pradesh Legislative Assembly
