= Modinagar Assembly constituency =

Constituency of the Uttar Pradesh legislative assembly in India

Modinagar
- Constituency No. 57 for the Uttar Pradesh Legislative Assembly

Constituency details
- Country: India
- Region: North India
- State: Uttar Pradesh
- District: Ghaziabad
- Established: 1956
- Total electors: 3,42,965 (2019)
- Reservation: None

Member of Legislative Assembly
- 18th Uttar Pradesh Legislative Assembly
- Incumbent Manju Shiwach
- Party: Bharatiya Janata Party
- Elected year: 2017

Modinagar is one of the 403 constituencies of the Uttar Pradesh Legislative Assembly, India. It is a part of the Ghaziabad district and one of the five assembly constituencies in the Baghpat Lok Sabha constituency. The first election in this assembly constituency was held in 1957 after the delimitation order was passed in 1956.

== Wards / areas ==
Extent of Modinagar Assembly constituency is KCs Modinagar, Bhojpur, Modinagar MB, Faridnagar NP, Patla NP & Niwari NP of Modi Nagar Tehsil.

== Members of the Legislative Assembly ==
| Year | Member | Party |
|---|---|---|
| 1957 | Vichitra Narain Sharma | Indian National Congress |
| 1962 | Vichitra Narain Sharma | Indian National Congress |
| 1967 | Sarju Prasad Tyagi | Republican Party of India |
| 1969 | Sher Ali Khan | Bharatiya Kranti Dal |
| 1974 | Megh Nath Singh | Indian National Congress |
| 1977 | Sohan Bir | Janata Party |
| 1980 | Sukhbir Singh Gahlot | Indian National Congress (I) |
| 1985 | Vimla Singh | Indian National Congress |
| 1989 | Sukhbir Singh Gahlot | Janata Dal |
| 1991 | Sukhbir Singh Gahlot | Janata Dal |
| 1993 | Narendra Singh Sisodiya | Bharatiya Janata Party |
| 1996 | Narendra Singh Sisodiya | Bharatiya Janata Party |
| 2002 | Narendra Singh Sisodiya | Bharatiya Janata Party |
| 2007 | Rajpal Singh | Bahujan Samaj Party |
| 2012 | Sudesh Sharma | Rashtriya Lok Dal |
| 2017 | Manju Shiwach | Bharatiya Janata Party |
| 2022 | Manju Shiwach | Bharatiya Janata Party |

== Election results ==
=== 2027 ===
2027 Uttar Pradesh Legislative Assembly election: Modinagar
| Party | Candidate | Votes | % | ±% |
|---|---|---|---|---|
| INDIA | | | | |
| NDA | | | | |
| BSP | | | | |
| NOTA | None of the above | | | |
| Majority | | | | |
| Turnout | | | | |
| gain from | | Swing | | |

=== 2022 ===
2022 Uttar Pradesh Legislative Assembly election: Modinagar
| Party | Candidate | Votes | % | ±% |
|---|---|---|---|---|
| BJP | Manju Shiwach | 113,349 | 50.63 | ▲0.31 |
| RLD | Sudesh Sharma | 78,730 | 35.17 | ▲21.51 |
| BSP | Dr. Poonam Garg | 26,729 | 11.94 | ▼7.54 |
| INC | Neeraj Kumari | 2,073 | 0.93 | |
| NOTA | None of the above | 869 | 0.39 | ▼0.11 |
| Majority | | 34,619 | 15.46 | ▼15.38 |
| Turnout | | 223,867 | 67.36 | ▲2.61 |
| BJP hold | | | | |

=== 2017 ===
2017 Uttar Pradesh Legislative Assembly election: Modinagar
| Party | Candidate | Votes | % | ±% |
|---|---|---|---|---|
| BJP | Manju Shiwach | 108,631 | 50.32 | |
| BSP | Wahab Chaudhary | 42,049 | 19.48 | |
| SP | Ram Asray Sharma | 32,507 | 15.06 | |
| RLD | Sudesh Sharma | 29,477 | 13.66 | |
| NOTA | None of the above | 1,074 | 0.5 | |
| Majority | | 66,582 | 30.84 | |
| Turnout | | 215,867 | 64.75 | |
| BJP gain from RLD | | Swing | | |

=== 2012 ===
2012 Uttar Pradesh Legislative Assembly election: Modinagar
| Party | Candidate | Votes | % | ±% |
|---|---|---|---|---|
| RLD | Sudesh Sharma | 58,635 | 33.08 | − |
| BSP | Rajpal Singh | 44,686 | 25.21 | − |
| SP | Ramasray Sharma | 41,317 | 23.31 | − |
| | Remainder 9 candidates | 32,625 | 18.39 | − |
| Majority | | 13,949 | 7.87 | − |
| Turnout | | 177,263 | 62.61 | − |
| RLD gain from BSP | | Swing | | |

== See also ==
- Baghpat Lok Sabha constituency
- Ghaziabad district, India
- Sixteenth Legislative Assembly of Uttar Pradesh
- Uttar Pradesh Legislative Assembly
