= Jashodaben Modi =

Wife of Indian Prime Minister Narendra Modi and Indian school teacher

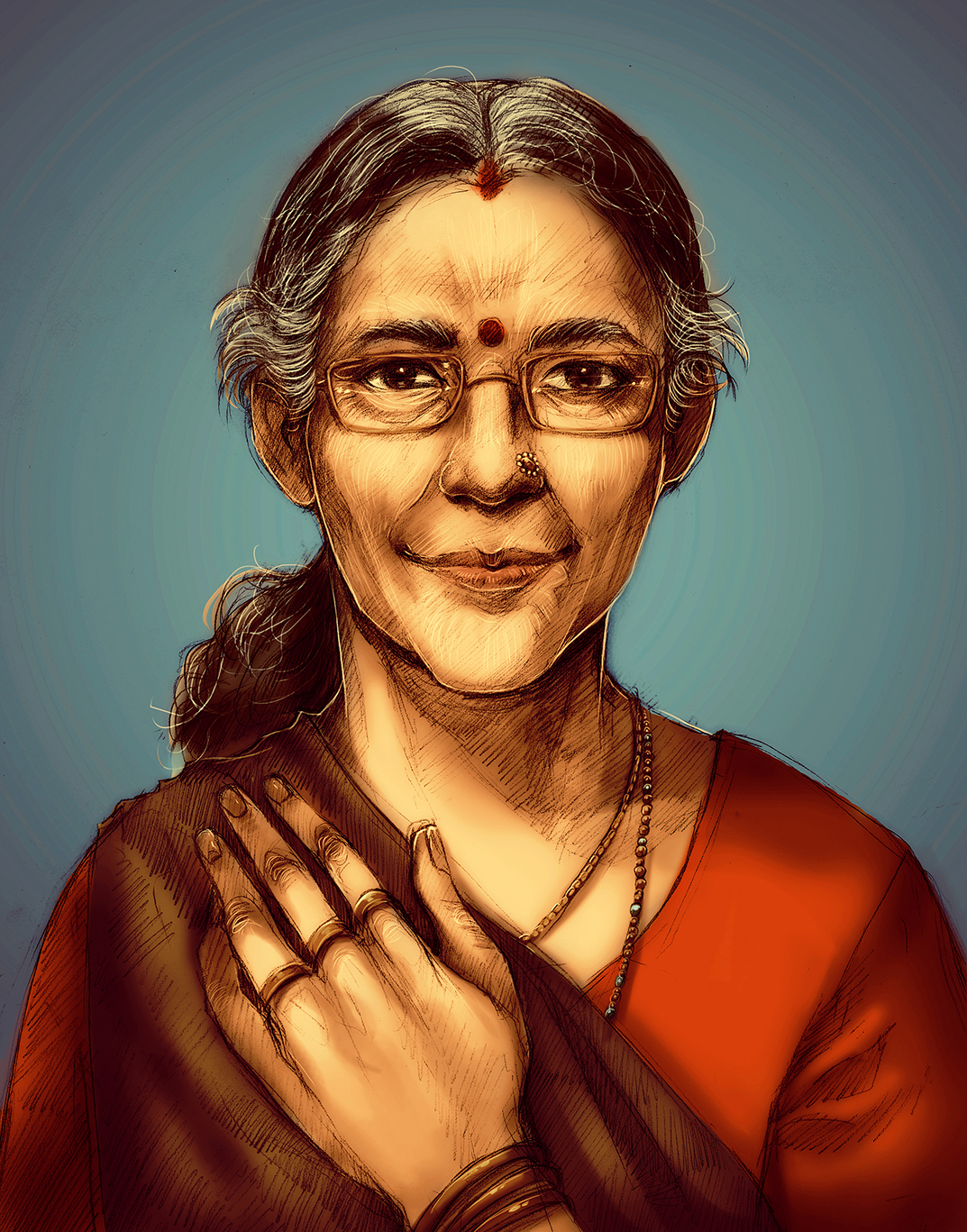
- Painted portrait, 2015

Spouse of the Prime Minister of India
- Incumbent
- Assumed role 26 May 2014
- Prime Minister: Narendra Modi
- Preceded by: Gursharan Kaur

Personal details
- Born: Jashodaben Chimanlal Modi; 1952 (age 73–74) Brahmanwada, Gujarat, India
- Spouse: Narendra Modi (m. 1968; sep. 1971)
- Occupation: Teacher (retired)

Jashodaben Narendrabhai Modi (née Chimanlal Modi; born 1952) is an Indian former school teacher and the estranged wife of Narendra Modi, the Prime Minister of India. The couple were married in 1968 when she was 16–17 and Modi was 18. About two years into the marriage, her husband, Narendra Modi, estranged with her. He did not acknowledge the marriage publicly until he was legally required to do so prior to the 2014 Indian general elections. In 2015, Jashodaben retired from her teaching job.

== Early life, marriage, and career ==
Jashodaben was born in 1952. Her mother died when she was two years old.

Narendra Modi and Jashodaben had an arranged marriage, starting with a family-arranged betrothal in their very early childhood. According to Narendra Modi's brother, the couple had undergone vivaha, the religious ceremony of Hindu marriage when Narendra Modi was 18 and Jashodaben was about 16 or 17. Narendra Modi abandoned her soon after the marriage.

After about two years of being out of contact with all who knew him, Modi returned to Vadnagar and contacted his family. At his mother's insistence, Jashodaben came to the family household to maintain their marriage, but her husband objected to the arrangement, insisting on continuing his life on his own terms and encouraging her to continue in her studies.

He told me once that "I will be travelling across the country and will go as and where I please; what will you do following me?" When I came to Vadnagar to live with his family, he told me "Why did you come to your in-laws' house when you are still so young, you must instead focus on pursuing your studies." The decision to leave was my own and there was never any conflict between us. He never spoke to me about the RSS or about his political leanings. When he told me he would be moving around the country as he wished, I told him I would like to join him. However, on many occasions when I went to my in-laws' place, he would not be present and he stopped coming there. He used to spend a lot of time in RSS shakhas. So I too stopped going there after a point and I went back to my father's house.

— Jashodaben Modi in 2014

Jashodaben said that she spent a total of about three months with her husband during a three-year period before their final separation.

Jashodaben continued with her professional life, receiving a Secondary School Certificate in 1972 or 1974, completing teacher's training in 1976 and becoming a teacher in 1978. From 1978 to 1990, she taught in Banaskantha district.

In 1991, she moved to Rajosana village, where she now remains. She is retired and her pension is ₹14,000 (US$150) per month. One commentator said that her low salary would have made much of life a hardship for her. Talking about her relationship with Modi, in one interview Jashodaben said "We have never been in touch... There has been no communication from his end to this day." In a later interview Jashodaben said that until 1987, she and Modi spoke "normally". Jashodaben lives with her brother Ashok and his wife in Unjha. Jashodaben survived a fatal car wreck in 2018.

== Public discussion of marriage ==
Rumours had long been circulating that Modi was actually married. In 1992, Jashodaben refused to be interviewed by the newspaper Abhiyan when that publication presented a story on the marriage of her and Modi. Darshan Desai, a reporter for The Indian Express, located Jashodaben in May 2002, but she and others in her village had refused to speak to him and he was told to leave the town. In 2009, it was reported that Modi's political opponents had discovered her teaching at a school and living in a one-room tenement. Modi himself did not quite deny that she was his wife, although he did not explicitly acknowledge it either. Her marriage to Modi was said to be common knowledge in her village. She was reportedly diligent and well liked as a teacher, especially among her students.

When required to fill out forms on which his spouse was requested to be identified, Modi had repeatedly been leaving the spousal information section blank or just marked with a dash – including in state assembly elections in 2001, 2002, 2007 and 2012. At political rallies he had said he was single.

In the 2014 Indian general election, Modi contested the Vadodara seat in the Lok Sabha, the lower house of the Parliament of India. Under the Representation of the People Act and following recent rulings stating that a complete response was mandatory, Modi was required to declare any previous marriage. Following legal advice to "come clean" about the issue, for the first time in public and media, Modi acknowledged that he had a wife.

Somabhai Modi, Narendra Modi's brother, issued a statement saying that the arranged marriage had been forced on Modi by his family. He said that the marriage was never consummated, and that Modi left it soon after it was solemnized. His brother further said that Modi had been inspired by the teachings of Swami Vivekananda to work for the nation and society.

Before Modi officially acknowledged his marriage, a group of activists and security professionals visited Jashodaben at her home. They offered to escort her on the Char Dham pilgrimage, which was a trip which she had long wanted to take. During the trip, they took her to the ashram of Swami Ramdev in Rishikesh, Uttarakhand. Journalists sought Jashodaben for comment at the news of the marriage, but her family told them that she would return home soon.

To contest the election, Modi's political opponents criticised his evasions of facts about his marriage on official documents. Nishant Varma, a citizen of Ahmedabad, sought criminal charges against Modi for having failed to acknowledge his legal wife and forge previous election documents as against prescribed rules of the Representation of the People Act. The case is subjected to revision in the Supreme Court of India. The lower court pronounced Modi as not guilty of any criminal offense under this Act.

In summer 2014, Congress party politician Ajay Rai filed a lawsuit to be heard by the Allahabad High Court complaining, among other things, that Modi did not give the permanent account number of Jashodaben.

The estrangement of Jashodaben and Modi has been discussed in the context of a broader trend in India that politicians may have more success if they are known for not having ties to a spouse. The RSS, which gives Modi political support, values celibacy in its senior leadership but contrarian tones have been noted.

Many Congress party politicians have criticised Modi's treatment of the estrangement of his wife.

== Media appearances and political activities ==
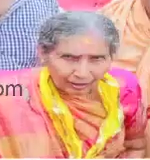
Jashodaben Modi in 2023

Jashodaben has made numerous media appearances.

In February 2014, a reporter for The Indian Express interviewed her. It was reported in April 2014 that she does not speak ill of her husband, and does not tolerate when others do so. In May 2014, TV9 Gujarat interviewed her on video. In June 2014, at what has been described as "her first public event", Jashodaben attended the public funeral of politician Gopinath Munde.

Jashodaben said that she was not invited to the swearing-in ceremony of Narendra Modi in 2014, but had she been invited, she would have gone. "I wish to be with him. If he calls me, I am eager to start a new life with him. But it has to be he who calls," she said in 2014.

In November 2014, she made her first trip to Mumbai, where she prayed for her husband at the Mahalakshmi Temple and the Siddhivinayak Temple. In December 2014, a writer for Pakistani news agency Dawn News said, "not many newspapers have had the courage to report the troubles which Jashodaben has experienced".

In June 2015, Jashodaben was scheduled to speak at a conference on politics organized by supporters of Modi. Event organizers reported that the conference was shut down on the second day of the week-long program on the direction of the BJP leader Amit Shah and others. No reason was given for cancelling the conference, but people in attendance claimed Jashodaben's presence as the cause.

In November 2015, Jashodaben applied for a passport in order to visit relatives and friends overseas. As she was unable to produce a marriage certificate or a joint affidavit from her husband, the application was rejected by the regional passport office as "incomplete". Her brother Ashok stated that a legal option was being considered.

== Request for information on security detail ==
I am surrounded by five security guards all the time. Often my relatives or I have to cook for them, my sister-in-law has to make their beds. This is a bit annoying... You see, it gets really chaotic when I have to travel, because I use public transport and the guards are following me in an air-conditioned car.

— Jashodaben Modi, to Reuters, November 2014

From May 2014, police from the Mehsana district began providing continual police protection for Jashodaben. The security agent team following her was assigned as a response to the Special Protection Group Act, which says that the spouse of the Prime Minister of India should receive police protection. The Salaries and Allowances of Ministers' Act describes other benefits which are typically given to spouses of prime ministers.

In November 2014, Jashodaben filed a Right to Information Act (RTI) request seeking details about her security and rights as the spouse of the prime minister. Various media organizations in India reported the RTI in different ways, including emphasizing Jashodaben's fear, the financial implications of her complaint, the guards' demands to be treated as guests, or the case as an example of female independence. Jashodaben has said that her security guards have refused to show any identification or to say on whose orders they have been assigned to her, and have suggested she refrain from talking with the media. The Gulf News reported that her security guards are primarily with her to conduct surveillance on her. Jashodaben's family has complained that her guards do not carry any identity cards, refuse to identify themselves, and refuse to name the person or office supervising them.

In December, the Intelligence Bureau denied her request for information about orders, saying that the law has an exemption which applies in this case. Jashodaben uses the name "Jashodaben Narendrabhai Modi", which is her married name. The letter was addressed to "Jashodaben, daughter of Chimanlal Modi" (her father's name). At the end of December 2014, Jashodaben filed an appeal to the refusal. In addition to the appeal, Jashodaben complained that the government officers changed her name from "Jashodaben Narendrabhai Modi" to her maiden name "Jashodaben Chimanlal Modi". Doordarshan, India's public television broadcaster, presented Jashodaben on television 1 January 2015 to hear her comments on the issue. As a result of this broadcast, the Ministry of Information and Broadcasting chastised staff at Doordashan and transferred the director of the broadcast from Ahmedabad to Port Blair 2,500 km away. On 6 February Jashodaben's request was again denied, and again addressed to "Jashodaben, Chimanlal Modi's daughter".

In May 2015, Jashodaben filed a third request for the information about the security detail and their orders. She also complained that she had completed the forms using her legal name, "Jashodaben Narendrabhai Modi", but the government office replied to her using her maiden name. In response to the filing, a government representative said, "If they are still not satisfied by the information given by the first appellate authority, they can file the second appeal at the Gujarat Information Commission." In response to the RTI request, commentator on women's issues Shobhaa De called Jashodaben a "superhero" and "plucky", and said that her actions were "bold, blunt, and to the point".
