= Raghuvir Singh Shastri =

Indian politician (1917–1982)

Member of Parliament, Lok Sabha
- In office 1967–1971
- Succeeded by: Ram Chandra Vikal
- Constituency: Baghpat, Uttar Pradesh

Personal details
- Born: 5 December 1917 Kakor, Meerut district Now in Baghpat District
- Died: 29 September 1982 (aged 64) Delhi, India
- Party: Independent
- Spouse: Ganga Devi

Raghuvir Singh Shastri (5 December 1917 – 29 September 1982) was an Indian politician. He was elected to the Lok Sabha, the lower house of the Parliament of India from the Baghpat, Uttar Pradesh.

Shastri died in Delhi on 29 September 1982, at the age of 64.
