= Lok Dal (Charan) =

Defunct political party in India

Lok Dal (Charan) or Lok Dal (Charan Singh), a political party in Uttar Pradesh, India. LD(C) was formed on 7 June 2003 when Rashtriya Lok Dal vice-president Rameshwar Singh split. Singh was opposed to the move of RLD to withdraw support from the Mayawati state cabinet. The party is named after Charan Singh, the founder of the original Lok Dal and father of RLD leader Ajit Singh.
