= Brahmanwada =

Brahmanwada Varwada
- Village
- Location in Gujarat, India Brahmanwada (India)
- Coordinates: 23.86594°N 72.35095°E
- Country: India
- State: Gujarat
- District: Mehsana

Government
  - Type: Gram panchayat

Population (2011)
  - Total: 10,000

Languages
  - Official: Gujarati
- Time zone: UTC+5:30 (IST)
- PIN: 384215
- Telephone code: 02767
- Vehicle registration: GJ
- Website: gujaratindia.com

Brahmanwada or Varwada is a village in Gujarat, India. It is located in the Unjha taluka of Mahesana district.

According to the 2011 census of India, the population of the village was 5,950.

It is 7 kilometres (4.3 mi) from Unjha, 32 kilometres (20 mi) from Mehsana, 89 kilometres (55 mi) from Gandhinagar and 105 kilometres (65 mi) from Ahmedabad.

== Notable people ==
It is the birthplace of Jashodaben Modi, the wife of Prime Minister of India Narendra Modi.
