= Spouse of the prime minister of India =

The spouse of the prime minister of India is the wife or husband of the prime minister of India. The prime minister's spouse does not have an officially defined role. According to protocol, they attend social functions and gatherings at home and overseas, but have no participatory role.

To date there have been ten women who have been married to prime ministers whilst in office. India has also had one bachelor, one separated, one widow, and two widowed prime ministers.

== List ==
#	Portrait	Name	Date of birth	Date of marriage	Prime Minister	Tenure began	Tenure ended	Date of death and age
1		Kamala Nehru (Note: Kamala Nehru, wife of Jawaharlal Nehru, died in 1936. Nehru's daughter Indira Gandhi served as a hostess during his tenure.)	1 August 1899	1916	Jawaharlal Nehru	15 August 1947	27 May 1964	28 February 1936
Acting		Lakshmi Nanda		February 1916	Gulzarilal Nanda (acting)	27 May 1964	9 June 1964	Unknown
Acting		Lakshmi Nanda		February 1916	Gulzarilal Nanda (acting)	11 January 1966	24 January 1966	Unknown
2		Lalita Shastri	11 January 1910	16 May 1928	Lal Bahadur Shastri	9 June 1964	11 January 1966	13 April 1993
3		Feroze Gandhi (Note: Feroze Gandhi, husband of Indira Gandhi, died in 1960. Her younger son, Sanjay Gandhi, served as host during her tenure.)	12 September 1912	26 March 1942	Indira Gandhi	24 January 1966	24 March 1977	8 September 1960
3		Feroze Gandhi	12 September 1912	26 March 1942	Indira Gandhi	14 January 1980	31 October 1984	8 September 1960
4		Gujraben Desai		1911	Morarji Desai	24 March 1977	28 July 1979	25 October 1981
5		Gayatri Devi	5 December 1905	5 June 1925	Charan Singh	28 July 1979	14 January 1980	10 May 2002
6		Sonia Gandhi	9 December 1946	25 February 1968	Rajiv Gandhi	31 October 1984	2 December 1989	
7		Sita Kumari		25 June 1955	V. P. Singh	2 December 1989	10 November 1990	
8		Duja Devi			Chandra Shekhar	10 November 1990	21 June 1991	22 August 1997
9		Satyamma Rao (Note: Satyamma Rao, the wife of P. V. Narasimha Rao, died in 1970. No known hostess has served during Rao's term.)			P. V. Narasimha Rao	21 June 1991	16 May 1996	1 July 1970
–		unmarried (Note: Vajpayee's adopted daughter Namita Kaul Bhattacharya served as the hostess during official functions.)			Atal Bihari Vajpayee	16 May 1996	1 June 1996	
–		unmarried			Atal Bihari Vajpayee	19 March 1998	19 May 2004	
10		Chennamma Deve Gowda		25 May 1954	H. D. Deve Gowda	1 June 1996	21 April 1997	18 July 2026
11		Sheila Gujral	24 January 1924	26 May 1945	Inder Kumar Gujral	21 April 1997	19 March 1998	11 July 2011
12		Gursharan Kaur	13 September 1937	14 September 1958	Manmohan Singh	22 May 2004	26 May 2014	
13		Jashodaben Modi (separated)	1951	1968	Narendra Modi	26 May 2014	Incumbent	

== See also ==
- List of prime ministers of India
- Nehru–Gandhi family
- First ladies and gentlemen of India
