= Rajkumar Sangwan =

Indian politician

Member of Parliament, Lok Sabha
- Incumbent
- Assumed office 4 June 2024
- Preceded by: Satya Pal Singh
- Constituency: Baghpat

Personal details
- Born: 5 March 1960 (age 66) Meerut, Uttar Pradesh, India
- Party: Rashtriya Lok Dal
- Education: Master of Arts; Doctor of Philosophy
- Alma mater: Chaudhary Charan Singh University
- Occupation: Politician

Rajkumar Sangwan (born 5 March 1960; Hindi pronunciation: [ɾaːd͡ʒkʊmaːɾ sãːgʋaːn̪]) is an Indian politician. He is Member of Lok Sabha, the lower house of the Parliament from Baghpat since 2024. He is a member of Rashtriya Lok Dal.

== Early life and education ==
Sangwan was born on 5 March 1960 in Uplehera village, Meerut, Uttar Pradesh to Sahab Singh and Girirajo Devi in a Hindu Jat family. He did Master of Arts and Doctor of Philosophy from Chaudhary Charan Singh University in Meerut.

== Political career ==
Sangwan began his political journey in student politics, inspired by Charan Singh, a prominent political figure and former Prime Minister of India. Within the Rashtriya Lok Dal (RLD), Sangwan has held several key positions, including national secretary and president of the Western Uttar Pradesh Youth RLD. He has also served as the state incharge of elections in Jharkhand and Bihar.
