= Sompal Shastri =

Indian politician

Union Minister of State for Agriculture
- In office 19 March 1998 – 13 October 1999
- Prime Minister: Atal Bihari Vajpayee
- Preceded by: Samudrala Venugopal Chary
- Succeeded by: Hukmdev Narayan Yadav

Member of Parliament, Lok Sabha
- In office 10 March 1998 – 26 April 1999
- Preceded by: Chaudhary Ajit Singh
- Succeeded by: Chaudhary Ajit Singh
- Constituency: Baghpat, Uttar Pradesh

Personal details
- Born: 20 January 1942 (age 84) Uttar Pradesh, India
- Party: Rashtriya Lok Dal
- Children: Sandeep Shastri
- Parent: Raghubir Singh Shastri (father)
- Education: B.A. (Hons.) Economics, M.A. (Economics), LL.B.
- Alma mater: University of Delhi
- Occupation: Politician

Sompal Shastri or Sompal Singh Shastri (born 20 January 1942) is an Indian politician, came from Farmer-Jat family and began his career as a politician of Rashtriya Lok Dal from Uttar Pradesh India. He has been Minister for Agriculture for the national government and a member of the Planning Commission. He is Vice Chairman, State Planning Board, Madhya Pradesh.

== Career ==
Sompal won in 1998 defeating Rashtriya Lok Dal's chief Chaudhary Ajit Singh from Baghpat. But lost to Chaudhary Ajit Singh in 1999 by a margin of over 1.54 lakh votes.

Sompal's father was Raghubir Singh Shastri, and represented Baghpat in the fourth Lok Sabha. He graduated from Boys High School in Allahabad now Prayagraj, 1957; B.A. Hons. (Economics), Delhi University, 1961; M.A. (Economics), Delhi University, 1964; LL.B., Delhi University, 1967.

In September 2013, Sompal Shastri refused to contest Lok Sabha polls under the Samajwadi Party banner. In a letter written to party president Mulayam Singh Yadav, Mr. Shastri said he was not in a position to contest the Lok Sabha polls from Baghpat after the violence in which over 38 people were killed. The incidents of communal violence in Muzaffarnagar, Shamli and Baghpat were unfortunate, he said.
