= Chhaprauli Assembly constituency =

Constituency of the Uttar Pradesh legislative assembly in India

Chhaprauli
- Constituency No. 50 for the Uttar Pradesh Legislative Assembly

Constituency details
- Country: India
- Region: North India
- State: Uttar Pradesh
- District: Baghpat
- Total electors: 3,29,441 (2019)
- Reservation: None

Member of Legislative Assembly
- 18th Uttar Pradesh Legislative Assembly
- Incumbent Ajay Kumar
- Party: RLD
- Alliance: NDA
- Elected year: 2022

Chhaprauli Assembly constituency is one of the 403 constituencies of the Uttar Pradesh Legislative Assembly, India. It is a part of the Baghpat district and one of the five assembly constituencies in the Baghpat Lok Sabha constituency. First election in this assembly constituency was held in 1967 after the "Delimitation order" was passed and the constituency was constituted in 1967. The constituency was assigned identification number 50 after the "Delimitation of Parliamentary and Assembly Constituencies Order, 2008" was passed.

== Wards / Areas ==
Extent of Chhaprauli Assembly constituency is KCs Chhaprauli, Binoli, PCs Mukarrabpur Kandera, Kishanpur, Asara, Bhudpur, Kasimpur Kheri of Baraut KC, Doghat NP, Tikri NP & Chhaprauli NP of Baraut Tehsil.

== Members of the Legislative Assembly ==
Year	Member	Party
1967	Charan Singh	Indian National Congress
1969	Charan Singh	Bharatiya Kranti Dal
1974	Charan Singh	Bharatiya Kranti Dal
1977	Narendra Singh	Janata Party
1980	Narendra Singh	Janata Party (Secular)
1985	Saroj Verma	Lokdal
1988^	Narender Singh	Janata Party
1989	Narender Singh	Janata Dal
1991	Ajit Singh	Janata Dal
1993	Narendra Singh	Janata Dal
1996	Gajendra Kumar	Bharatiya Kisan Kamgar Party
2002	Ajay Kumar	Rashtriya Lok Dal
2007	Ajay Tomar	Rashtriya Lok Dal
2012	Virpal Rathi	Rashtriya Lok Dal
2017	Sahender Singh Ramala	Rashtriya Lok Dal
2022	Ajay Kumar	Rashtriya Lok Dal

== Election results ==
=== 2027 ===
2027 Uttar Pradesh Legislative Assembly election: Chhaprauli
Party	Candidate	Votes	%	±%
INDIA				
NDA				
BSP				
NOTA	None of the above			
Majority				
Turnout				
gain from		Swing		

=== 2022 ===
2022 Uttar Pradesh Legislative Assembly election: Chhaprauli
Party	Candidate	Votes	%	±%
RLD	Ajay Kumar	111,880	53.3	+20.76
BJP	Sahender Singh Ramala	82,372	39.24	+8.62
BSP	Sahik	9,774	4.66	−10.45
NOTA	None of the above	886	0.42	−0.1
Majority		29,508	14.06	+12.14
Turnout		209,904	62.28	−0.67
RLD hold		Swing		

=== 2017 ===
2017 Uttar Pradesh Legislative Assembly election: Chhaprauli
Party	Candidate	Votes	%	±%
RLD	Sahender Singh	65,124	32.54	
BJP	Satender Singh	61,282	30.62	
SP	Manoj Chaudhary	39,841	19.91	
BSP	Rajbala	30,241	15.11	
NOTA	None of the above	1,027	0.52	
Majority		3,842	1.92	
Turnout		200,152	62.95	

=== 2012 ===
2012 Assembly Elections: Chhaprauli
Party	Candidate	Votes	%	±%
RLD	Vir Pal	69,394	47.69	−
BSP	Dev Pal Singh	47,823	32.86	−
SP	Manoj Kumar	14,103	9.69	−
	Remainder 10 candidates	14,204	9.76	−
Majority		21,571	14.82	−
Turnout		145,524	52.05	−
RLD hold		Swing		

== See also ==
- Baghpat district
- Baghpat Lok Sabha constituency
- Sixteenth Legislative Assembly of Uttar Pradesh
- Uttar Pradesh Legislative Assembly
