= Siwalkhas Assembly constituency =

Constituency of the Uttar Pradesh legislative assembly in India

Siwalkhas
- Constituency No. 43 for the Uttar Pradesh Legislative Assembly

Constituency details
- Country: India
- Region: North India
- State: Uttar Pradesh
- District: Meerut
- Total electors: 3,30,305 (2019)
- Reservation: None

Member of Legislative Assembly
- 18th Uttar Pradesh Legislative Assembly
- Incumbent Ghulam Mohammed
- Party: RLD
- Alliance: NDA
- Elected year: 2022

Siwalkhas Assembly constituency is one of the 403 constituencies of the Uttar Pradesh Legislative Assembly, India. It is a part of the Meerut district and one of the five assembly constituencies in the Baghpat Lok Sabha constituency. First election in this assembly constituency was held in 1974 after the "Delimitation Order, 1967" was passed and the constituency was constituted in 1967. The constituency is assigned identification number 43 subsequent to the "Delimitation of Parliamentary and Assembly Constituencies Order, 2008".

== Wards / Areas ==
Extent of Siwalkhas Assembly constituency is KCs Rohta, Jani Khurd, Siwalkhas NP of Meerut Tehsil; KC Saroorpur & Karnawal NP of Sardhana Tehsil.

== Members of the Legislative Assembly ==
Year	Member	Party
1974	Ramjilal Sahayak	Indian National Congress
1977	Hari Singh	Janata Party
1980	Hem Chand Nimesh	Indian National Congress (I)
1985	Nanak Chand	Indian National Congress
1989	Charan Singh	Janata Dal
1991	Charan Singh	Janata Dal
1993	Charan Singh	Janata Dal
1996	Vanarsi Das Chandna	Bharatiya Kisan Kamgar Party
2002	Ranveer Rana	Rashtriya Lok Dal
2007	Vinod Kumar Harit	Bahujan Samaj Party
2012	Ghulam Mohammed	Samajwadi Party
2017	Jitendra Pal Singh	Bharatiya Janata Party
2022	Ghulam Mohammed	Rashtriya Lok Dal

== Election results ==
=== 2027 ===
2027 Uttar Pradesh Legislative Assembly election: Siwalkhas
Party	Candidate	Votes	%	±%
INDIA				
NDA				
BSP				
NOTA	None of the above			
Majority				
Turnout				
gain from		Swing		

=== 2022 ===
2022 Uttar Pradesh Legislative Assembly election: Siwalkhas
Party	Candidate	Votes	%	±%
RLD	Ghulam Mohammad	101,749	43.54	+23.7
BJP	Manendra Pal Singh	92,567	39.61	+7.29
BSP	Mukarram Ali khan	29,958	12.82	−6.05
AIMIM	Rafat Khan	3,019	1.29	
NOTA	None of the above	929	0.4	−0.08
Majority		9,182	3.93	−1.14
Turnout		233,667	68.78	−1.93
RLD gain from BJP		Swing		

=== 2017 ===
2017 Uttar Pradesh Legislative Assembly election: Siwalkhas
Party	Candidate	Votes	%	±%
BJP	Jitendra Pal Singh	72,842	32.32	
SP	Ghulam Mohammad	61,421	27.25	
RLD	Yashveer Singh	44,710	19.84	
BSP	Nadeem Chauhan	42,524	18.87	
NOTA	None of the above	1,086	0.48	
Majority		11,421	5.07	
Turnout		225,365	70.71	
BJP gain from SP		Swing		

=== 2012 ===
2012 Uttar Pradesh Legislative Assembly election: Siwalkhas
Party	Candidate	Votes	%	±%
SP	Ghulam Mohammed	58,852	31.28	−
RLD	Yashveer Singh	55,265	29.37	−
BSP	Jagat Singh	44,260	23.52	−
	Remainder 12 candidates	29,795	15.83	−
Majority		3,587	1.91	−
Turnout		188,172	65.69	−
SP gain from BSP		Swing		

== See also ==
- Baghpat Lok Sabha constituency
- Meerut district
- Sixteenth Legislative Assembly of Uttar Pradesh
- Uttar Pradesh Legislative Assembly
