= Ajay Kumar (Uttar Pradesh politician) =

Indian politician

Member of the Uttar Pradesh Legislative Assembly
- Incumbent
- Assumed office March 2022
- Preceded by: Sahender Singh
- Constituency: Chhaprauli
- In office February 2002 – April 2007
- Preceded by: Gajendra Kumar Munna
- Succeeded by: Ajay Tomar
- Constituency: Chhaprauli

Personal details
- Born: 1 November 1957 (age 68) Vazidpur, Uttar Pradesh, India
- Party: Rashtriya Lok Dal
- Spouse: Manju Singh (m. 1985)
- Children: 2
- Education: Chaudhary Charan Singh University, Meerut (Ph.D)
- Profession: Agriculturalist; teacher

Ajay Kumar (born 1 November 1957) is an Indian politician and member of the 18th Uttar Pradesh Legislative Assembly, representing the Chhaprauli constituency as a Rashtriya Lok Dal candidate since March 2022. He was also a member of the 14th Legislative Assembly of Uttar Pradesh from 2002 to 2007.

== Personal life ==
Ajay Kumar was born to Mahak Singh on 1 November 1957 in Vazidpur village of Baghpat district. He completed his Ph.D. from Chaudhary Charan Singh University, Meerut in 1997. Kumar married Manju Singh on 13 February 1985, with whom he has two sons. Kumar is an agriculturalist and a teacher by profession.

== Political career ==
Kumar, a member of the Rashtriya Lok Dal political party, was elected to the Uttar Pradesh Legislative Assembly for the first time after he won from the Chhaprauli constituency, defeating Rajpal of Bahujan Samaj Party by a margin of 63,686 votes in 2002 Uttar Pradesh Legislative Assembly election, succeeding Gajendra Kumar Munna of Bharatiya Kisan Kamgar Party in the process. As part of the 14th Legislative Assembly of Uttar Pradesh, he served as a member of the Estimates Committee till 2003. From 2003 to 2005, he was a member of Delegated Legislative Committee and from 2004 to 2005, was part of the Legislative Library Advisory Committee. He was succeeded by Ajay Tomar in the 2007.

In the 2022 Uttar Pradesh Legislative Assembly election, Kumar, again as the Rashtriya Lok Dal candidate for the Chhaprauli constituency seat, went on to defeat incumbent Sahender Singh of the Bharatiya Janata Party by a margin of 29,508 votes, succeeding the latter in the process.
