= Gayatri Devi (Uttar Pradesh politician) =

Indian politician (1905–2002)

Spouse of the Prime Minister of India
- In role 28 July 1979 – 14 January 1980
- Prime Minister: Charan Singh
- Preceded by: Gujraben Desai
- Succeeded by: Feroze Gandhi

Member of Parliament, Lok Sabha
- In office 18 January 1980 – 31 December 1984
- Preceded by: Chandan Singh
- Succeeded by: Akhtar Hasan
- Constituency: Kairana, Uttar Pradesh

Member of the Uttar Pradesh Legislative Assembly
- In office 5 February 1969 – 23 February 1974
- Preceded by: M.L. Gautam
- Succeeded by: Rajendra Singh
- Constituency: Iglas, Uttar Pradesh

Personal details
- Born: 5 December 1905 Sonipat, British India (present-day Haryana)
- Died: 10 May 2002 (aged 96)
- Party: Janata Party (Secular)
- Other political affiliations: Bharatiya Kranti Dal (before 1980)
- Spouse: Charan Singh (m. 1925)
- Children: 6, including Ajit Singh

Gayatri Devi (5 December 1905 – 10 May 2002) was an Indian politician. She was Spouse of the Prime Minister of India, Charan Singh. She was elected to the 7th Lok Sabha, the lower house of the Parliament from Kairana, Uttar Pradesh. She was also elected to the Uttar Pradesh Legislative Assembly. She was the first and only female MLA from Mathura.

== Early life ==
She was born on 5 December 1905 at Garhi Kundal village in Sonipat district in the Indian state of Haryana.

== Career ==
=== Uttar Pradesh Legislative Assembly ===
Gayatri Devi began her reluctant political journey in 1969 when she became a consensus candidate due to the warring political factions of the Bhartiya Kranti Dal (BKD) in Mathura district who couldn’t agree on each other’s candidature. She was elected to the Uttar Pradesh Legislative Assembly from the Iglas constituency in 1969 for her first term under the banner of the BKD. She then won from the Gokul assembly, also in Mathura district, for a second term in 1974. She was elected to these both assemblies under the banner of Bharatiya Kranti Dal, led by Charan Singh. She remains to date the first and only woman to get elected to the Legislative Assembly from Mathura.

=== Parliament, Lok Sabha ===
After her tenure in the state assembly, She transitioned to national politics. She was elected as a Member of Parliament (MP) to the 7th Lok Sabha from the Kairana constituency in Uttar Pradesh as a member of the Janata Party (Secular). She served as MP from 18 January 1980 to 31 December 1984.

== Personal life ==
She married Chaudhary Charan Singh, 5th Prime Minister of India on 5 June 1925. The couple had six children, including Ajit Singh, a noted politician and also former Union Cabinet Minister.

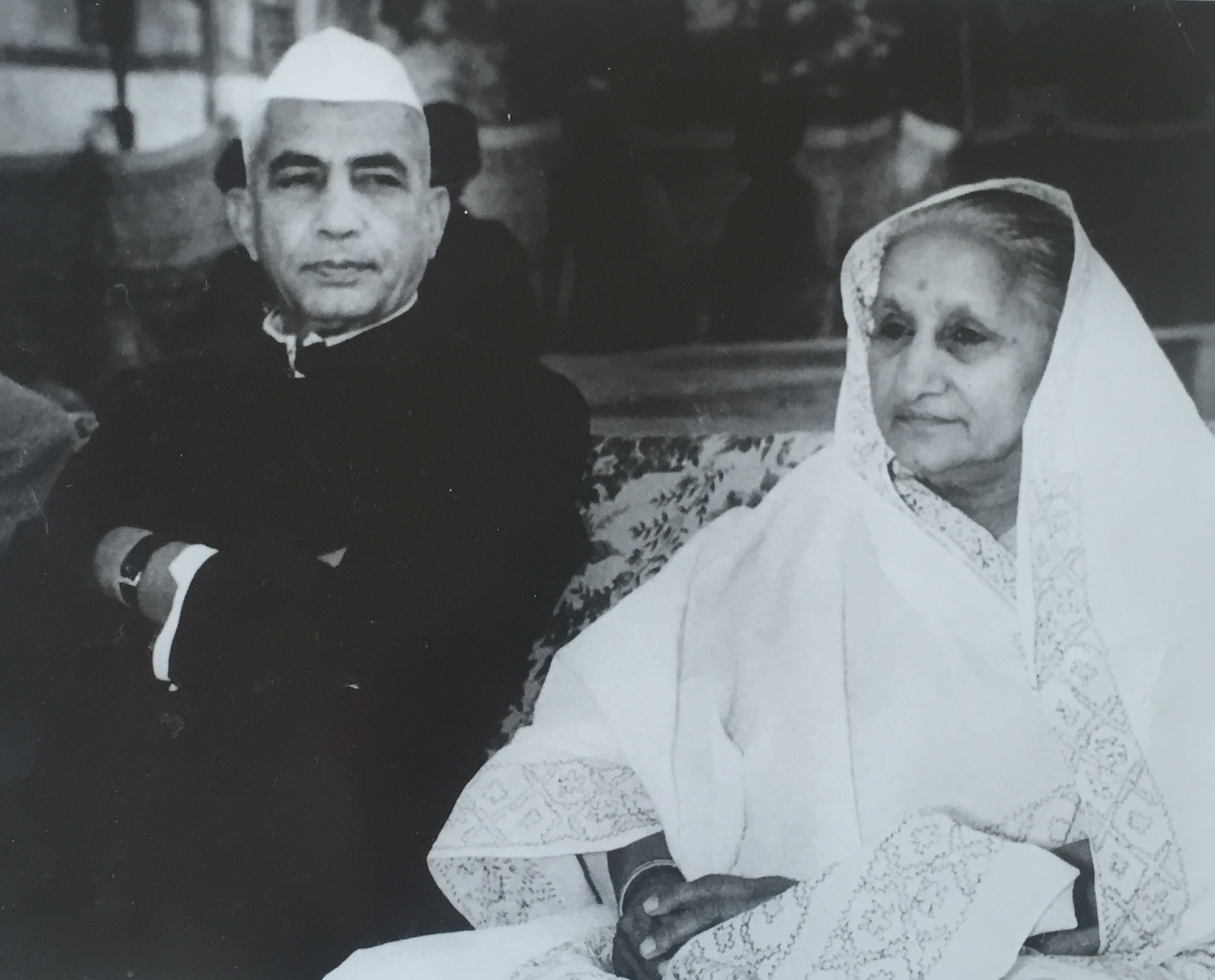
Gayatri Devi with Charan Singh

== Death ==
She died on 10 May 2002 after prolonged illness at the age of 96.
