= Manju Shiwach =

Indian politician

Dr. Manju Shiwach

Member of the Uttar Pradesh legislative assembly
- Incumbent
- Assumed office 2017
- Preceded by: Sudesh Sharma
- Constituency: Modinagar, Uttar Pradesh

Personal details
- Party: Bharatiya Janata Party

Manju Shiwach (born 1963) is an Indian politician from Uttar Pradesh. She was a two-time member of the 17th Legislative Assembly of Uttar Pradesh of India.

== Early life and education ==
Shiwach is from Uttar Pradesh. She did her medical education at Meerut University in 1987. Apart from her MBBS, she also did a Diploma in Obstetrics and Gynecology, also from Meerut University in 1992 and she is practices as a gynaecologist. Her husband Devendra Shiwach is also a doctor.

== Career ==
Shiwach first won the 2017 Uttar Pradesh Legislative Assembly election from the Modinagar Assembly constituency in Ghaziabad district of Uttar Pradesh representing the Bharatiya Janata Party. She polled 1,08,631 votes and defeated her nearest rival, Wahab Chaudhary of the Bahujan Samaj Party by a margin of 66,582 votes. She retained the seat for the BJP winning the 2022 Uttar Pradesh Legislative Assembly election where she polled 1,13,349 votes and defeated Sudesh Sharma of RLD by a margin of 34,619 votes.
