= Ajit Singh (politician, born 1939) =

Indian politician (1939–2021)

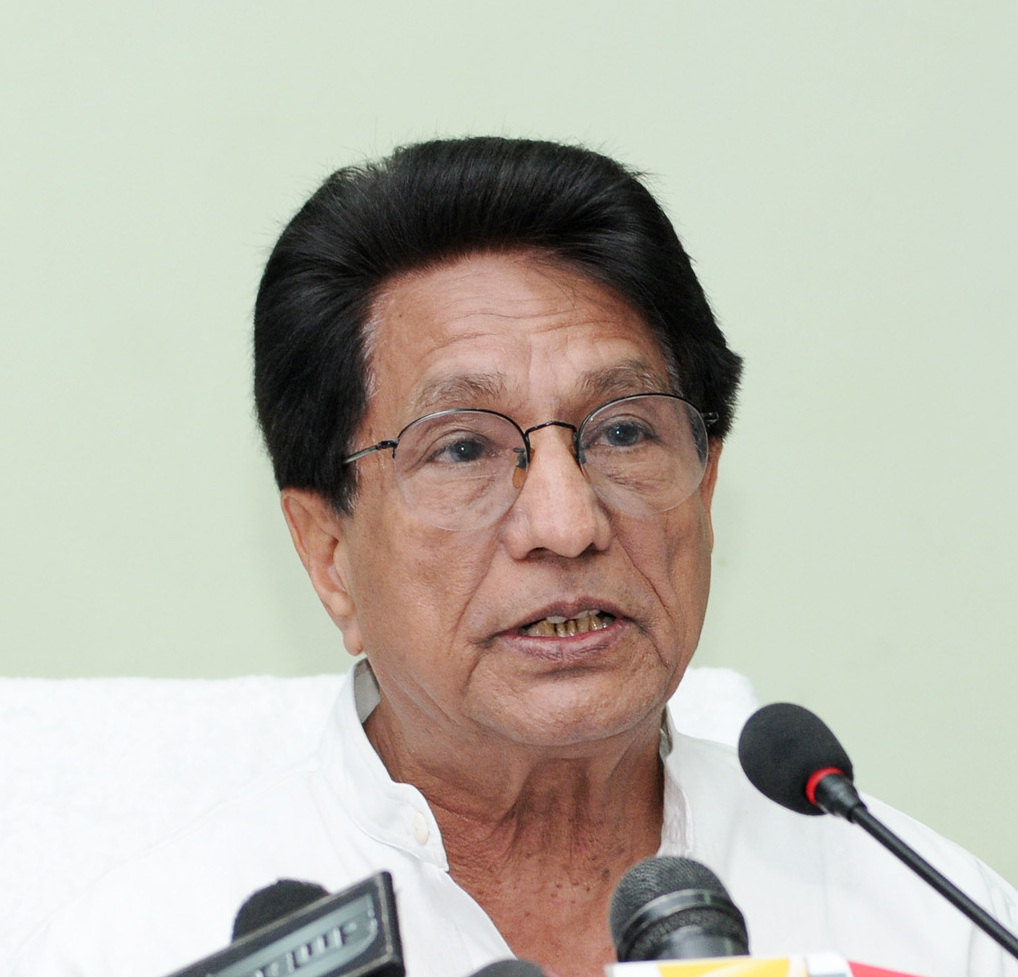
- Singh in 2012

Union Minister of Civil Aviation
- In office 18 December 2011 – 26 May 2014
- Prime Minister: Manmohan Singh
- Deputy: K. C. Venugopal
- Preceded by: Vayalar Ravi
- Succeeded by: Ashok Gajapathi Raju

Union Minister of Agriculture
- In office 22 July 2001 – 24 May 2003
- Prime Minister: Atal Bihari Vajpayee
- Deputy: Thounaojam Chaoba Singh; Debendra Pradhan; Shripad Yesso Naik; Hukmdev Narayan Yadav
- Preceded by: Nitish Kumar
- Succeeded by: Rajnath Singh

Union Minister of Food
- In office 10 February 1995 – 16 May 1996
- Prime Minister: P. V. Narasimha Rao
- Preceded by: P. V. Narasimha Rao
- Succeeded by: Atal Bihari Vajpayee

Union Minister of Industry
- In office 6 December 1989 – 10 November 1990
- Prime Minister: V. P. Singh
- Deputy: Srikant Kumar Jena
- Preceded by: Dinesh Singh
- Succeeded by: Pranab Mukherjee

Member of Parliament, Lok Sabha
- In office 6 October 1999 – 16 May 2014
- Preceded by: Sompal Shastri
- Succeeded by: Satyapal Singh
- Constituency: Baghpat
- In office 1 December 1989 – 5 March 1998
- Preceded by: Charan Singh
- Succeeded by: Sompal Shastri
- Constituency: Baghpat

President of Janata Party
- In office 1988–1990
- Preceded by: Chandra Shekhar
- Succeeded by: Subramanian Swamy

Personal details
- Born: 12 February 1939 Bhadola, United Provinces, British India
- Died: 6 May 2021 (aged 82) Gurugram, Haryana, India
- Party: Rashtriya Lok Dal
- Other political affiliations: Indian National Congress; Janata Dal; Janata Party; Lok Dal
- Spouse: Radhika Singh (m. 1967)
- Children: 3, including Jayant Chaudhary
- Parents: Charan Singh (father); Gayatri Devi (mother)
- Education: University of Lucknow; IIT Kharagpur; Illinois Institute of Technology

Ajit Singh (12 February 1939 – 6 May 2021) was an Indian politician, farmer leader, and founder of the Rashtriya Lok Dal (RLD), a regional political party rooted in Uttar Pradesh and Rajasthan, dedicated to advocating farmers’ rights and rural interests. Singh entered the Rajya Sabha in 1986 and later represented Baghpat in the Lok Sabha across seven terms between 1989 and 2014, navigating multiple party affiliations including the Janata Dal, Lok Dal (Ajit), and eventually Rashtriya Lok Dal, which he established in 1996. He held several Union cabinet positions - Minister of Industry (1989–1990), Minister of Food (1995–1996), Minister of Agriculture (2001–2003), and Minister of Civil Aviation (2011–2014)- reflecting his influence in both economic and rural policy domains.

Born in Meerut, Uttar Pradesh, to former prime minister Charan Singh, he inherited a legacy of agrarian advocacy but initially pursued a career in technology, earning a B.Tech from IIT Kharagpur and an M.S. from the Illinois Institute of Technology, followed by a 15-year stint at IBM. A key figure in coalition politics, Singh’s career was marked by his commitment to agricultural reforms and strategic alliances, notably with the BJP and Congress, until his death from COVID-19 in 2021. His son, Jayant Chaudhary, succeeded him as RLD president, continuing his political lineage.

== Early life and education ==
Ajit Singh was born on 12 February 1939 in Bhadola village, Meerut district, United Provinces (now part of Uttar Pradesh and Uttarakhand), to Gayatri Devi and Charan Singh, prime minister of India from 1979 to 1980. He grew up in a Hindu Jat family which was deeply rooted in politics and agriculture. He completed his early schooling in Meerut, before pursuing higher education. Singh earned a Bachelor of Science degree from Lucknow University and went on to study at the Indian Institute of Technology Kharagpur (IIT Kharagpur), where he obtained a Bachelor of Technology. He furthered his education abroad, securing a Master of Science from the Illinois Institute of Technology in the United States. After his studies, Singh worked in the computer industry in the US for 15 years, including a notable stint with IBM during the 1960s and early 1970s, before returning to India and entering politics in 1986.

== Political career ==
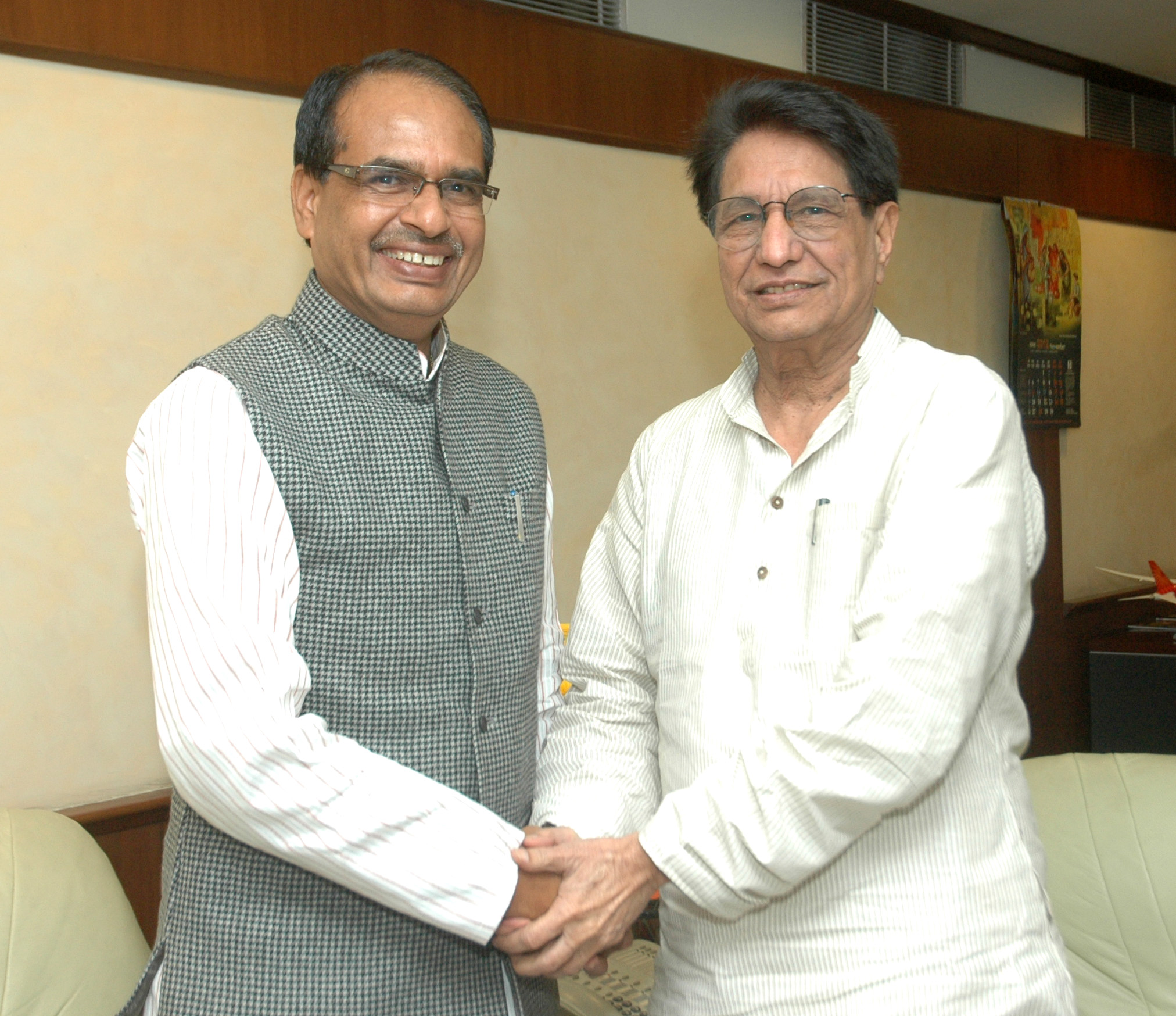
The Chief Minister of Madhya Pradesh, Shivraj Singh Chauhan meeting the Union Minister for Civil Aviation, Ajit Singh, in New Delhi on 21 November 2012.

Singh was one of the most dynamic leaders of India, especially worked for farmers and on the economic condition of India. When he was Commerce and Industry Minister in V. P. Singh's government, he drafted and tried to pass the bill against License Raj, which was unsuccessful since most of the parties were against it. When the Chandra Shekhar Government fell, prime minister P.V Narasimha Rao and Finance Minister Manmohan Singh passed the same bill in the Parliament. This bill was one of the major reforms of Indian history better known as the Liberalisation reforms of India, which opened the country for the Global market.

Ajit Singh entered into politics in May 1986 by joining Lok Dal. He was made general secretary and a member of central parliamentary board of Lok Dal. Within months of joining politics, he removed Mulayam Singh Yadav from the position of Lok Dal legislature party leader in Uttar Pradesh Legislative Assembly.

Ajit Singh was first elected to Rajya Sabha (the upper house of Indian Parliament) in 1986 after his father and former prime minister Charan Singh became ill. He was the President of Lok Dal (A). In 1988, he merged Lok Dal (A) with Janata Party and became president of Janata Party. In 1989, he was General Secretary of Janata Dal after all the parties decided to merge under the leadership of VP Singh to take on the Indian National Congress. Ajit Singh brought in most political strength from Uttar Pradesh to VP Singh during that election.

He was elected to Lok Sabha (the lower house of Indian Parliament) from Baghpat in 1989. He was Minister of Industry in V. P. Singh's cabinet from December 1989 to November 1990. He was re-elected to Lok Sabha in 1991 Indian general election. He served as Minister of Food in P. V. Narasimha Rao's cabinet.

Ajit Singh was re-elected in 1996 as a Congress candidate but resigned from the party and Lok Sabha in 1996. He then founded Bharatiya Kisan Kamgar Party and was re-elected in a Baghpat 1997 by-election. In 1999, he relaunched his party with the name Rashtriya Lok Dal. He lost the 1998 election and was re-elected in 1999, 2004 and 2009. From 2001 to 2003, he was Minister of Agriculture in Atal Bihari Vajpayee's government. After his party joined the ruling United Progressive Alliance in 2011, he was Minister of Civil Aviation from December 2011 to May 2014. In 2019 Indian general election, He contested from Muzaffarnagar but lost to Sanjeev Balyan of BJP by a very small margin of 6526 votes.

== Personal life ==
He was married to Radhika Singh, and had one son and two daughters. His son, Jayant Chaudhary, was a member of the 15th Lok Sabha from Mathura, Uttar Pradesh.

== Death ==
Singh died on 6 May 2021 on 8:20 AM IST at the age of 82, due to complications from COVID-19. He had tested positive for COVID on 20 April 2021 and was admitted to a private hospital in Gurugram, Haryana, where his condition deteriorated due to a lung infection. His son, Jayant Chaudhary, confirmed his death, noting that Singh “battled his condition till the very end.” Due to the ongoing covid pandemic, his cremation was a low-key affair in Delhi, attended only by close family members to comply with COVID-19 protocols. Singh’s death prompted widespread condolences from political leaders, including prime minister Narendra Modi, who praised his dedication to farmers, and congress leader Rahul Gandhi, who expressed sorrow at the loss.

== See also ==
- Janata Dal (Ajit)

Lok Sabha
Preceded by Charan Singh	Member of Parliament for Baghpat; 1989 – 1998	Succeeded by Sompal Shastri
Preceded by Sompal Shastri	Member of Parliament for Baghpat; 1999 – 2014	Succeeded by Satya Pal Singh
Political offices
Preceded by Jalagam Vengala Rao	Minister of Industry; 5 December 1989 - 10 November 1990	Succeeded by K. Karunakaran
Preceded by Nitish Kumar	Minister of Agriculture; 2 July 2001 - 23 May 2003	Succeeded by Rajnath Singh
Preceded by Vayalar Ravi	Minister of Civil Aviation; 8 December 2011 - 26 May 2014	Succeeded by Ashok Gajapathi Raju
