= Ram Chandra Vikal =

Indian politician

Deputy Chief Minister of Uttar Pradesh
- In office 3 April 1967 – 25 February 1969 Serving with Narain Singh and Ram Prakash Gupta
- Governor: Bezawada Gopala Reddy
- Chief Minister: Charan Singh
- Preceded by: Office established
- Succeeded by: Kamalapati Tripathi

Member of Parliament, Rajya Sabha
- In office 3 April 1984 – 2 April 1990
- Preceded by: Krishna Chandra Pant
- Succeeded by: K. N. Singh
- Constituency: Uttar Pradesh

Member of Parliament, Lok Sabha
- In office 15 March 1971 – 18 January 1977
- Preceded by: Raghuvir Singh Shastri
- Succeeded by: Charan Singh
- Constituency: Baghpat Lok Sabha constituency

Leader of the Opposition Uttar Pradesh Legislative Assembly
- In office 2 March 1967 – 2 April 1967
- Chief Minister: Chandra Bhanu Gupta
- Preceded by: Madhav Prasad Tripathi
- Succeeded by: Chandra Bhanu Gupta

Cabinet Minister Government of Uttar Pradesh
- In office 3 April 1967 – 25 February 1969
- Chief Minister: Charan Singh
- Ministry & Departments: Agriculture; Forests and Animal Husbandry; Excise; Irrigation; Jail; Fisheries

Personal details
- Born: 8 November 1916 Nayagaon Basantpur, Ghaziabad district, British India (now India)
- Died: 26 June 2011 (aged 94) India
- Party: Indian National Congress
- Other political affiliations: Independent politician (1967); Uttar Pradesh Kisan Mazdoor Party (1967 - 1971)
- Education: Middle Temple
- Profession: Politician

Ram Chandra Vikal (8 November 1916 in Nayagaon Basantpur, Gautam Buddha Nagar district – 26 June 2011) was a freedom fighter. He was an agriculture minister and was elected twice as a Member of Parliament as well as a five-time Member of the Legislative Assembly. He had charge of Jammu and Kashmir during the governments of Indira Gandhi and Rajiv Gandhi. He was also a well known yoga teacher. Vikal was influenced by the ideology of the Arya Samaj from childhood and participated in the freedom movement from his student days. An agriculturist, Vikal championed the cause of the farmers, labourers and backward classes, and was instrumental in implementing various social welfare measures such as getting irrigation rates reduced and land revenue written off.

He also contributed to the setting up of various infrastructure facilities in the towns and villages of Uttar Pradesh by having bridges and railway lines constructed. He was also instrumental in getting several primary schools and colleges set up, establishing agricultural universities in Faizabad and Kanpur and a medical college in Meerut. Vikal was awarded the Degree of Vidyavachaspati, Honoris Causa, by the Gurukul Mahavidyalaya, Jwalapur (Haridwar).

== Career ==
Ram Chandra Vikal started his legislative career as a Member of the Uttar Pradesh Legislative Assembly in 1952 and was Member of that Assembly from 1952 to 1971. He held various ministerial posts — Forests and Animal Husbandry, Excise, Agriculture, Irrigation, Jail and Fisheries – in the government of Uttar Pradesh from 1967 to 1970. He was also Leader of the Opposition in the Uttar Pradesh Legislative Assembly in 1967 and Chairman of State Farms Corporation of India from 1982 to 1984.

Vikal was a Member of the Fifth Lok Sabha from Bagpat and represented Uttar Pradesh in the Rajya Sabha from April 1984 to April 1990.

Shri Ram Chandra Vikal had actively participated in the freedom struggle from his student life and fought against British rule during pre-Independence period. He gave up studies on the call of Mahatama Gandhi, boycotted foreign-made clothes and actively worked for the Congress Party. Shri Vikal gave up the teaching profession after assassination of Mahatama Gandhi. He worked for World Peace and in this respect, attended World Peace Conference held in Japan, 1970. He had maintained healthy and sound relations with Fuji Guruji of Japan. He also participated in various activities relating to social change during post-Independence period as well. Shri Vikal was weighed by farmers with silver (2 maunds and 17 seers) on 26 January 1963 which was donated to Pt. Jawaharlal Nehru for National Defence. He was instrumental in opening 100 primary schools, several Intermediate and Degree colleges in his constituency, Agricultural Universities in Faizabad and Kanpur and Medical college at Meerut. He played main role in setting up a Fertilizer Factory at Phulpur, Allahabad. It was due to his efforts that the abandoned Shahadara-Saharanpur narrow-gauge line was converted into broad-gauge line. Shri Vikal was Member of Legislative Assembly, Uttar Pradesh from 1952 to 1971 and the Member of Parliament of Fifth Lok Sabha. He was elected to the Rajya Sabha from April, 1984 to 1990. During the leaderships of Smt. Indira Gandhi, Shri Rajiv Gandhi and Shri P.V. Narsingh Rao, he was the member of Working Committee of AICC from 1977 to 1991.

Shri Vikal was the Founder and President of Kisan Mazdoor Party, 1967 and President of All India Backward Classes Cell of Congress since 1967. He was vice-president of Congress Committee of Uttar Pradesh in 1972. He was the Chairman of Assurance Committee, U.P. Legislative Assembly in 1970–71. He was also the Chairman of State Farm Corporation of India from March, 1982 to 1984.

Shri Vikal was the Member of Zila Parishad, Bullandshahar in 1948. He was also the Member of AICC from 1958 to 1971. He had been the Member of Estimates Committee of U.P. Assembly for two years. He was the Member of Standing Committee of Irrigation and Power and Finance. He was at the Panel of chairmen, U.P. Legislative Assembly from 1969 to 1970. He was Member of Business Advisory Committee, Rajya Sabha from 1984 to 1985. He was elected Leader of S.V.D. and Leader of Opposition, U.P. Legislative Assembly, 1967. He held the office of Minister of Forests and Animal Husbandry, Excise, Jail and Fisheries, Agriculture, Irrigation. He was the Chairman of all India Kisan Congress.

== Deputy Chief Minister of Uttar Pradesh ==
In 1967, after differences in the Congress, he worked with Chaudhary Charan Singh and Ram Chandra Vikal gain CM title but he gave cm title to Charan singh and after that Ram Chandra Vikal was made the Deputy Chief Minister by Charan Singh.Deputy Chief Minister, he was the Deputy Chief Minister of Uttar Pradesh from 1967 to 1969.
