= Ghulam Mohammed (politician) =

Indian politician

Member of the Uttar Pradesh Legislative Assembly
- Incumbent
- Assumed office March 2022
- Preceded by: Jitendra Pal Singh
- Constituency: Siwalkhas
- In office March 2012 – March 2017
- Preceded by: Vinod Kumar Harit
- Succeeded by: Jitendra Pal Singh (Billu)
- Constituency: Siwalkhas

Personal details
- Born: 19 January 1953 (age 73) Meerut district, Uttar Pradesh
- Party: Rashtriya Lok Dal(2022-present)
- Other political affiliations: Samajwadi Party(2010-2022)
- Spouse: Salma Begum (wife)
- Parent: Sadaq Ali (father)
- Education: Chaudhary Charan Singh University
- Profession: Teacher & Politician

Ghulam Mohammed (Hindi: ग़ुलाम मुहम्मद) is an Indian politician and a member of the Uttar Pradesh Legislative Assembly of India. He represents the Siwalkhas constituency of Uttar Pradesh and is a member of the Rashtriya Lok Dal political party.

== Early life and education ==
Ghulam Mohammed was born in Meerut district, Uttar Pradesh. He attended the Chaudhary Charan Singh University and attained Bachelor of Education & Bachelor of Laws degrees.

== Political career ==
Ghulam Mohammed has been a MLA for one term.He represented the Siwalkhas constituency and is a member of the RLD political party.

== Posts Held ==
#	From	To	Position	Comments
01	2012	2017	Member, 16th Legislative Assembly	
02	2022	Incumbent	Member, 18th Legislative Assembly	

== See also ==
- Siwalkhas (Assembly constituency)
- Sixteenth Legislative Assembly of Uttar Pradesh
- Uttar Pradesh Legislative Assembly
- 18th Uttar Pradesh Assembly
