= Bharatiya Kisan Kamgar Party =

- Abbreviation: BKKP
- Founder: Ajit Singh
- Founded: 1996; 30 years ago
- Dissolved: 1999
- Split from: Indian National Congress
- Merged into: Rashtriya Lok Dal
- ECI status: dissolved party

Bharatiya Kisan Kamgar Party (abbr. BKKP) was an Indian political party formed in 1996 by Ajit Singh. Within months of winning Baghpat Lok Sabha constituency from Congress ticket in 1996 Lok Sabha election, Ajit Singh resigned from Congress to form his new party BKKP, with the help of Mahendra Singh Tikait. He contested Baghpat by-poll election on BKKP ticket and won by a margin of 231,440 votes. In 1999, he relaunched his party with the name of Rashtriya Lok Dal.

== Electoral performances ==
=== Uttar Pradesh Assembly Elections ===
Term	Assembly Election	Seats contested	Seats won	Vote %	Ref
13th Legislative assembly	1996	38	8	1.92%	
