= Rashtriya Lok Dal =

Political party in India

- Abbreviation: RLD
- President: Jayant Chaudhary
- Secretary: Manisha Ahlawat
- General Secretary: Trilok Tyagi (Organization); Chandan Chauhan; Anil Dubey; Yashpal Baghel; Rajkumar Sangwan; Subhash Garg; Abdul Sagir Khan; Malook Nagar; Munshi Rampal; Sukhbir Singh Gathina; Anupam Mishra; Girish K Chaudhary; Rajendra Sharma; Qammer Rabbani Chechi
- Rajya Sabha Leader: Jayant Chaudhary
- Lok Sabha Leader: Rajkumar Sangwan
- Founder: Ajit Singh
- Founded: 1996; 30 years ago
- Split from: Janata Dal
- Preceded by: Lok Dal
- Headquarters: AB 97, Shahjahan Road, New Delhi, 110011
- Student wing: Rashtriya Lokdal Student Wing
- Youth wing: Yuva Rashtriya Lokdal
- Women's wing: Nari Shakti Sangathan
- Peasant's wing: Rashtriya Lokdal Farmer Cell
- Ideology: Secularism; Regionalism; Farmers Rights
- Political position: Centre
- Colours: White and Green
- ECI status: Unrecognised party
- Alliance: National Alliance; National Democratic Alliance (1999-2003) (2009-2011) (2024–present); Former Alliances: United Progressive Alliance (National) (2011–2014); Samajwadi Alliance (Uttar Pradesh) (2003-2007) (2018-2024)
- Seats in Rajya Sabha: 1 / 245
- Seats in Lok Sabha: 2 / 543
- Seats in State Legislative Assemblies: List 1 / 100 (Uttar Pradesh Legislative Council) 9 / 403 (Uttar Pradesh Legislative Assembly) 1 / 200 (Rajasthan Legislative Assembly)
- Number of states and union territories in government: 2 / 31

Election symbol
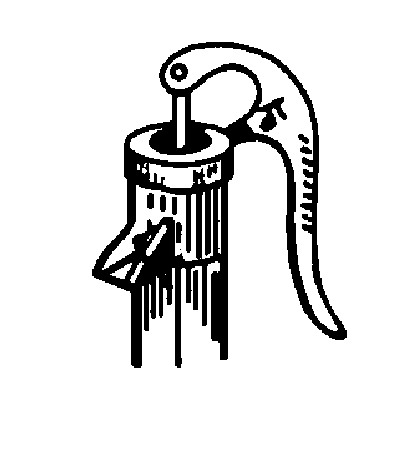

Party flag
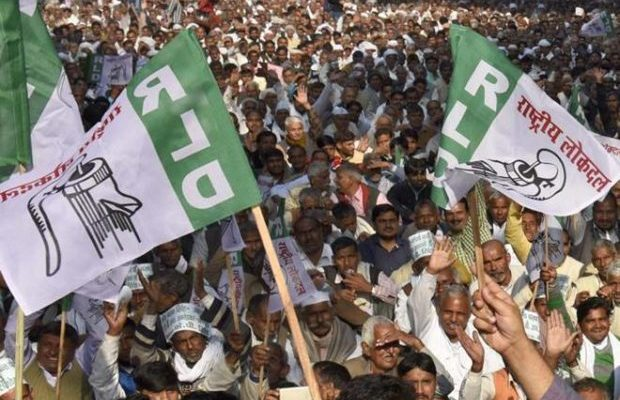

Website
- www.rashtriyalokdal.com

The Rashtriya Lok Dal (abbr. RLD, lit. 'National People's Party') is an Indian regional political party in Uttar Pradesh and Rajasthan. It was founded by Chaudhary Ajit Singh, son of the former prime minister of India, Chaudhary Charan Singh in 1996 as a breakaway faction of the Janata Dal.

== History ==
Ajit Singh was re-elected in 1996 as a Congress candidate but resigned from the party and Lok Sabha. He then founded Bharatiya Kisan Kamgar Party and was re-elected from Baghpat in 1997 by-election.

In 1999, he relaunched his party with the name Rashtriya Lok Dal. While Singh lost the 1998 election and was re-elected in 1999, 2004 and 2009. From 2001 to 2003, he was Minister of Agriculture in Atal Bihari Vajpayee's government. After his party joined the ruling United Progressive Alliance in 2011, he was Minister of Civil Aviation from December 2011 to May 2014. In 2019 Indian general election, he contested from Muzaffarnagar but lost to Sanjeev Balyan of BJP by a very small margin of 6526 votes.

RLD could not make any strong presence from 2014 to 2022, even losing its traditional seats. On the other hand, the party was able to win nine of 33 seats in the 2022 Uttar Pradesh Legislative Assembly election which it contested in alliance with Samajwadi Party in Uttar Pradesh which gave boost to the party life.

In 2024 Indian general election, the party joined the Bharatiya Janata Party led National Democratic Alliance and it won both the seats from which it contested in alliance (Bijnor and Baghpat).

== RLD party office bearers ==
- National President - Jayant Singh
- National Vice President - Dr. Yashveer Singh
- National General Secretary (Organization)- Trilok Tyagi
- National General Secretary-
- K.P. Choudhary
- Abdul Sagir Khan
- Sukhveer Singh Gathina
- Malook Nagar
- Girish Kumar Chaudhary
- Rajendra Sharma
- Munshi Ram
- Chandan Chauhan
- State President, Uttar Pradesh - Ramashish Rai
- Nari Shakti Sangathan (RLD) National President - Manisha Ahlawat
- State President Chatrasabha, Uttar Pradesh - Aman Pandey

== Electoral history ==
Lok Sabha (Lower House)

Term	Indian General Election	Seats contested	Seats won	% of votes
12th Lok Sabha	1998	8	0	-
13th Lok Sabha	1999	7	2	0.37%
14th Lok Sabha	2004	10	3	0.63%
15th Lok Sabha	2009	7	5	0.44%
16th Lok Sabha	2014	8	0	0.13%
17th Lok Sabha	2019	3	0	0.24%
18th Lok Sabha	2024	2	2	0.14%

=== Uttar Pradesh Vidhan Sabha (Lower House) ===
Term	Assembly Election	Seats contested	Seats won	% of votes
13th Legislative assembly	1996	38	8	2.13%
14th Legislative assembly	2002	38	14	2.65%
15th Legislative assembly	2007	254	10	1.95%
16th Legislative assembly	2012	46	9	2.33%
17th legislative assembly	2017	171	1	1.71%
18th Legislative assembly	2022	33	9	2.85%

== Legislative members ==
=== Lok sabha members (MPs) ===
No.	Name	Term in office		Constituency
1	Dr.Rajkumar Sangwan	4 June 2024	Incumbent	Baghpat; Uttar Pradesh
2	Chandan Singh Chauhan	4 June 2024	Incumbent	Bijnor; Uttar Pradesh

=== Rajyasabha members (MPs) ===
No.	Name	Term in office		Constituency
1	Jayant Chaudhary	5 July 2022	Incumbent	Uttar Pradesh

=== Vidhan parishad members (MLCs) ===
No.	Name	Term in office		Constituency	State
1	Yogesh Choudhary	6 May 2024	Incumbent	elected by Legislative assembly member's	Uttar Pradesh

=== Vidhan sabha members (MLAs) ===
No.	Name	Term in office		Constituency	State
1	Dr. Subhash Garg	11 December 2018	Incumbent	Bharatpur	Rajasthan
2	Rajpal Singh Baliyan	10 March 2022	Incumbent	Budhana	Uttar Pradesh
3	Persann Chaudhary	10 March 2022	Incumbent	Shamli	Uttar Pradesh
4	Dr. Ajay Kumar Tomar	10 March 2022	Incumbent	Chhaprauli	Uttar Pradesh
5	Pradeep Chaudhary "Guddu"	10 March 2022	Incumbent	Sadabad	Uttar Pradesh
6	Ghulam Mohammad	10 March 2022	Incumbent	Siwalkhas	Uttar Pradesh
7	Ashraf Ali Khan	10 March 2022	Incumbent	Thana Bhawan	Uttar Pradesh
8	Mithlesh Pal	23 November 2024 (by-election)	Incumbent	Meerapur	Uttar Pradesh
9	Anil Kumar	10 March 2022	Incumbent	Purqazi	Uttar Pradesh
10	Madan Bhaiya	6 November 2022 (by-election)	Incumbent	Khatauli	Uttar Pradesh

== List of ministers in union government ==
No.	Photo	Portfolio	Name (Lifespan)	Assumed office	Left office	Duration	Constituency (House)	Prime Minister	
1		Minister of Agriculture	Chaudhary Ajit Singh (1939–2021)	22 July 2001	24 May 2003	1 year, 306 days	Baghpat (Lok Sabha)	Prime Minister	Atal Bihari Vajpayee
1		Minister of Civil Aviation	Chaudhary Ajit Singh (1939–2021)	18 December 2011	26 May 2014	2 years, 159 days	Baghpat (Lok Sabha)	Manmohan Singh	
2		Minister of Skill Development & Entrepreneurship (MoS I/C)	Jayant Chaudhary (1978–)	10 June 2024	Incumbent	2 years, 72 days	Uttar Pradesh (Rajya Sabha)	Narendra Modi	
2		Minister of Education (MoS)	Jayant Chaudhary (1978–)	10 June 2024	Incumbent	2 years, 72 days	Uttar Pradesh (Rajya Sabha)	Narendra Modi	

== List of ministers in state governments ==
=== 1. Rajasthan ===
No.	Name	Term in office		Portfolio	Chief Minister
1	Subhash Garg	2018	2023	State Minister of Technical Education (I.C.); Ayurveda & Indian Medicines (I.C.); Public Grivences & Redressal (I.C.); Minority Affairs Waqf; Colonisation Agriculture Command Area; Development & Water Utilisation	Ashok Gehlot

=== 2. Uttar Pradesh ===
No.	Name	Term in office		Portfolio	Chief Minister
1	Anil Kumar	2024	Incumbent	Cabinet Minister of Science & Technology	Yogi Adityanath

== State Leadership ==
The Rashtriya Lok Dal has state units in Jharkhand, Delhi, Gujarat, Maharashtra, Punjab, Rajasthan, Uttar Pradesh and other states.

State	State President
Uttar Pradesh	Ramashish Rai
Rajasthan	Joginder Singh Awana
Haryana	Jagjit Singh Sangwan
Delhi	Rajneesh Malik
Jharkhand	D P Lala
Jammu and Kashmir	Dr. Zahoor Ahmad Sheikh
Maharashtra	Sudhir Raut
Gujarat	K. Praveen Singh Jadeja
Uttarakhand	Rajendra Pant

== See also ==
- Rashtriya Janata Dal
- Lok Dal (Charan)
- List of political parties in India
