= Anantram Jaiswal =

Indian politician

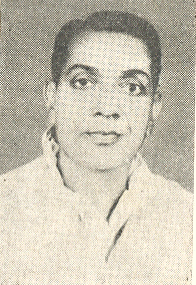

Member of Parliament, 6th Lok Sabha
- In office 1977–1980
- Preceded by: Ram Krishna Sinha
- Succeeded by: Jai Ram Varma
- Constituency: Faizabad Lok Sabha constituency

MLA, Uttar Pradesh Legislative Assembly
- In office 1967–1974
- Constituency: Barabanki

MLC, 4th council
- Constituency: Barabanki

Member of Parliament, Rajya Sabha
- In office 1990–1996

Personal details
- Born: 1 April 1924 Barabanki, United Provinces, British India
- Died: 17 January 2015 (aged 90) Barabanki, Uttar Pradesh, India
- Party: Samyukta Socialist Party Janata Party, Samajwadi Party (Founder)
- Other political affiliations: Socialist Party; Samyukta Socialist Party; Bharatiya Lok Dal
- Spouse: Savitri Jaiswal
- Education: Government Inter College, Faizabad
- Occupation: Politician, lawyer
- Cabinet: Education, Health, Forest

Anantram Jaiswal (1 April 1924 – 17 January 2015) was a freedom fighter and Indian politician was also a Member of Parliament of India. He was a member of the 6th Lok Sabha and was also a member of the Uttar Pradesh Legislative Assembly. Jaiswal represented the Faizabad constituency of Uttar Pradesh now known as Ayodhya. He was also a member of the Member of Parliament, Rajya Sabha, and was also the opposition leader of Janata Party.

== Early life and education ==
Anantram Jaiswal was born in village Chandwara, Barabanki in the state of Uttar Pradesh. He attended the Government Inter College in the city of Faizabad and subsequently attained BA & LL.B degrees. Jaiswal worked as an advocate prior to joining politics.

== Political career ==
Jaiswal joined active politics in the 1950s. Although he was a member of the Janata Party, he was previously associated with three other political parties; viz Socialist Party, Samyukta Socialist Party and Bharatiya Lok Dal. Whilst with Samyukta Socialist Party, he became a member of Uttar Pradesh Legislative Assembly for two terms and was also Leader of Samyukta Socialist Party in the Assembly from 1969 to 1974. Jaiswal joined the Janata Party in the mid-1970s. Jaiswal was a senior leader of Janata Party and also was a Uttar Pradesh State President of Janata Party. He was also a Samajwadi Party Ideologist along with Ram Manohar Lohia and Chandra Shekhar.

Jaiswal held several key posts and was also a Minister & State President in the Government of Uttar Pradesh. He had represented many leaders like Mulayam Singh Yadav.

=== Views ===
During his tenure in the Legislative Assembly, Jaiswal opposed a proposal to establish a commission to prevent communal riots. According to a study of legislative debates, Congress legislator Hamida Habibullah criticized Jaiswal's opposition to the proposal and argued that communalism should be opposed irrespective of religion or caste.

=== Imprisonment ===
Between the 1960s–1970s, Jaiswal was imprisoned five times on various counts. Some grounds of imprisonment were participating in campaigns for removal of statues of British rulers, price rise, for grant of fair wages and clearness allowance to the government servants and teachers, for redistribution of land to the landless etc. In 1975, he was also detained for 19 months for Maintenance of Internal Security Act.

== Posts held ==
#	From	To	Position
01	1967	1969	Member, 04th Assembly of U.P.
02	1967	1969	Education Minister Government of Uttar Pradesh
03	1969	1974	Member, 05th Assembly of U.P.
04	1969	1974	Minister of Health, Government of Uttar Pradesh
06	1977	1980	Member, 06th Lok Sabha
07	1977	1979	Member, Committee on Public Undertakings
08	1980	1983	Director of AIIMS Delhi
09	1990	1996	Member of Rajya Sabha

== See also ==
- 6th Lok Sabha
- Government of India
- Lok Sabha
- Parliament of India
- Politics of India
- Uttar Pradesh Legislative Assembly
- Faizabad (Lok Sabha constituency)
- Janata Party
