= Charan Singh =

Prime Minister of India from 1979 to 1980

Chaudhary Charan Singh
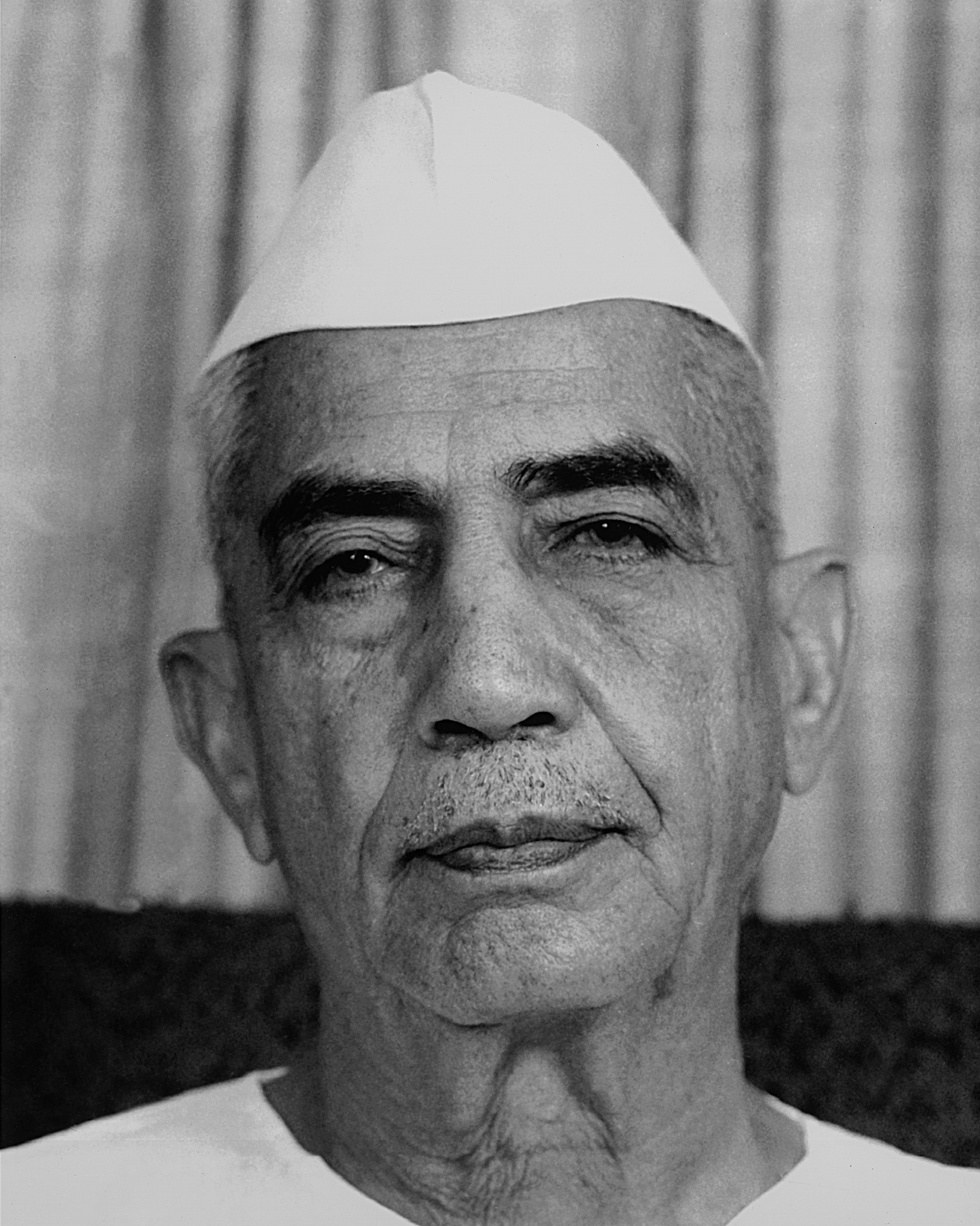
- Official portrait, c. 1979

Prime Minister of India
- In office 28 July 1979 – 14 January 1980
- President: Neelam Sanjiva Reddy
- Vice President: B. D. Jatti; Mohammad Hidayatullah
- Deputy: Yashwantrao Chavan
- Preceded by: Morarji Desai
- Succeeded by: Indira Gandhi

Deputy Prime Minister of India
- In office 24 January 1979 – 16 July 1979 Serving with Jagjivan Ram
- Prime Minister: Morarji Desai
- Preceded by: Morarji Desai
- Succeeded by: Yashwantrao Chavan

Union Minister of Finance
- In office 19 October 1979 – 14 January 1980
- Prime Minister: Himself
- Preceded by: Hemwati Nandan Bahuguna
- Succeeded by: Ramaswamy Venkataraman
- In office 24 January 1979 – 16 July 1979
- Prime Minister: Morarji Desai
- Preceded by: H. M. Patel
- Succeeded by: Hemvati Nandan Bahuguna

Union Minister of Home Affairs
- In office 24 March 1977 – 1 July 1978
- Prime Minister: Morarji Desai
- Preceded by: Kasu Brahmananda Reddy
- Succeeded by: Morarji Desai

Chief Minister of Uttar Pradesh
- In office 18 February 1970 – 1 October 1970
- Governor: Bezawada Gopala Reddy
- Preceded by: Chandra Bhanu Gupta
- Succeeded by: Tribhuvan Narain Singh
- In office 3 April 1967 – 25 February 1968
- Governor: Bishwanath Das; Bezawada Gopala Reddy
- Preceded by: Chandra Bhanu Gupta
- Succeeded by: President's rule

Personal details
- Born: Chaudhary Charan Singh; 23 December 1902 Noorpur, United Provinces of Agra and Oudh, British India (present-day Uttar Pradesh, India)
- Died: 29 May 1987 (aged 84) New Delhi, India
- Party: Lokdal (own party; 1979–1984)
- Other political affiliations: Indian National Congress (before 1967); Bharatiya Kranti Dal (own party; 1967–1974); Bharatiya Lok Dal (own party; 1974–1977); Janata Party (1977–1979); Janata Party (Secular) (1979–1980); Dalit Mazdoor Kisan Party (own party; 1984–1987)
- Spouse: Gayatri Devi (m. 1925)
- Children: 6; including Ajit Singh
- Education: Bachelor of Science (1923), Master of Arts (1925), Bachelor of Laws (1927)
- Alma mater: Agra University
- Nickname: Chaudhary Sahab
- Monuments: Kisan Ghat

Chaudhary Charan Singh (23 December 1902 – 29 May 1987) was an Indian politician, peasant leader, author and an independence activist who briefly served as the prime minister of India from July 1979 to January 1980. Singh was principally known for his land and agricultural reform initiatives, and was Member of Parliament (MP) for Baghpat. During his premiership, he was a member of the Janata Party (Secular). He served as the Chief Minister of Uttar Pradesh as a member of Bharatiya Kranti Dal. He also briefly served as the deputy prime minister of India from January 1979 to July 1979 as a member of the Janata Party. Singh is widely regarded as the "Champion of Farmers", dedicated to advocating for the well being and rights of farmers.

Singh was born in Meerut district, United Provinces of Agra and Oudh. He graduated from Agra College in 1923 with a Bachelor of Science degree, and then pursued Master of Arts in history in 1925. In 1927 he completed his Bachelor of Laws (LLB) from Meerut College.

Singh entered politics during Indian independence movement motivated by Mahatma Gandhi. Singh followed Gandhi in non-violent struggle for independence from the British Government, and was imprisoned several times. In 1930, he was sent to jail for six months by the British for contravention of the salt laws. He was jailed again for one year in November 1940 for individual Satyagraha movement. In August 1942 he was jailed again by the British under Defence of India Rules (DIR) and released in November 1943. He was a Congress member for most of his life, he later founded his own Lok Dal party. He is the first leader outside the Indian National Congress who formed government in northern India and became the chief minister of Uttar Pradesh. He is second deputy prime minister to become prime minister after his predecessor Desai. He was posthumously awarded the Bharat Ratna in 2024.

== Early life and education ==
Singh was born on 23 December 1902 to Mir Singh and Netar Kaur in Nurpur village of Meerut district, United Provinces of Agra and Oudh. His father was a farmer belonging to the Tewatia clan of Jats. Singh started his primary education in Jani Khurd village in Meerut. He did his Matriculation and Intermediate from the Government High School in 1921 and then he went to Agra College to pursue Bachelor of Science in 1923, Masters of Arts in History (British, European and Indian) in 1925. He then did Bachelor of Laws (LLB) from Meerut College in 1927. Singh had knowledge about European and Indian history as well as civil laws of British India as it affected the lives of people living in villages.

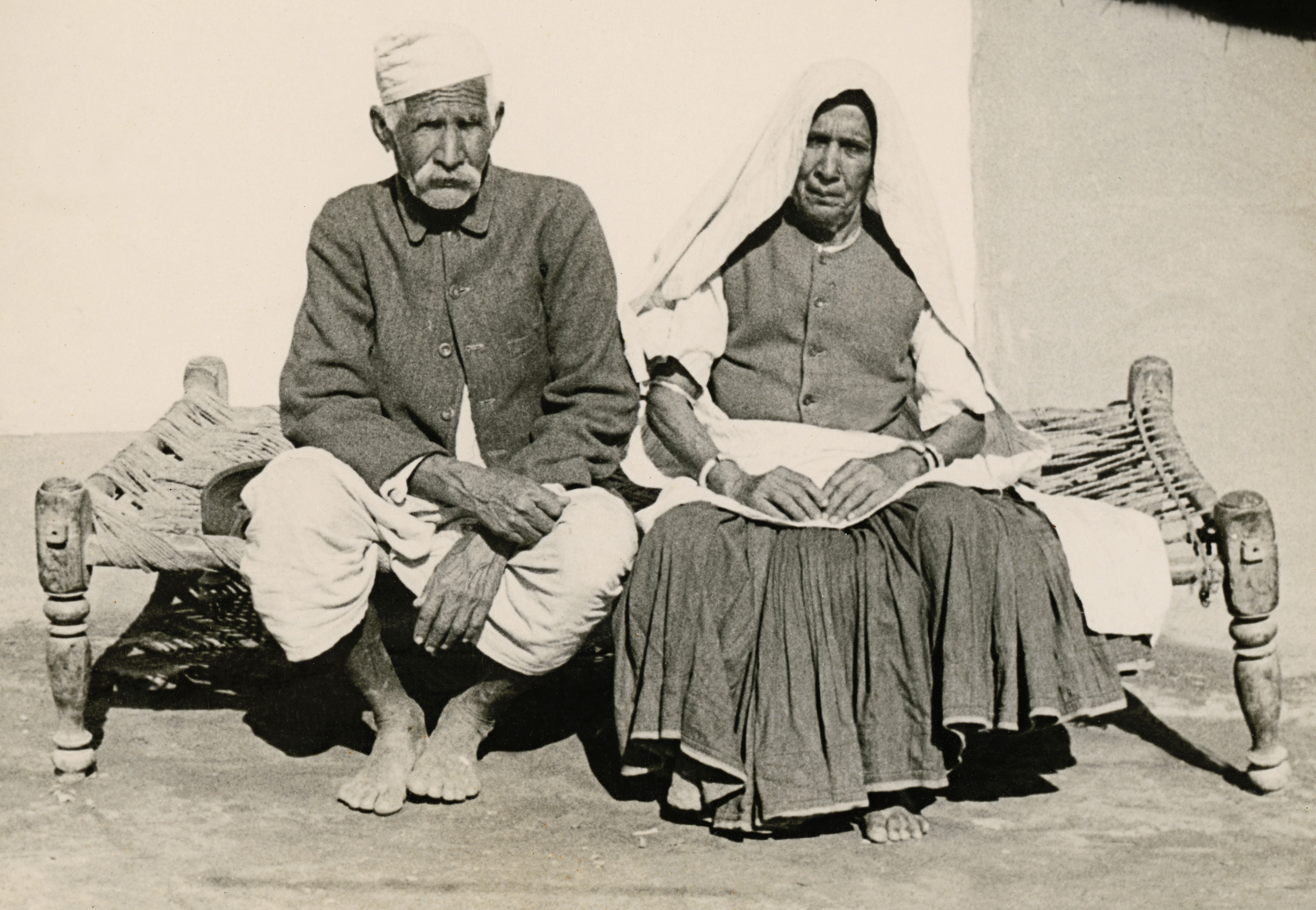
Charan Singh parents, Mir Singh and Netar Kaur in 1955

Singh entered politics as part of the Indian Independence Movement motivated by Mahatma Gandhi. He was active from 1931 in the Ghaziabad District Arya Samaj as well as the Meerut district Indian National Congress for which he was jailed twice by the British. Before independence, as a member of Legislative Assembly of the United Provinces elected in 1937, he took a deep interest in the laws that were detrimental to the village economy and he slowly built his ideological and practical stand against the exploitation of tillers of the land by landlords.

Between 1952 and 1968, he was one of "three principal leaders in Congress state politics." He became particularly notable in Uttar Pradesh from the 1950s for drafting and ensuring the passage of what were then the most revolutionary land reform laws in any state in India under the tutelage of the then Chief Minister Govind Ballabh Pant; first as Parliamentary Secretary and then as Revenue Minister responsible for Land Reforms. He became visible on the national stage from 1959 when he publicly opposed the unquestioned leader and Prime Minister Jawaharlal Nehru's socialistic and collectivist land policies in the Nagpur Congress Session. Though his position in the faction-ridden Uttar Pradesh Congress was weakened, this was a point when the middle peasant communities across castes in North India began looking up to him as their spokesperson and later as their unquestioned leader. Singh stood for tight government spending, enforced consequences for corrupt officers, and advocated a "firm hand in dealing with the demands of government employees for increased wages and dearness allowances." It is also worth noting that within the factional Uttar Pradesh Congress, his ability to articulate his clear policies and values made him stand out from his colleagues. Following this period, Charan Singh defected from the Congress on 1 April 1967, joined the opposition party, and became the first non-Congress chief minister of UP. This was a period when non-Congress governments were a strong force in India from 1967 to 1971.

As leader of the Bharatiya Lok Dal, a major constituent of the Janata coalition, he was disappointed in his ambition to become Prime Minister in 1977 by Jayaprakash Narayan's choice of Morarji Desai.

During 1977 Lok Sabha Elections, the fragmented opposition united a few months before the elections under the Janata Party banner, for which Chaudhary Charan Singh had been struggling almost single-handedly since 1974. It was because of the efforts of Raj Narain that he became Prime Minister in the year 1979 though Raj Narain was Chairman of Janata Party-Secular and assured Charan Singh of elevating him as Prime Minister, the way he helped him to become Chief Minister in the year 1967 in Uttar Pradesh. However, he resigned after just 23 days in office when Indira Gandhi's Congress Party withdrew support to the government. Singh said he resigned because he was not ready to be blackmailed into withdrawing Indira Gandhi's emergency-related court cases. Fresh elections were held six months later. Charan Singh continued to lead the Lok Dal in opposition until his death in 1987.

== Pre-independence India ==
Charan Singh's ancestor was a prominent leader of the Indian Rebellion of 1857, Raja Nahar Singh of Ballabhgarh (in present-day Haryana). Nahar Singh was sent to the gallows in Chandni Chowk, Delhi. In order to escape the oppression from the British Government following their defeat, the Maharaja's followers, including Charan Singh's grandfather moved eastward to district Bulandshahr in Uttar Pradesh.

He received a Master of Arts (MA) degree in 1925 and a law degree in 1926 from Agra University. He started practice as a civil lawyer at Ghaziabad in 1928.

In February 1937 he was elected from the constituency of Chhaprauli (Baghpat) to the Legislative Assembly of the United Provinces at the age of 34. In 1938 he introduced an Agricultural Produce Market Bill in the Assembly which was published in the issues of The Hindustan Times of Delhi dated 31 March 1938. The Bill was intended to safeguard the interests of the farmers against the rapacity of traders. The Bill was adopted by most of the States in India, Punjab being the first state to do so in 1940.

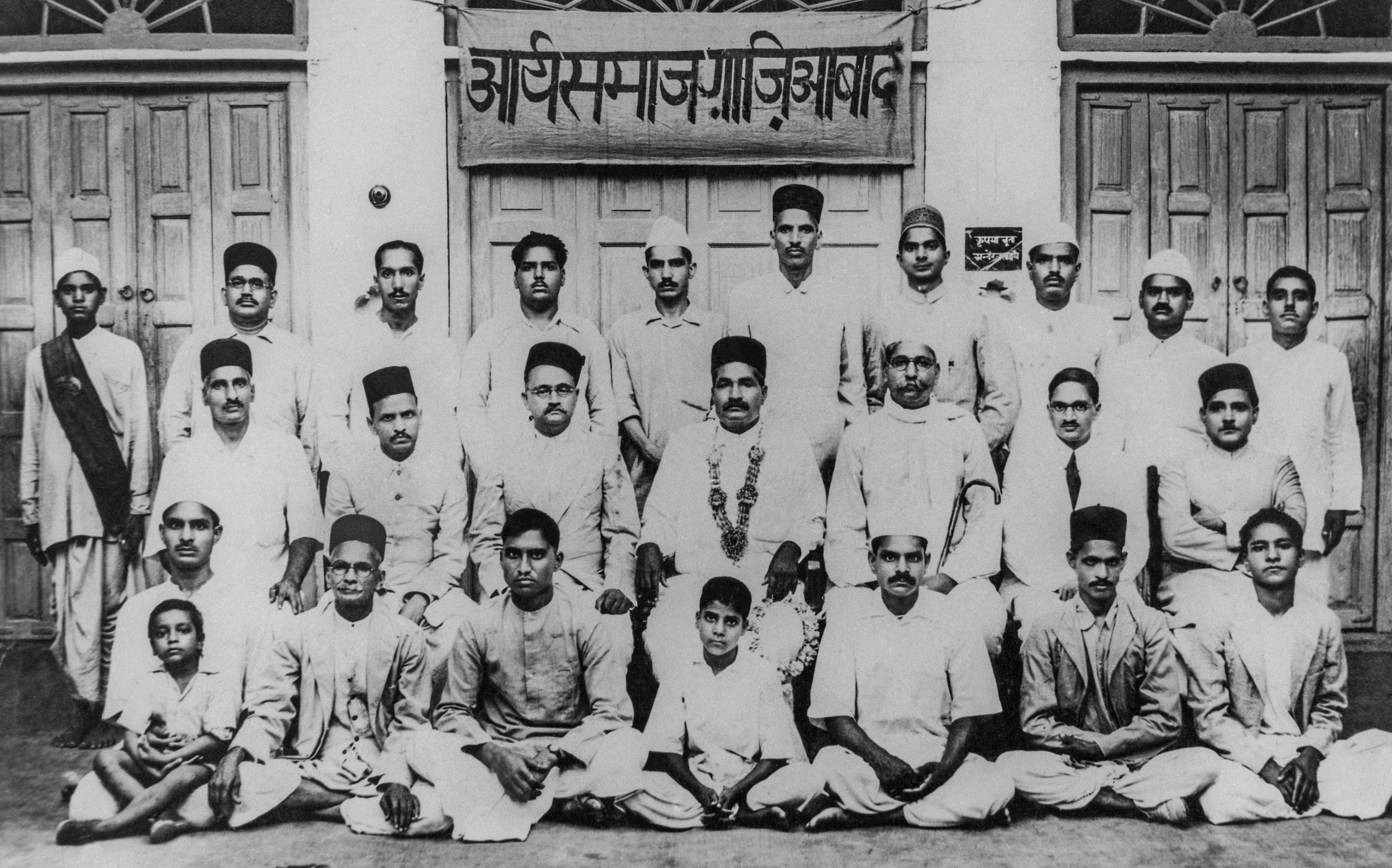
Charan Singh (fifth from left in last row) with members of Arya Samaj in 1930

Charan Singh followed Mahatma Gandhi in non-violent struggle for independence from the British Government, and was imprisoned several times. In 1930, he was sent to jail for 12 years by the British for contravention of the salt laws. He was jailed again for one year in November 1940 for individual Satyagraha movement. In August 1942 he was jailed again by the British under DIR and released in November 1943.

== Independent India ==
Charan Singh opposed Jawaharlal Nehru on his Soviet-style economic reforms. Charan Singh was of the opinion that cooperative farms would not succeed in India. Being a son of a farmer, Charan Singh opined that the right of ownership was important to the farmer in remaining a cultivator. He wanted to preserve and stabilise a system of peasant proprietorship. Charan Singh's political career suffered due to his open criticism of Nehru's economic policy.

Singh is known for piloting pro-farmer legislation such as the Consolidation of Holdings Act of 1953 and the Uttar Pradesh Zamindari and Land Reforms Act, 1952. The latter led to the abolition of zamindari system in the state.He was also strict in dealing with the 'Patwari strike crisis' in 1953. Land reforms resulted in empowering the tillers and providing the landless with ownership of land. It created a conducive atmosphere for the social and economic upliftment of the farmers. During the drought in 1966–1967, Singh offered the agriculturists a much higher procurement price than the prevailing market rates. The infrastructure he laid down led to the Minimum Support Price mechanism.

Charan Singh left the Congress party in 1967, and formed his own political party, Bharatiya Kranti Dal. With the help and support of Raj Narain and Ram Manohar Lohia, he became Chief Minister of Uttar Pradesh in 1967, and later in 1970. In 1975, he was jailed again, but this time by then Indian Prime Minister Indira Gandhi, daughter of his former rival Nehru. She had declared the state of emergency and jailed all her political opponents. In the 1977 general elections, the Indian populace voted her out, and the opposition party, of which Chaudhary Charan Singh was a senior leader came into power. He served as Deputy Prime Minister, Home Minister and Finance minister in the Janata government headed by Morarji Desai.

=== First term as Chief Minister of Uttar Pradesh (1967–1968) ===
Charan Singh for the first time, became Chief Minister of Uttar Pradesh on 3 April 1967 with the help of Samyukta Vidhayak Dal coalition. Samyukta Vidhayak Dal was formed after failure of negotiations between Charan Singh and Chandra Bhanu Gupta on the composition of Gupta's ministry. Singh wanted some of his allies like Jai Ram Varma and Udit Narain Sharma to be included in the cabinet and removal of some of the men from the cabinet. As a result of failure of negotiations, Charan Singh with his 16 MLAs defected from Congress.

Samyukta Vidhayak Dal was coalition formed with the help of non-Congress parties like Bharatiya Jana Sangh, Samyukta Socialist Party, Communist Party of India, Swatantra Party, Praja Socialist Party, Republican Party of India, Communist Party of India (Marxist). Within months of his government formation disputes started to arise in SVD coalition. Samyukta Socialist Party, one of the constituent of this coalition, demanded to completely abolish the land revenue or at least abolish on uneconomic lands but Charan Singh refused to accept this demand as he was worried about the revenue generation and resources. Praja Socialist Party, another constituent in this coalition, demanded for the release of government employees held in preventive detention for their strikes but this demand also Singh refused to accept.

The disputes between Charan Singh and Samyukta Socialist Party became public when SSP decided to launch an agitation of Angrezi Hatao (get rid to English) and during this movement two of its ministers courted arrest. SSP withdrew from coalition on 5 January 1968. On 17 February 1968, Charan Singh submitted his resignation to the governor Bezawada Gopala Reddy and on 25 February 1968, President's rule was imposed on Uttar Pradesh.

=== Second term as Chief Minister of Uttar Pradesh (1970) ===
After the split in Congress party, Chandra Bhanu Gupta resigned as Chief Minister on 10 February 1970. On 18 February 1970, Charan Singh became Chief Minister of Uttar Pradesh for the second time with the help of Indira Gandhi's Congress (R). After three Rajya Sabha members of Bharatiya Kranti Dal voted against the decision of Indira Gandhi to eliminate the Privy Purse, Kamalapati Tripathi announced the withdrawal of the support of Congress (R) for the Singh's government. Charan Singh demanded the resignation of 14 Congress (R) minister but they refused to resign. On 27 September 1970, governor Bezawada Gopala Reddy accepted the resignation of ministers but also asked Charan Singh to resign.

On 1 October 1970, President's rule was imposed on Uttar Pradesh by V. V. Giri from Kiev, who was on tour there. Just two weeks later with the recalling of the Uttar Pradesh assembly, Tribhuvan Narain Singh was elected the leader of the house and became Chief Minister of Uttar Pradesh with the support of Congress (O), Bharatiya Jana Sangh, Swatantra Party and Samyukta Socialist Party.

=== Minister of Home Affairs (1977–1978) ===
Charan Singh became Cabinet minister in Morarji Desai government and took the office as Minister of Home Affairs on 24 March 1977. As a Home Minister, Charan Singh took the decision to dissolve all the state assemblies which were under Congress rule. He argued that these assemblies no longer represent the will of the electorate of their respective states. Charan Singh wrote the letter to nine Chief Ministers to advise their governors to dissolve their state assemblies. Chief Minister of these states went to Supreme Court against this dissolution but the dismissals were validated by Supreme Court.

On 3 October 1977, Charan Singh got Indira Gandhi arrested from her 12 Willingdon Crescent residence. The charges against her were that during 1977 election, she misused her position to get jeeps for election campaigns and another charge was related to contract between the ONGC and the French oil company CFP. But the magistrate before whom she appeared, released her stating that there was no evidence to back up the arrest. By botching up the arrest, Singh prepared his resignation letter but Morarji Desai did not accept it.

On 1 July 1978, Charan Singh resigned from the cabinet of Morarji Desai because of growing differences between them over trial of Indira Gandhi. In December 1978, Singh wanted to undo Janata Party and wanted coalition government in place of Janata Party government. On 24 January 1979, Singh returned into cabinet and held two portfolios of Deputy Prime Minister and Minister of Finance.

== Prime Minister of India (1979–1980) ==
Following the Janata Party victory in the 1977 general election, its MPs delegated the selection of a prime minister to Jayaprakash Narayan and Acharya Kripalani. Morarji Desai was chosen as the prime minister and subsequently appointed Charan Singh as home minister of India. However, due to disagreements with Desai, Singh was asked to resign on 1 July 1978. He was later reinstated as deputy prime minister with finance ministry on 24 January 1979. By 1979, the Janata Party faced internal divisions, particularly over the dual loyalties of some members to both the party and the Rashtriya Swayamsevak Sangh (RSS).

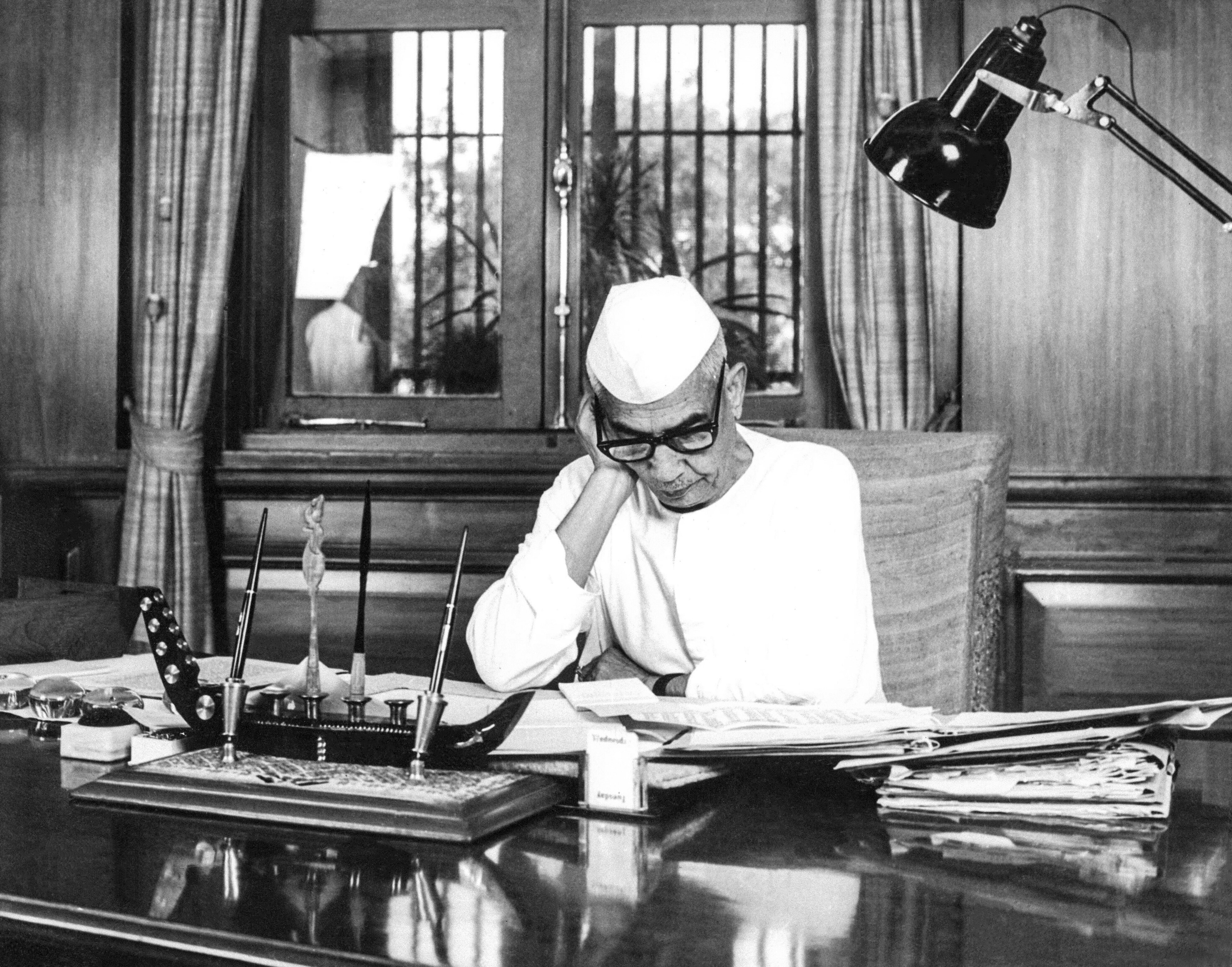
Charan Singh as Prime Minister of India

Singh, who had previously ordered the arrests of Indira Gandhi and Sanjay Gandhi as union home minister, capitalised on the growing discord by seeking the support of Indira Gandhi's Congress (I) party. Following significant defections from the Janata Party to Singh's faction, Morarji Desai resigned as prime minister in July 1979. Subsequently, president Neelam Sanjiva Reddy appointed Singh as prime minister after Indira Gandhi and Sanjay Gandhi assured him of external support from Congress (I) under certain conditions. Singh was sworn in as prime minister on 28 July 1979, with Yeshwantrao Chavan of the Congress (U) party serving as deputy prime minister.

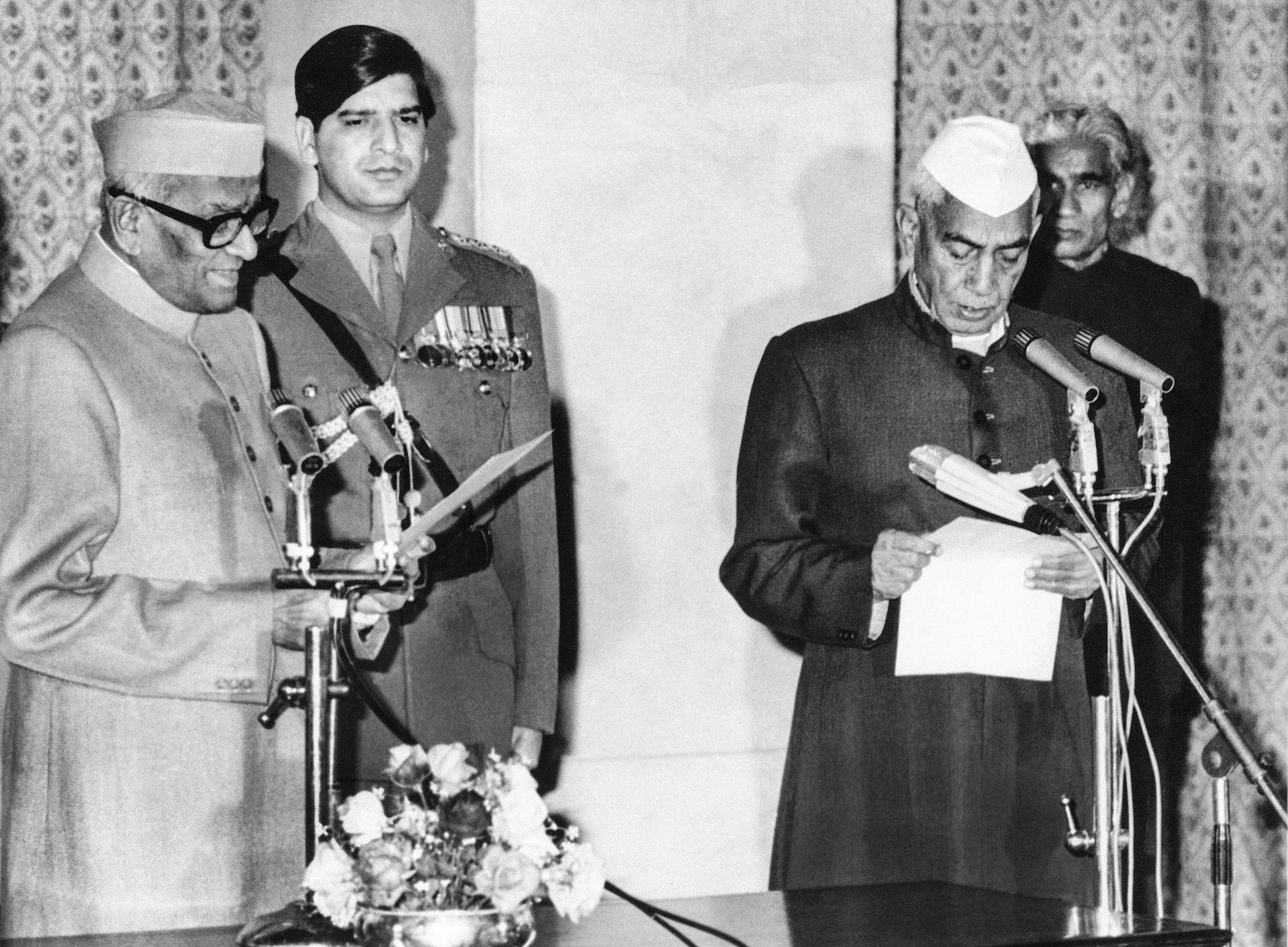
President Neelam Sanjeeva Reddy swearing in Singh as PM

Singh's tenure as prime minister was short-lived. On 15 August 1979, he hoisted the national flag at the Red Fort on Independence Day, making history with his address to the nation. In his speech, he emphasised the importance of integrity, stating:

‘To be able to achieve noble objectives, your means should also be equally noble…A country where people are corrupt, will never be able to progress whosoever may be the leader of the party or whatever be the sound programme he might follow.’

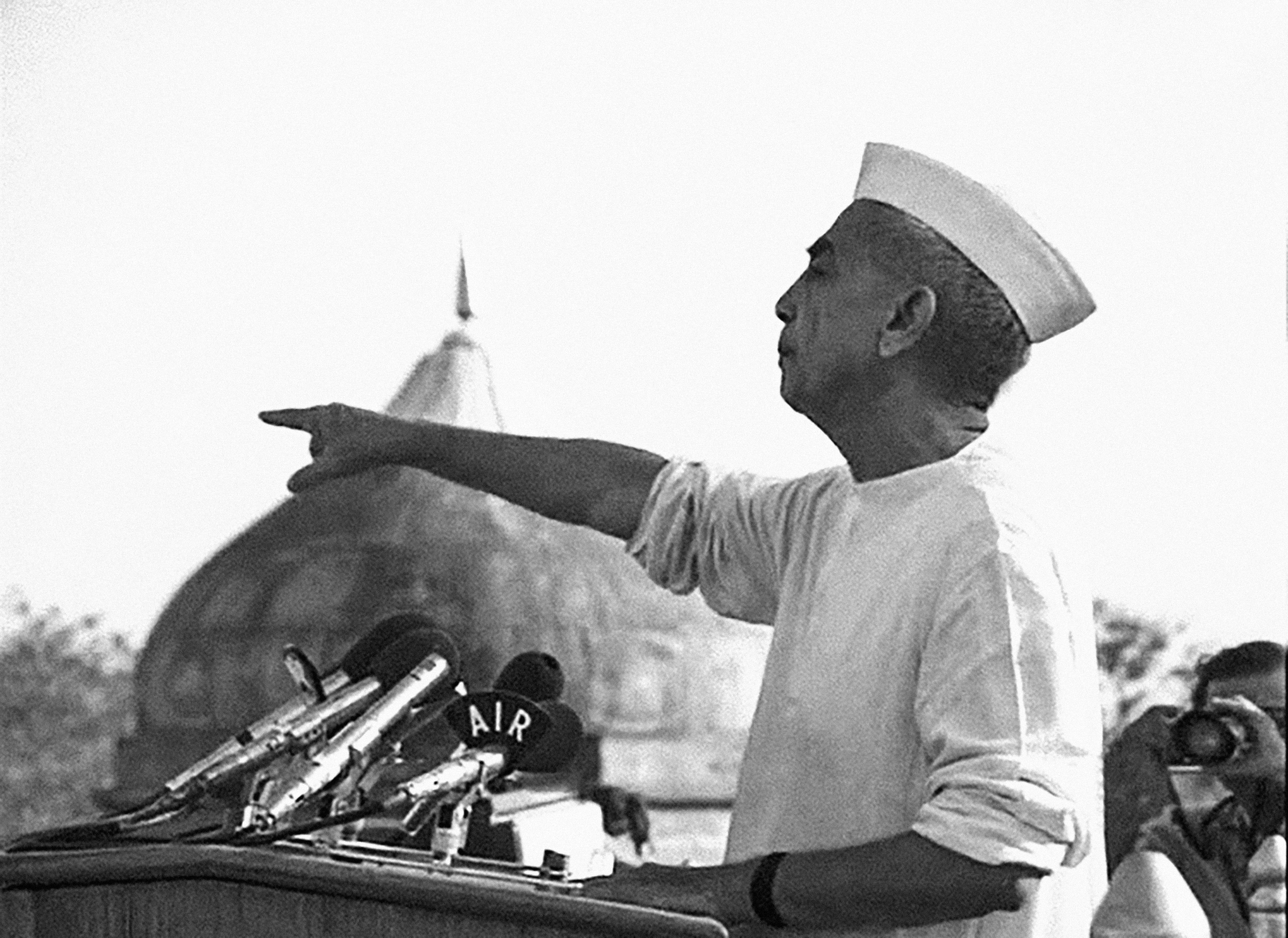
Prime Minister Charan Singh addresses nation at Red Fort on 15 August 1979

However, Charan Singh government soon faced a major setback. Indira Gandhi's support was conditional upon the withdrawal of all charges against her and Sanjay Gandhi. Singh refused to comply, prompting Congress (I) to withdraw its support just before he was scheduled to prove his majority in the Lok Sabha. Consequently, he resigned as prime minister on 20 August 1979, after just 23 days in office, becoming the only Indian prime minister to never face Parliament.

Following his resignation, Singh advised president Reddy to dissolve the Lok Sabha. Janata Party leader Jagjivan Ram contested this move and sought time to gather support, but the dissolution proceeded. Singh remained in office as caretaker prime minister from 21 August 1979 to 14 January 1980, when fresh elections were held.

== Later years ==
On 26 September 1979, he formed Lok Dal by merging Janata Party (Secular), Socialist Party and Orissa Janata Party. He was elected president of Lok Dal and Raj Narain was elected as its working president. In August 1982, a major split occurred in Lok Dal, with one faction of Charan Singh and another consisted of Karpoori Thakur, Madhu Limaye, Biju Patnaik, Devi Lal, George Fernandes and Kumbha Ram Arya.

On 21 October 1984, Singh founded a new party Dalit Mazdoor Kisan Party, by merging Lok Dal, Democratic Socialist Party of Hemwati Nandan Bahuguna, Rashtriya Congress of Ratubhai Adani and some leaders of Janata Party like Devi Lal. Later it changed its name back to the Lok Dal.

== Public image ==
Singh's public image was predominantly that of a dedicated advocate for farmers, earning him the nicknames like "Champion of Farmers" and "Chaudhary Sahab". His efforts in land reforms, such as the UP Zamindari Abolition and Land Reforms Act, 1952, aimed at empowering tillers and providing land ownership to the landless, significantly boosted his reputation among rural communities, particularly in western Uttar Pradesh and made him messiah of farmers. His simple lifestyle and integrity, often highlighted by wearing hand-woven Khadi clothes and was a teetotaler, further enhanced his image as an ethical leader committed to rural development.

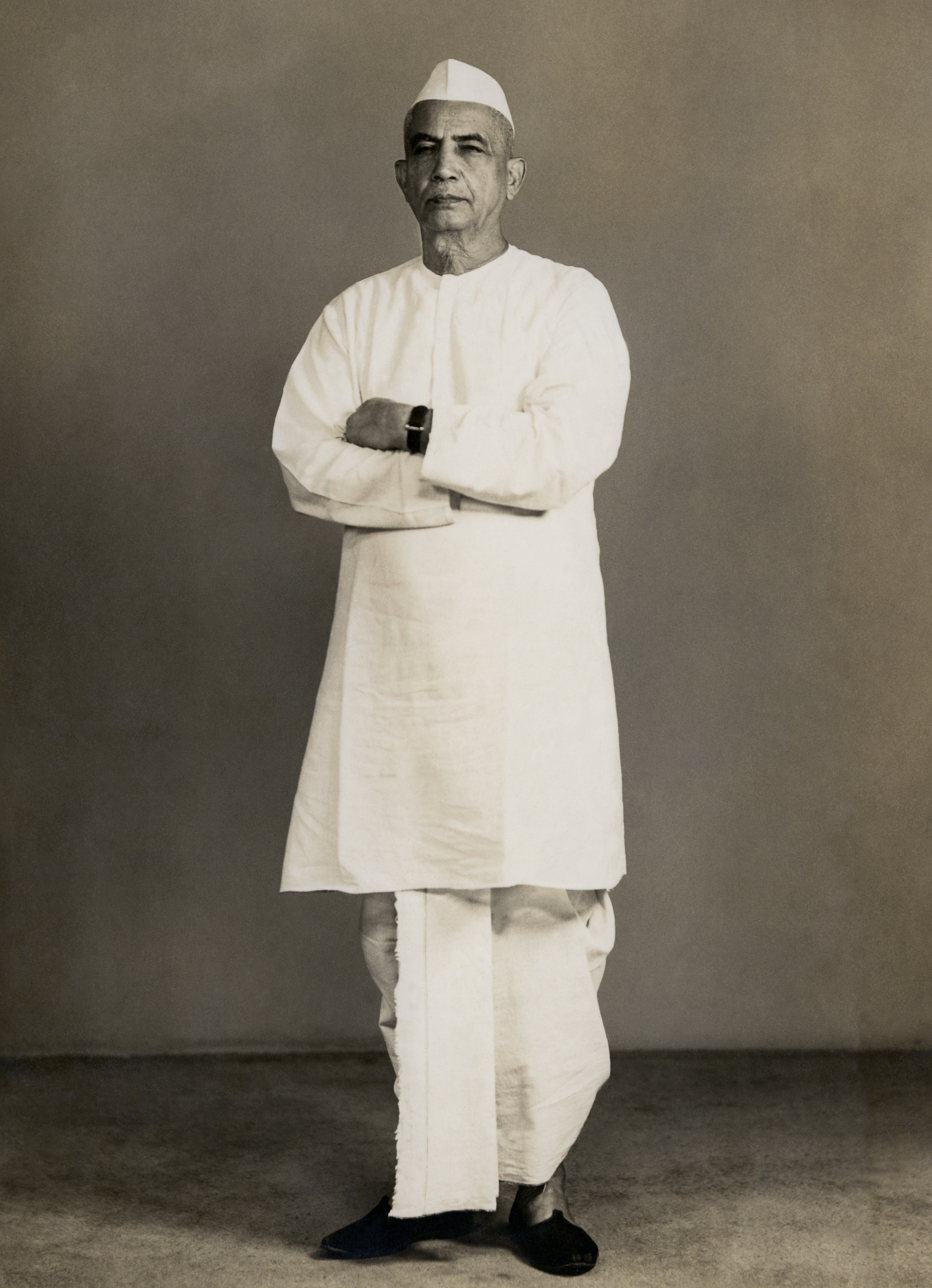
Singh in Khadi made dhoti and kurta

Singh was also noted for his opposition to casteism, advocating for social equality and criticising caste-based discrimination, which resonated with his broader vision of uplifting rural and marginalised groups.

In 2018, BBC wrote that, Chaudhary Charan Singh was more than merely a political figure, a champion of farmers, a leader of a political party, or a past Prime Minister; he embodied an entire philosophy and way of thinking.

In Chaudhuri Charan Singh: An Indian Political Life, Paul Brass, an American political scientist wrote that Singh was a visionary leader committed to rural development and farmer welfare. Brass highlights Singh's legislative achievements, such as the Consolidation of Holdings Act of 1953, Uttar Pradesh Zamindari and Land Reforms Act of 1952, and the introduction of the Minimum Support Price (MSP), which empowered farmers and addressed caste divisions. Singh is depicted as a principled nationalist, advocating for agriculture over industrialisation, though ambitious and entangled in Congress factional politics, notably clashing with Nehru. Brass emphasises Singh's strong support among Jats and backward castes in Uttar Pradesh, his social justice initiatives like inter-caste marriage incentives, and his dedication to public service without personal enrichment. Drawing from Singh's personal files and interviews, Brass presents him as a forward-thinking politician whose policies influenced modern governance.

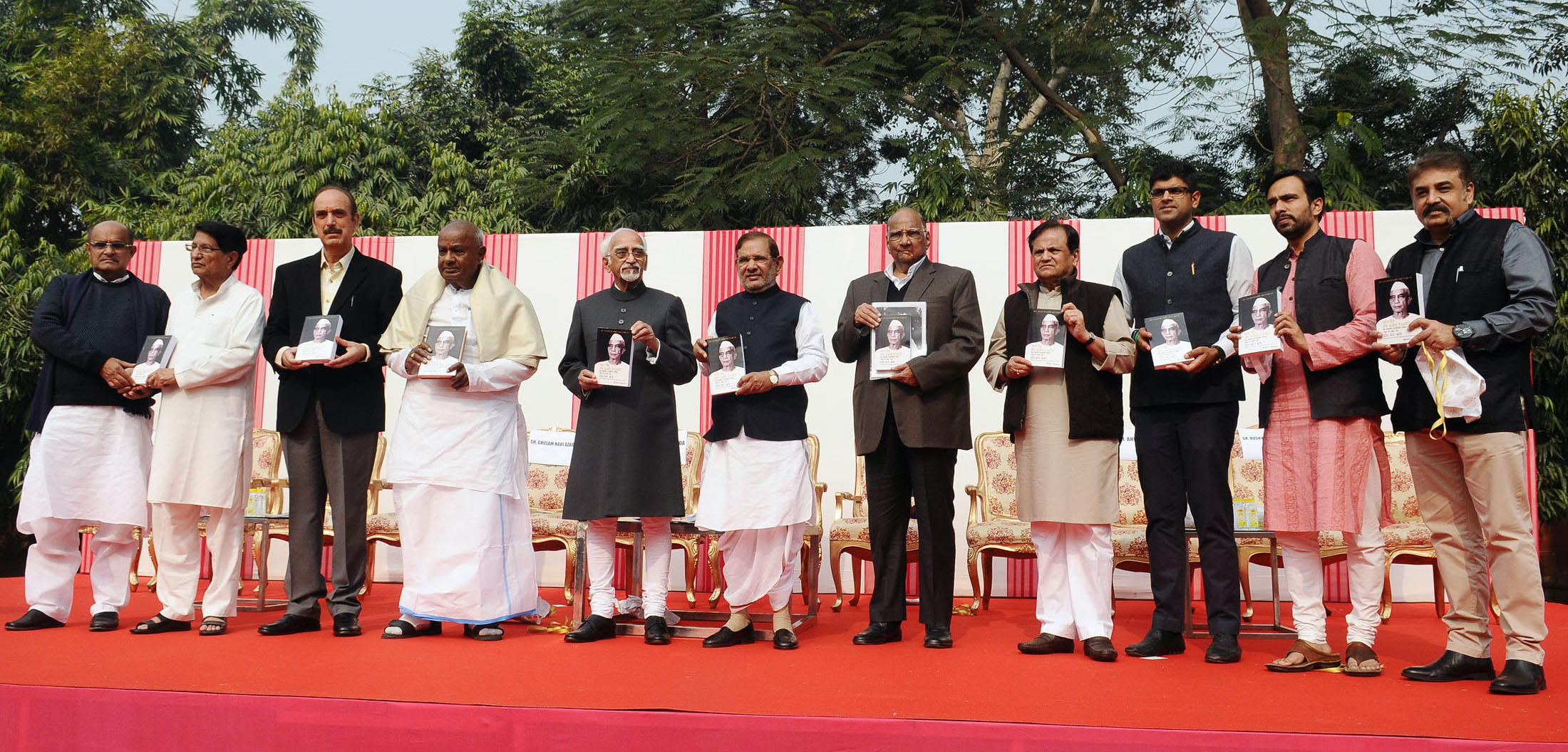
Mohammad Hamid Ansari, then Vice-President of India along with H. D. Deve Gowda, former prime minister of India releasing Hindi transl. of book by Paul Brass on Charan Singh, in New Delhi

Over the years many contemporary and modern politicians have perceptions on Charan Singh. In February 2024, when announcing the Bharat Ratna for Charan Singh, prime minister Narendra Modi praised his contributions. He stated that, "It is the good fortune of our government that former prime minister Chaudhary Charan Singh is being honoured with Bharat Ratna. This honor is dedicated to his incomparable contribution to the country." Modi further elaborated, "He had dedicated his entire life to the rights and welfare of farmers. He also stood firm against the Emergency. His dedication to our farmers and his commitment to democracy during the Emergency is inspiring to the entire nation. R. Venkataraman, then president of India described Singh as "a champion for the cause of India's peasantry" in a posthumous tribute

== Electoral history ==
=== Uttar Pradesh Legislative Assembly elections ===
Year	Constituency	Party	Votes	%	Result	Opponent	Margin
1952	Baghpat West	INC	18,298		Won	Raghubir Singh	8420
1957	Kotana	INC	27,075		Won	Vijaipal Singh	624
1962	Kotana	INC	33,912		Won	Shyam Lal	26,641
1967	Chaprauli	INC	59,199		Won	S. Singh	52,188
1969	Chaprauli	BKD	62,419		Won	Munshi Ram	47,940
1974	Chaprauli	BKD	54,348		Won	Pritam Singh	26,533

=== Lok Sabha elections ===
Year	Constituency	Party	Votes	%	Result	Opponent	Margin
1977	Baghpat	BKD	286,301		Won	Ram Chandra Vikal	121,538
1980	Baghpat	JP(S)	323,077		Won	Ram Chandra Vikal	165,121
1984	Baghpat	LKD	253,463		Won	Mahesh Chand	85,674

== Personal life ==
In 1925, Singh married Gayatri Devi (1905–2002), who later became political leader, serving as an Member of the Uttar Pradesh Legislative Assembly from Iglas (1969) and Gokul (1974) in Uttar Pradesh, and as a Lok Sabha MP from Kairana (1980).

The couple had six children: five daughters - Satyawati, Vedwati, Gyanwati, Sharda, Saroj and one son, Ajit Singh (1939–2021). Ajit, a former IBM employee with degrees from IIT Kharagpur and the Illinois Institute of Technology, entered politics in 1986, later founding the Rashtriya Lok Dal (RLD). He served as a Union Minister and represented Baghpat in the Lok Sabha for seven terms. Ajit married Radhika Singh in 1967, and they had one son and two daughters. He died of COVID-19 in May 2021.

Charan Singh's grandson, Jayant Chaudhary (born 1978), son of Ajit and Radhika, was elected to the 15th Lok Sabha from Mathura in 2009 but lost in 2014 to Hema Malini. He also contested Baghpat in 2014, losing to Satyapal Singh of the BJP. Jayant became RLD president after his father's death and was elected to the Rajya Sabha from Uttar Pradesh in 2022. He is married to Charu Singh, with whom he has two daughters.

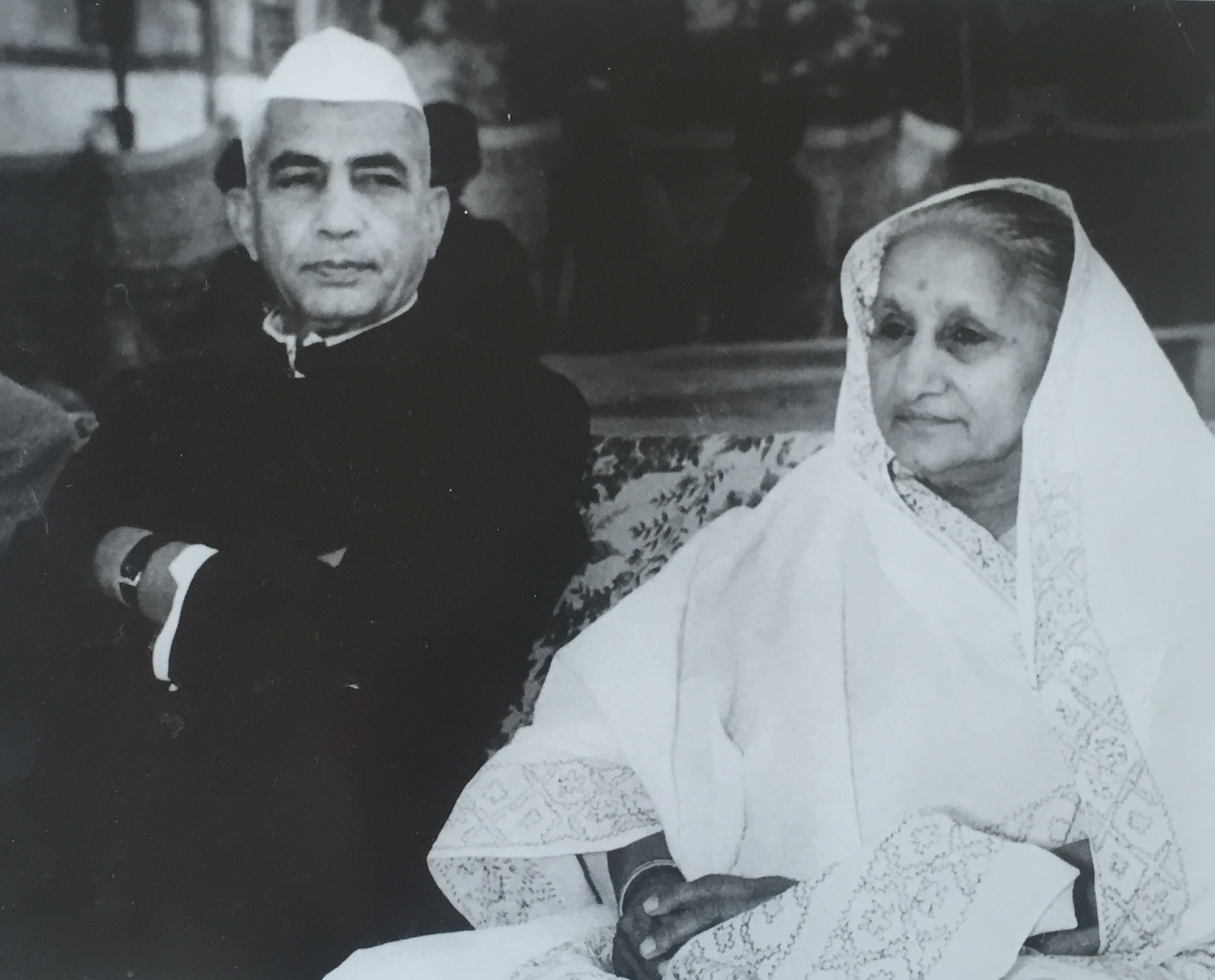
Singh with Gayatri Devi

== Awards and honours ==
- India:
  - Bharat Ratna (9 February 2024, posthumous)

== Death ==
Singh initially suffered a stroke on 29 November 1985. He could not recover from that condition despite being treated at Johns Hopkins Hospital, United States in March 1986. On 28 May 1987, Dr Jai Pal Singh along with other senior doctors from RML Hospital, New Delhi arrived at his residence around 11:35 p.m. (IST), after his respiration was found "unsteady". Singh was then given oxygen support but efforts to revive him failed and was declared dead at 2:35 a.m. (IST) on 29 May 1987, due to "cardiac arrest" at the age of 85.

Following his death, the Government of India announced a four-day mourning and a state funeral. On 31 May 1987, Singh was given a state funeral in Delhi. He was cremated at the Kisan Ghat in Raj Ghat, New Delhi. Many leaders arrived at Singh residence on Tuglaq Road to pay their last respects such as then PM Rajiv Gandhi, Natwar Singh, former president Neelam Sanjeeva Reddy, Bansi Lal, Devi Lal, Ram Niwas Mirdha, N. D. Tiwari.

== Legacy ==
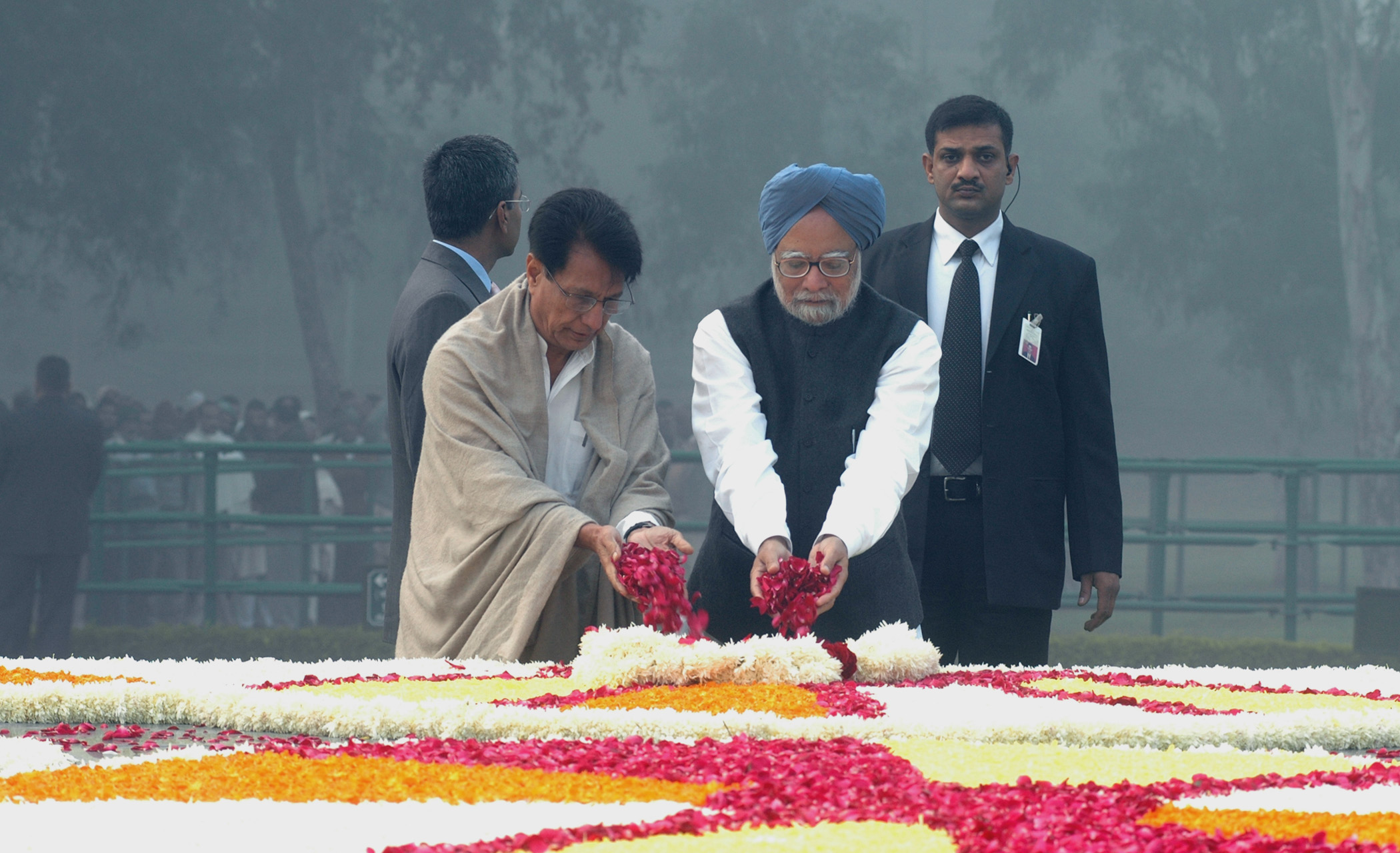
Prime Minister, Dr. Manmohan Singh paying floral tribute to the former Prime Minister, Late Ch. Charan Singh on his 104th birth anniversary at Kisan Ghat in Delhi on 23 December 2006

Singh, hailed by some as the Champion of Farmers, left behind a legacy that is still felt by the agricultural landscape of India. His contributions to the welfare of the farmers and the rural community were profound and multifaceted.

Singh's journey as a stalwart for farmers’ rights began with his instrumental role in piloting pro-farmer legislation such as the Uttar Pradesh Zamindari Abolition and Land Reforms Act of 1950, which aimed to redistribute land from the zamindars to the tillers, and the Consolidation of Holdings Act of 1953, which sought to prevent the fragmentation of agricultural land.

Singh was the chief architect of land reforms in Uttar Pradesh, where he played a pivotal role in the formulation and finalisation of the Debt Redemption Bill 1939. This legislation brought significant relief to rural debtors, easing the burden of debts that had long plagued the agricultural community.

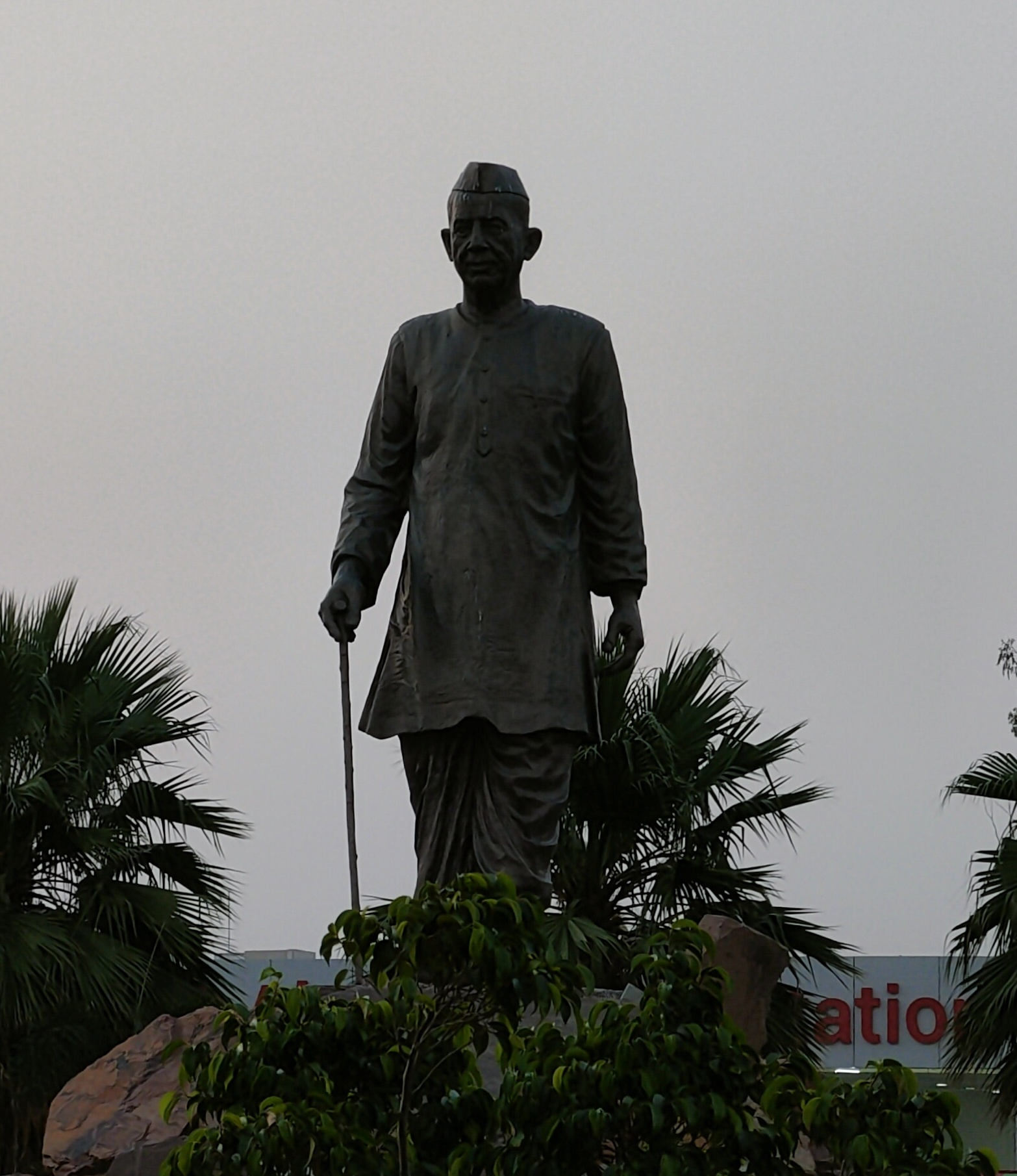
Statue of Charan Singh

As Chief Minister of U.P., Singh was instrumental in enacting the Land Holding Act of 1960. This act aimed at lowering the ceiling on land holdings to make it uniform throughout the state, thereby promoting fairer land distribution and addressing the disparities in land ownership.

Singh's birthday, 23 December, was declared as Kisan Diwas or National Farmers’ Day in 2001. This day is celebrated across India to honor his memory and his unwavering dedication to the agrarian community. To commemorate his second death anniversary, the Government of India issued a postage stamp on 29 May 1990. The stamp symbolises the nation's respect for his contributions as the 5th prime minister of India and a champion of farmers’ rights. His commitment to the agricultural sector were further immortalised with the establishment of Kisan Ghat in 1987 as this memorial in New Delhi serves as a serene place where people pay their respects to the man who was often referred to as the Champion of Farmers.

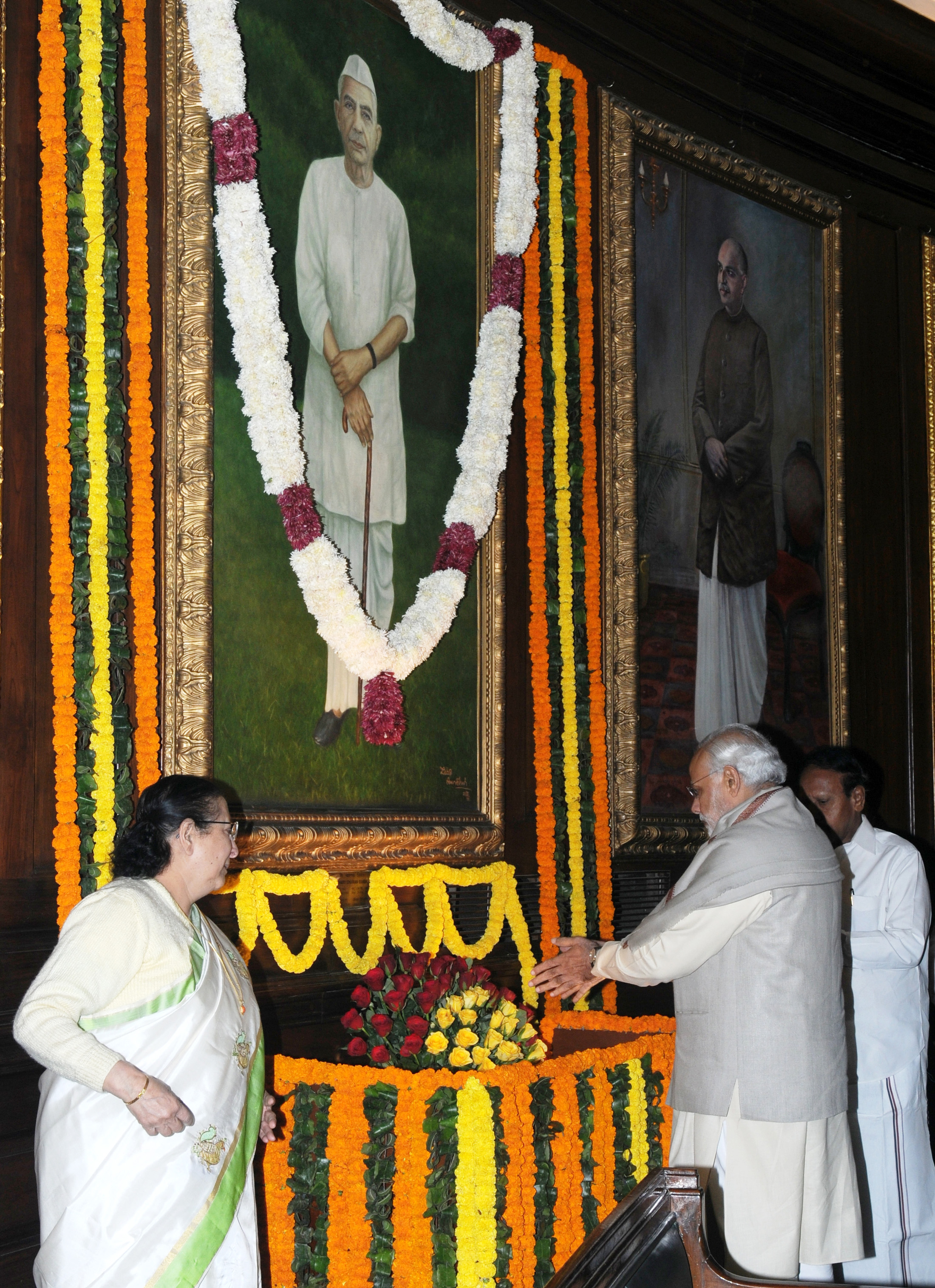
Prime Minister Narendra Modi paying tributes at the portrait of the former Prime Minister, Late Ch. Charan Singh, on his 113th birth anniversary, at Parliament House on 23 December 2015

Several monuments and institutions have been named after Singh to honour his legacy which includes the Chaudhary Charan Singh University in Meerut, Uttar Pradesh, and the Chaudhary Charan Singh International Airport, which was renamed in his honour. On 23 December 2023, a 51-foot statue of Singh was unveiled by Uttar Pradesh Chief Minister Yogi Adityanath in Bilari, Moradabad district coinciding Singh's birth anniversary.

On 30 March 2024, Singh was posthumously honoured with the Bharat Ratna, India's highest civilian award by President Droupadi Murmu, for his exceptional service and contributions to the agricultural sector, particularly in Uttar Pradesh. Singh's multifaceted personality encompassed roles as a patriot, administrator, statesman, and a man of integrity and humanist values.

== In popular culture ==
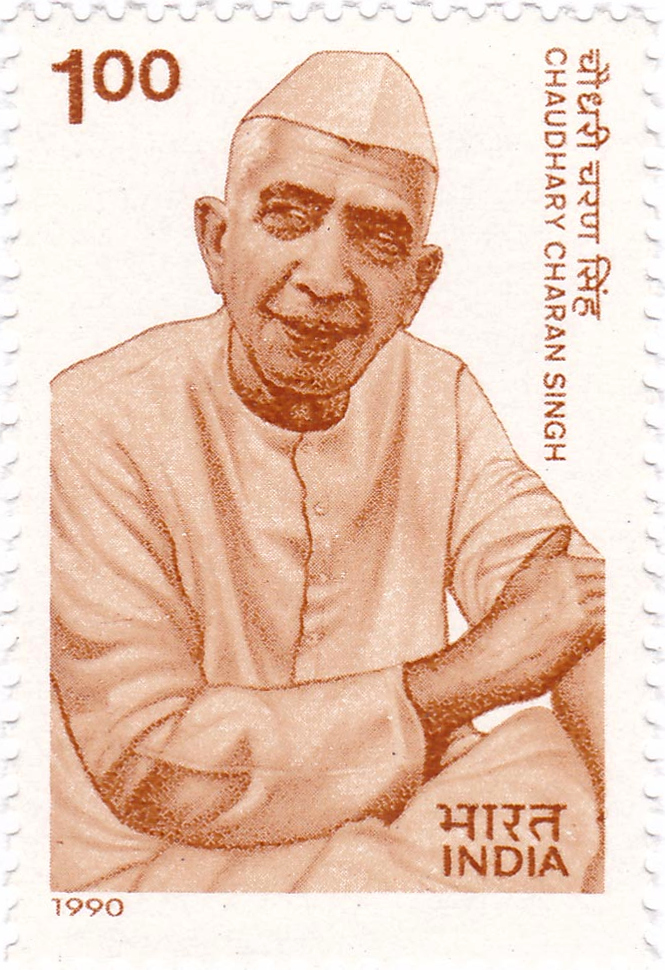
Charan Singh 1990 stamp of India

Kisan Kranti Ke Praneta – Ch. Charan Singh is a 1996 short documentary film directed by Ashok Vazirani and produced by the Films Division of India which covers the life and achievements of the prime minister including his contributions to the Indian agriculture sector. Charan Singh has also been portrayed by Anwar Fatehan in the 2013 television series Pradhanmantri (lit. 'Prime Minister'), which covers the tenures of Indian PMs, by Sundaram in the 2019 film NTR: Mahanayakudu which is based on the life of Indian actor-politician N. T. Rama Rao., and by Govind Namdeo in the 2021 film Main Mulayam Singh Yadav which charts the life of former Uttar Pradesh CM Mulayam Singh Yadav.

== Books ==
- Abolition of Zamindari (1947)
- Whither Co-operative Farming (1956)
- Agrarian Revolution in Uttar Pradesh (1957)
- Joint Farming X-rayed (1959)
- India's Poverty and Its Solution (1964)
- India's Economic Policy – The Gandhian Blueprint (1978)
- Economic Nightmare of India: Its Cause and Cure (1981)
- Land Reforms in UP and the Kulaks (1986)
- Peasant Proprietorship or Land to the Workers
- Prevention of Division of Holdings Below a Certain Minimum

== See also ==
- Bharatiya Kisan Union
- Lok Dal
- Chaudhary Charan Singh University
- Chaudhary Charan Singh International Airport
- Janata Dal (Secular)

Political offices
Preceded by Chandra Bhanu Gupta	Chief Minister of Uttar Pradesh; 1967–1968	Succeeded by Chandra Bhanu Gupta
Preceded by Chandra Bhanu Gupta	Chief Minister of Uttar Pradesh; 1970	Succeeded by Tribhuvan Narain Singh
Preceded by Morarji Desai	Deputy Prime Minister of India; 1977–1979; Served alongside: Jagjivan Ram	Succeeded by Yashwantrao Chavan
Preceded by Kasu Brahmananda Reddy	Minister of Home Affairs; 1977–1978	Succeeded by Morarji Desai
Preceded by Haribhai Patel	Minister of Finance; 1979	Succeeded by Hemwati Nandan Bahuguna
Preceded by Morarji Desai	Prime Minister of India; 1979–1980	Succeeded by Indira Gandhi
Preceded by Morarji Desai	Chairperson of the Planning Commission; 1979–1980	Succeeded by Indira Gandhi
