= Dalit Mazdoor Kisan Party =

Indian political party

- Founder: Charan Singh
- Merger of: Charan Singh's Lok Dal, Democratic Socialist Party of Hemwati Nandan Bahuguna, Rashtriya Congress of Ratubhai Adani and some members of Janata Party like Devi Lal
- Political position: Right-wing
- Colours: Blue

Dalit Mazdoor Kisan Party (Dalit Worker Peasant Party) was an Indian political party founded in 1984 by the remains of the Lok Dal. The DMKP was mainly based in Uttar Pradesh. It was led by former Prime Minister Charan Singh. It was founded on 21 October 1984. It was merger of Charan Singh's Lok Dal, Democratic Socialist Party of Hemwati Nandan Bahuguna, Rashtriya Congress of Ratubhai Adani and some members of Janata Party like Devi Lal. Later it changed its name to the Lok Dal.

In the 1984 Lok Sabha election, DMKP contested on 168 seats and won 3 seats.

== Prominent members ==
- Charan Singh, founder of Dalit Mazdoor Kisan Party.
- Hemwati Nandan Bahuguna, was president of campaign committee for the 1984 general election.
- Karpoori Thakur.
- Devi Lal.
- Mulayam Singh Yadav, was Uttar Pradesh president of party unit.
- Phagu Chauhan.
- Kumbha Ram Arya.
- Savita Ambedkar, was DMKP's candidate for Raebareli Lok Sabha constituency.
