= Lokdal =

- President: Chaudhary Sunil Singh
- Founder: Charan Singh
- Founded: 1979
- Merger of: Janata Party (Secular); Socialist Party (Limaye); Odissa Janata Party
- Succeeded by: Rashtriya Lok Dal (A & B); Janta Dal
- Headquarters: Central Office, 8, Mall Avenue, Lucknow, Uttar Pradesh
- Ideology: Social democracy Secularism
- Political position: Centre-left
- ECI status: Registered Unrecognised Political Party

Website
- lokdal.in

Lokdal or Lok Dal is an Indian political party based on agriculture policies, founded by former prime minister Charan Singh. It was founded on 26 September 1979 by merging Janata Party (Secular), Socialist Party (Limaye) and Orissa Janata Party. Charan Singh was elected president of Lok Dal and Raj Narain its working president.

In August 1982, a major split occurred in Lok Dal, with one faction led by Charan Singh and another consisting of Karpoori Thakur, Madhu Limaye, Biju Patnaik, Devi Lal, George Fernandes, and Kumbha Ram Arya. The rebels were upset because of Charan Singh's dissociation with the coordination committee set up to facilitate the merger of the Lok Dal, Janata Party and Congress (Secular). Later, in January 1983, Lok Dal led by Karpoori Thakur merged into Janata Party.

On 21 October 1984, Lok Dal, Democratic Socialist Party of Hemwati Nandan Bahuguna, Rashtriya Congress of Ratubhai Adani, and some leaders of Janata Party including Devi Lal merged and formed Dalit Mazdoor Kisan Party. Later it changed its name back to the Lok Dal.

In February 1987, Lok Dal was split into two factions, Lok Dal (A) of Ajit Singh and Lok Dal (B) of Hemwati Nandan Bahuguna. Ajit Singh removed Mulayam Singh Yadav, who was Lok Dal's leader in UP Legislative Assembly and made Satyapal Singh Yadav Lok Dal's leader.

In May 1988, Ajit Singh merged Lok Dal into Janata Party and became president of Janata Party.

== Prominent members ==
- Charan Singh, founder of Lok Dal and former Prime Minister of India.
- Biju Patnaik, former Chief Minister of Odisha.
- Devi Lal, former Deputy Prime Minister of India.
- Kumbha Ram Arya.
- Karpoori Thakur.
- Madhu Limaye.
- Hemwati Nandan Bahuguna, former Chief Minister of Uttar Pradesh and worked as acting-president of Lok Dal between 1986 – 1987.
- Ajit Singh.
- Subramanian Swamy, was in Lok Dal between 1984 – 1988 and served as general secretary of Lok Dal.
- Satya Prakash Malaviya, was general secretary of Lok Dal.
- Ram Vilas Paswan, was general secretary of Lok Dal.
- Sharad Yadav, was general secretary of Lok Dal.
- Mulayam Singh Yadav, was Lok Dal's leader in Uttar Pradesh Legislative Assembly.
- Satya Pal Malik, was general secretary of Lok Dal.
- Khurshid Ahmed, Member of Parliament of Faridabad from Lok Dal.
- K. C. Tyagi

== See also ==
- Girraj Kishore Mahaur, former MLA of Lok Dal
- Lok Dal (Charan)
- Rashtriya Lok Dal
