= Prime Minister Singh =

Prime Minister Singh may refer to:

- Charan Singh, 5th Prime Minister of India from 1979 to 1980
- V. P. Singh, 7th Prime Minister of India from 1989 to 1990
- Manmohan Singh, 13th Prime Minister of India from 2004 to 2014
