= Samyukta Socialist Party =

Defunct political party in India

- President: Anantram Jaiswal
- General Secretary: George Fernandes
- Founder: Anantram Jaiswal; George Fernandes
- Founded: 1964
- Dissolved: 1974
- Split from: Praja Socialist Party
- Merged into: Bharatiya Lok Dal
- Ideology: Socialism
- Political position: Left-wing

Election symbol
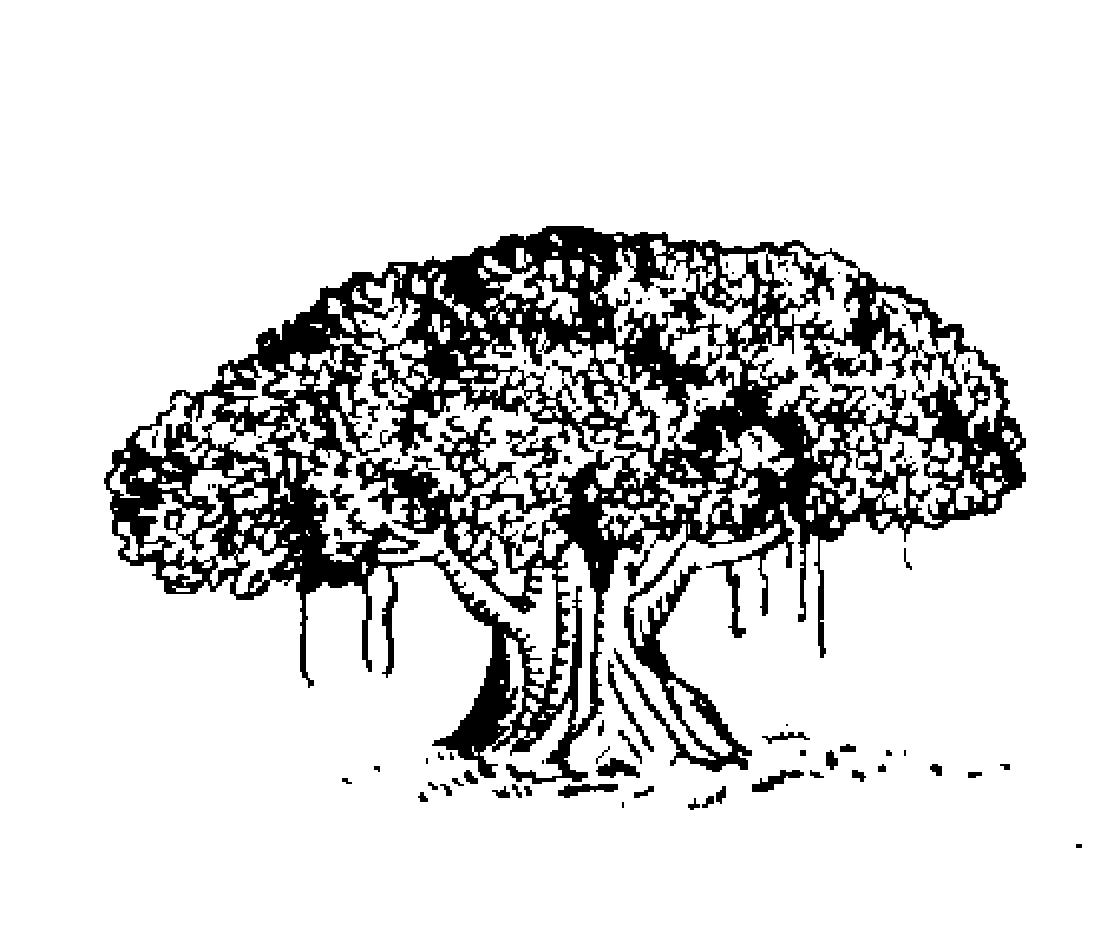

Samyukta Socialist Party (transl. United Socialist Party; abbr. SSP) was a political party in India from 1964 to 1974.

== History ==
SSP was formed through a split in the Praja Socialist Party (PSP) in 1964. In 1965, Ram Manohar Lohia merged his Socialist Party (Lohia) with SSP and contested in 1967 Indian general election. In 1972, SSP was reunited with PSP, forming the Socialist Party. But in December 1972, SSP was recreated after the split in Socialist Party. One faction of SSP led by Madhu Limaye and George Fernandes wanted to merge with PSP but another faction led by Raj Narain resisted the merger with PSP.

George Fernandes was the General Secretary of the SSP from 1969 to 1971 and Anantram Jaiswal its President from 1964 to 1971. The SSP merged with Charan Singh's Bharatiya Kranti Dal, Swatantra Party and Utkal Congress to form Bharatiya Lok Dal.

== See also ==
- List of political parties in India
