= Jai Ram Varma =

Indian politician

Jai Ram Verma
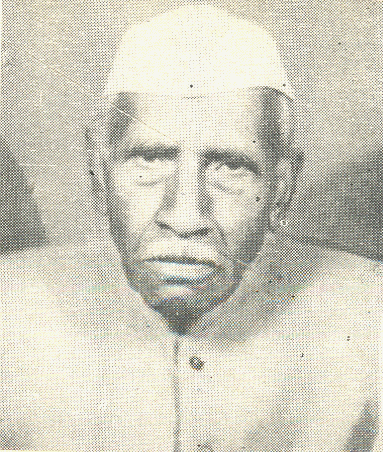

Member of the Lok Sabha
- In office January 1980 – December 1984
- Preceded by: Anantram Jaiswal
- Succeeded by: Nirmal Khatri
- Constituency: Faizabad

Member of the Uttar Pradesh Legislative Assembly
- In office 1970 – March 1974
- In office 1952–1968

Personal details
- Born: 4 February 1904 Faizabad, United Provinces of Agra and Oudh, British India
- Died: 14 January 1987 (aged 82) Lucknow, Uttar Pradesh, India
- Party: Indian National Congress
- Other political affiliations: Bharatiya Kranti Dal (1967–1975)
- Spouse: Pran Devi
- Children: 2
- Education: Government Inter College, Faizabad
- Profession: Teacher, agriculturist, social worker, politician
- Committees: Member of several committees

Jai Ram Verma (4 February 1904 – 14 January 1987) was an Indian freedom fighter, politician and was Member of parliament, Lok Sabha of India. He was a member of the 7th Lok Sabha and was also a member of the Uttar Pradesh Legislative Assembly. Verma represented the Faizabad constituency of Uttar Pradesh and was a member of the Indian National Congress political party.

== Early life and education ==
Jai Ram Verma was born in the village Baragaon, Faizabad in the state of Uttar Pradesh. He attended the Government Inter College in the city of Faizabad. Verma worked as a teacher and agriculturist prior to joining politics. He did his M.Sc. in mathematics from Allahabad University.

== Political career ==
=== Pre independence ===
Varma participated in the Indian independence movement. He was arrested several times (April 1941, August 1942 and February 1945). He participated in the Satyagraha and Quit India Movements. Jai Ram Varma served as a member of Uttar Pradesh Legislative Assembly from 1946 (pre independence) and then went on to be appointed in the first Vidhan Sabha of Uttar Pradesh.

=== Post independence ===
Jai Ram Varma has been in active politics since early 1930s. He joined Congress party. Whilst with Congress, he became a member Uttar Pradesh Legislative Assembly for several terms. He quit the Congress party to join newly formed Bharatiya Kranti Dal in 1967. During his association with Bharatiya Kranti Dal, he again was elected as a member of Uttar Pradesh Legislative Assembly. In 1975, Varma quit Bharatiya Kranti Dal to join Congress (I) once again. Varma held several key party posts and was also a Minister & Deputy Minister in the Government of Uttar Pradesh.

== Posts held ==
#	From	To	Position
01	1952	1957	Member, 01st Assembly of U.P.
02	1957	1962	Member, 02nd Assembly of U.P.
03	1959	1960	Deputy Minister, Government of Uttar Pradesh
04	1962	1967	Member, 03rd Assembly of U.P.
05	1962	1967	Deputy Minister, Government of Uttar Pradesh
06	1967	1968	Member, 04th Assembly of U.P.
07	1967	1968	Minister, Government of Uttar Pradesh
08	1970	1974	Member, 05th Assembly of U.P.
09	1970	1970	Minister, Government of Uttar Pradesh
10	1980	1984	Member, 07th Lok Sabha

== See also ==
- 7th Lok Sabha
- Lok Sabha
- Politics of India
- Parliament of India
- Government of India
- Indian National Congress
- Faizabad (Lok Sabha constituency)
- Uttar Pradesh Legislative Assembly
- List of Indian independence activists
