= Rashtriya Congress =

Indian political party

Rashtriya Congress was an Indian political party founded in December 1982 by Ratubhai Adani and functioned until October 1984. In 1983, Rashtriya Congress joined the United Front alliance, comprising Janata Party, Congress (Secular) and Democratic Socialist Party.

On 21 October 1984, Rashtriya Congress merged into Dalit Mazdoor Kisan Party, a new party formed by merging Rashtriya Congress, Lok Dal, Democratic Socialist Party of Hemwati Nandan Bahuguna and some members of Janata Party like Devi Lal.
