= Chaudhary Sunil Singh =

Indian politician

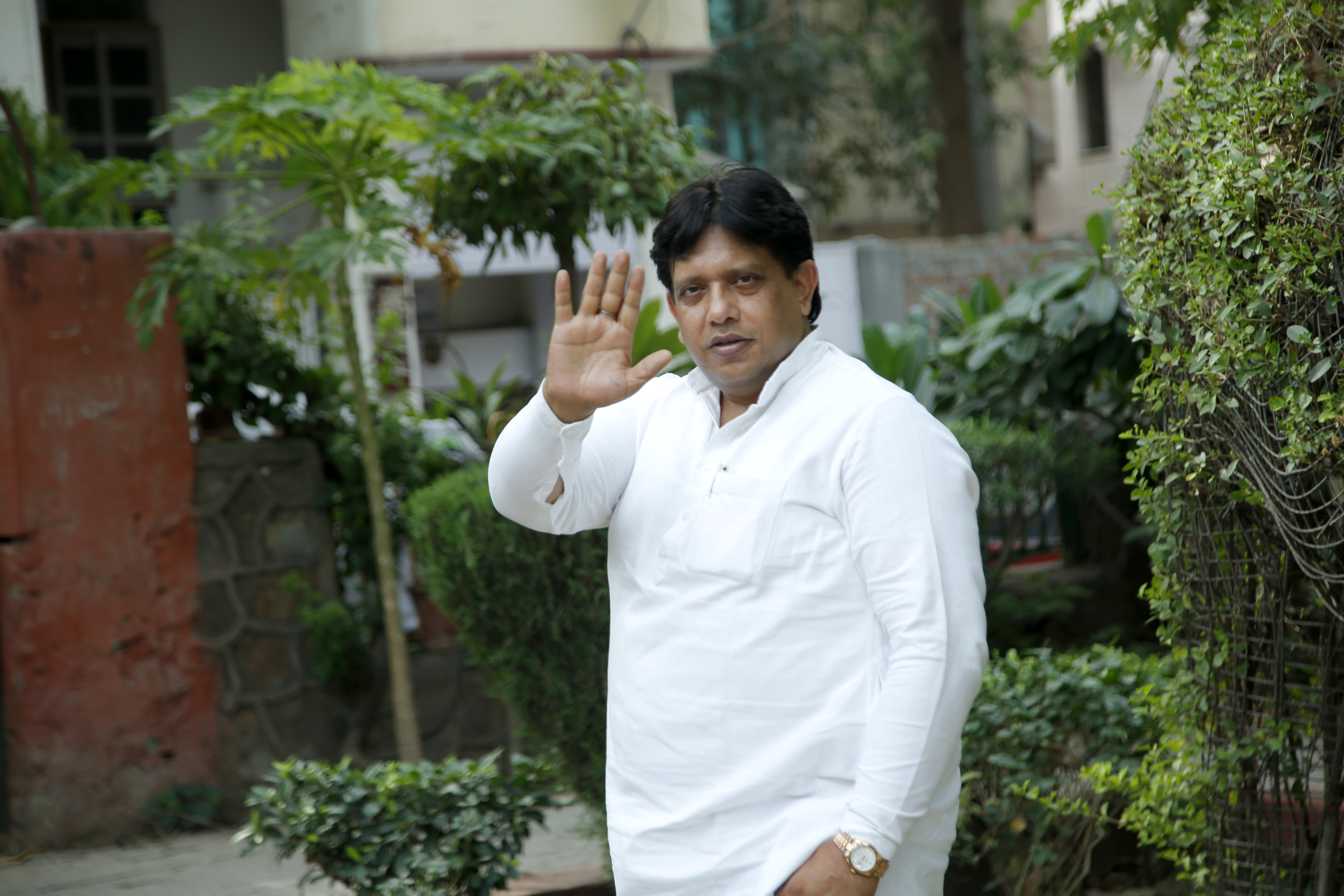

Personal details
- Born: 1 January 1971 (age 55) Aligarh, Uttar Pradesh, India
- Party: Lok Dal
- Spouse: Rachna Singh
- Occupation: Politician
- Website: http://www.lokdal.in

Chaudhary Sunil Singh (born 1 January 1971) is National President of Lok Dal, a political party which was founded by former Prime Minister of India late Charan Singh.

He is former member of Uttar Pradesh Legislative Council.

== Early life and political career ==
Ch. Sunil Singh was born on 1 January 1971 in Aligarh to Rajendra Singh who was a former cabinet minister in Uttar Pradesh and Saroj Singh. He is an engineering graduate and has done Masters in Business Management.

He has also been the Member of Legislative Council in the State of Uttar Pradesh State Assembly. He claims to be carrying on the political legacy of Charan Singh. The party's official electoral symbol is a "Khet Jotata hua Kisan" (a farmer ploughing a field); Singh is concerned about farmers and their wellbeing.

== Support for Sh Mulayam Singh Yadav ==
Ch. Sunil Singh came forward to support Sh Mulayam Singh Yadav when the latter had a dispute in January 2017 with his son and Akhilesh Yadav, former chief minister of Uttar Pradesh.

== Movie production – Game of Ayodhya ==
Ch. Sunil Singh produced a controversial film that portrays a sequence of events during Babri Mosque demolition in Ayodhya. During its release he had to face heavy protests from the right wing.

== Political activities ==
In June 2026, Singh attended a meeting of the INDIA bloc held at the Constitution Club in New Delhi. The meeting was the first formal gathering of the opposition alliance since the 2024 Indian general election and was attended by leaders of several opposition parties to discuss coordination and future political strategy. Singh participated in the meeting as the National President of Lok Dal.

== See also ==
- Election Commission of India
- Lok Dal
