= Bharatiya Lok Dal =

Former political party in India

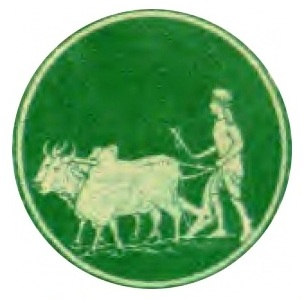
- Founded: 1974
- Dissolved: 1977
- Preceded by: Bharatiya Kranti Dal; Samyukta Socialist Party; Swatantra Party; Utkal Congress
- Merged into: Janata Party
- Ideology: Anti-Indira Gandhi
- Political position: Centre-left

Bharatiya Lok Dal (transl. Indian Peoples' Party) was a political party in India. The BLD, or simply BL, was formed at the end of 1974 through the fusion of seven parties opposed to the rule of Indira Gandhi, including the Swatantra Party, the Samyukta Socialist Party, the Utkal Congress and the Bharatiya Kranti Dal. The leader of the BLD was Charan Singh.

== History ==
In 1977, the BLD combined with the Jan Sangh and the Indian National Congress (Organization) to form the Janata Party. The newly formed Janata Party contested the 1977 elections on the BLD symbol and formed independent India's first government not ruled by the Indian National Congress.

Despite a strong start, the Janata government began to wither as significant ideological and political divisions emerged. Through 1979, support for Morarji Desai had declined considerably due to worsening economic conditions as well as the emergence of allegations of nepotism and corruption involving members of his family. Protesting Desai's leadership, Charan Singh resigned and withdrew the support of his BLD. Desai also lost the support of the secular and socialist politicians in the party, who saw him as favoring the Hindu nationalist BJS. On 19 July 1979 Desai resigned from the government. Dissidents projected Charan Singh as the new prime minister in place of Desai.

President Neelam Sanjiva Reddy appointed Charan Singh as the Prime Minister of a minority government on the strength of 64 MPs, calling upon him to form a new government and prove his majority. The departure of Desai and the BJS had considerably diminished Janata's majority, and numerous Janata MPs refused to support Charan Singh. MPs loyal to Jagjivan Ram withdrew themselves from the Janata party. Former allies such as the DMK, Shiromani Akali Dal and the Communist Party of India (Marxist) had distanced themselves from the Janata party. Desperately seeking enough support for a majority, Charan Singh even sought to negotiate with Congress (I), which refused. After only three weeks in office, Charan Singh resigned. With no other political party in position to establish a majority government, President Reddy dissolved the Parliament and called fresh elections for January 1980.

After 1980 elections, Charan Singh came out of the Janata Alliance with his party and renamed it as Lok Dal.

Subsequently, Ajit Singh (son of Charan Singh) founded the Rashtriya Lok Dal (RLD). Now Lok Dal is led by Chaudhary Sunil Singh of Aligarh.

== Constituent Parties ==
- Bharatiya Kranti Dal
- Swatantra Party
- Samyukta Socialist Party
- Utkal Congress
- Rashtriya Loktantrik Dal
- Kisan Mazdoor Party
- Punjabi Khetibari Zamindari Union
