= Chandwara =

- Village
- Location in Jharkhand, India Chandwara (India)
- Coordinates: 24.391328°N 85.476154°E
- Country: India
- State: Jharkhand
- District: Koderma

Government
  - Type: Gram panchayat

Population (2011)
  - Total: 9,097

Languages (*For language details see Chandwara (community development block)#Language and religion)
  - Official: Hindi, Urdu
- Time zone: UTC+5:30 (IST)
- PIN: 825409
- Telephone/ STD code: 06543
- Vehicle registration: JH 12
- Lok Sabha constituency: Hazaribagh
- Vidhan Sabha constituency: Barhi
- Website: koderma.nic.in

Chandwara is a village and gram panchayat in the Chandwara CD block in the Koderma subdivision of the Koderma district in the Indian state of Jharkhand.

== Geography ==
Cities, towns and locations in Koderma district in North Chotanagpur Division
M: municipality, CT: census town, R: rural/ urban centre, D: dam, P: power plant, T: tourist centre
Owing to space constraints in the small map, the actual locations in a larger map may vary slightly

=== Location ===
Chandwara is located at 24.391328°N 85.476154°E in Jharkhand, India.

=== Overview ===
Koderma district is plateau territory and around 60% of the total area is covered with forests. The first dam of the Damodar Valley Corporation, at Tilaiya, was built across the Barakar River and inaugurated in 1953. Koderma Junction railway station has emerged as an important railway centre in the region. It is a predominantly rural district with only 19.72% urban population.

Note: The map alongside presents some of the notable locations in the district. All places marked in the map are linked in the larger full screen map.

== Demographics ==
According to the 2011 Census of India, Chandwara had a total population of 9,097, of which 4,624 (51%) were males and 4,473 (49%) were females. Population in the age range 0–6 years was 1,698. The total number of literate persons in Chandwara was 5,160 (69.74% of the population over 6 years).

== Civic administration ==
=== Police station ===
Chandwara police station serves Chandwara CD block.

=== CD block HQ ===
Headquarters of Chandwara CD block is at Chandwara village.

== Transport ==
There is a train station nearby at Pipradih on the Koderma-Hazaribagh-Barkakana-Ranchi line.
