= Jani Khurd =

Jani Khurd, Uttar Pradesh Jani
- Jani
- Location in Uttar Pradesh, India Jani Khurd, Uttar Pradesh (India)
- Coordinates: 28.95°N 77.55°E
- Country: India
- State: Uttar Pradesh
- District: Meerut

Government
  - Type: local
  - Body: chairman
  - MLA: Ghulam Mohammed
- Elevation: 223 m (732 ft)

Population (2011)
  - Total: 8,859

Languages
  - Official: Hindi
- Time zone: UTC+5:30 (IST)
- Postal code: 250501
- Vehicle registration: UP-15
- Website: up.gov.in

Jani Khurd is a large village in Meerut Tehsil and district in the Indian State of Uttar Pradesh. It is located on the bank of Ganga Canal. It is 8 km from Meerut City, which is the district city of Jani.

== Geography ==
Jani Khurd is located at 29.85°N 77.55°E. It has an average elevation of 223 metres (732 ft). It falls in the district city of Meerut which is at a distance of 8 km. State roadways buses is the transportation service in this town. It is on the Garhmukteshwar–Meerut–Baghpat–Sonipat State Highway of Uttar Pradesh. Meerut City is the nearest railway station. Second closest district city to Jani Khurd is Baghpat which is at a distance of about 34 km and takes 44 mins to reach there.

== Demographics ==
According to the 2011 census Jani Khurd had a population of 8,859, out of which males were 4,659 and females were 4,200. Jani Khurd has an average literacy rate of 76.82%, Male literacy is 86.21%, and female literacy is 66.59%. In Jani Khurd.

=== Educational facilities ===
Jani Khurd was an Educational hub in the early 1942s. At that time the only Inter College (C.L.M INTER COLLEGE Jani Khurd) of that area. It is situated in Jani Block, Meerut District, Uttar Pradesh State, India.

=== Schools ===
- C.L.M INTER COLLEGE JANI
- M.D.M PUBLIC SCHOOL JANI
- B.K PUBLIC SCHOOL JANI

=== Banks ===
- Punjab National Bank
- State Bank of India
