= Bharatiya Kranti Dal =

- Founder: Charan Singh
- Founded: October 1967
- Succeeded by: Bharatiya Lok Dal
- Political position: Right-wing
- Colours: Green

Election symbol
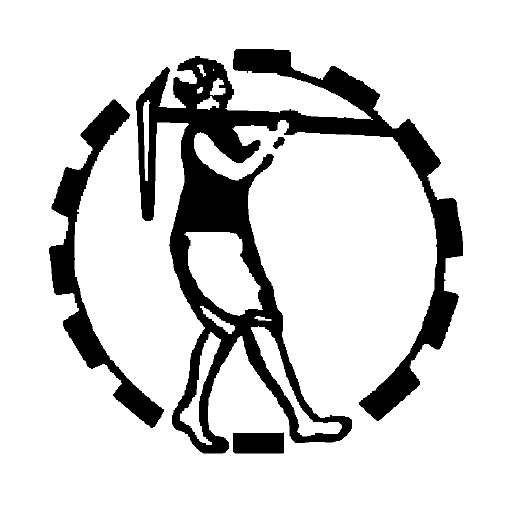

Bharatiya Kranti Dal (lit. 'Indian Revolution Party') was a political party in India, founded by Chaudhary Charan Singh, chief minister of Uttar Pradesh. The party was founded at a meeting in Lucknow in October 1967. After the 1977 general election, the successor party of the BKD, Bharatiya Lok Dal was merged into the Janata Party.

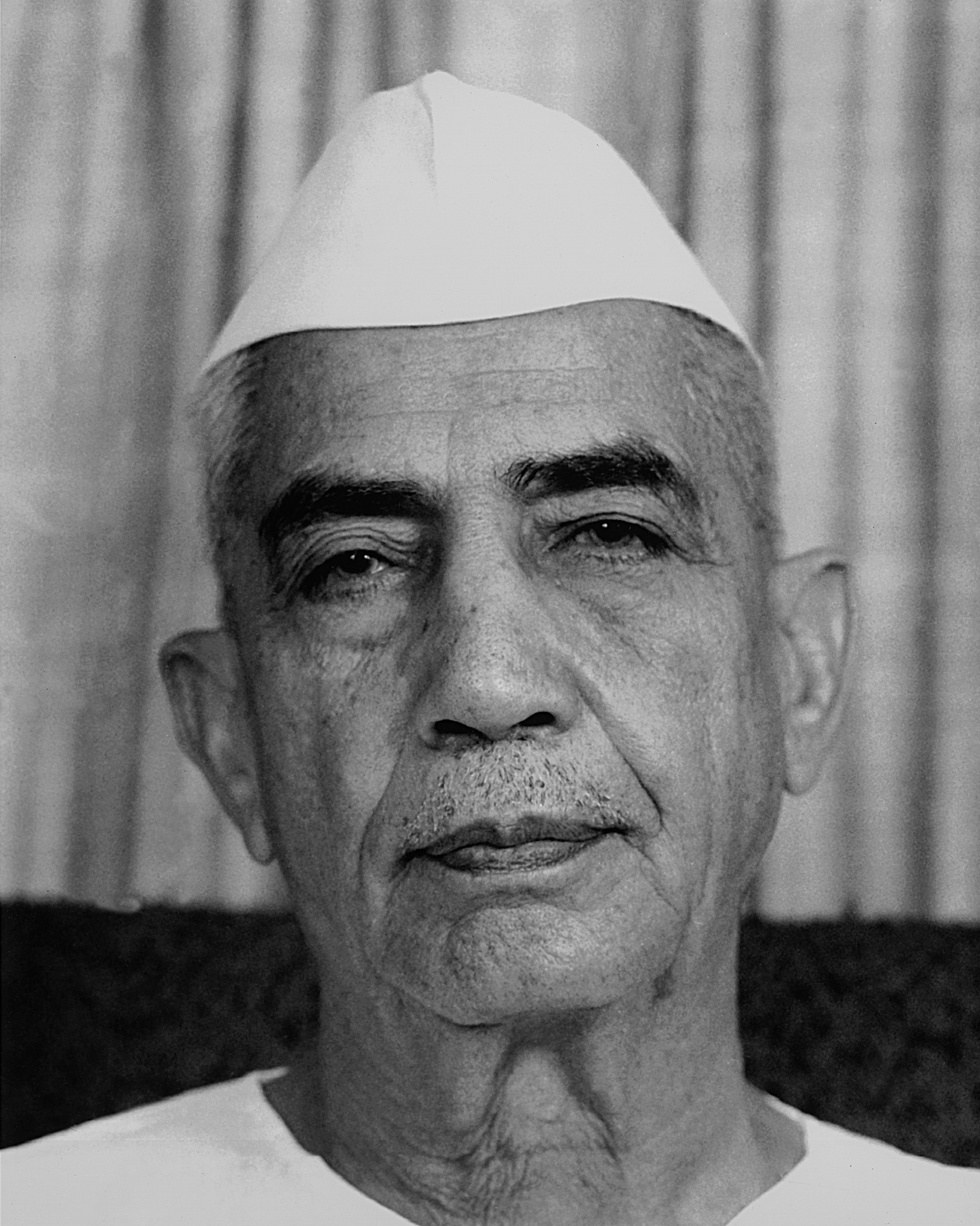
Charan Singh, founder of Bharatiya Kranti Dal

The seeds for the formation of BKD were sown on 9 April 1967, when Humayun Kabir organised a meeting of all non-Congress Chief Ministers of India and other important leaders in Delhi. At Indore session of BKD in November 1967, Mahamaya Prasad Sinha was elected as first chairman of the party.

== List of chief ministers ==
Name	State	Term start	Term end
Charan Singh	Uttar Pradesh	3 April 1967	25 February 1968
Charan Singh	Uttar Pradesh	18 February 1970	1 October 1970

== See also ==
- Indian National Congress breakaway parties
