= Government Inter College Faizabad =

Government Inter College, Ayodhya or GIC-Ayodhya is one of the oldest middle schools of Ayodhya, Uttar Pradesh, India. It was established in 1883.

GIC Ayodhya is governed by Board of High School and Intermediate Education Uttar Pradesh, Prayagraj.

== Awards ==
- Ramesh Chandra, Asstt. Teacher (Science & Maths) was awarded Science Teacher Samman in 2006–2007 by Council of Science & Technology U.P.
- Vishal Chandra was awarded by " Gold Medal " in "Pt. Jawaharlal Nehru State Level Science Exhibition, Allahabad" 2005–2006.
- Vishal Chandra was awarded by " State Child Scientist Award " in 2007–2008 by Council of Science & Technology U.P.

== Notable alumni ==
- Panna Lal (b.1921), politician
- Nirmal Khatri (b. 1951), politician
