= Kumbha Ram Arya =

Member of Parliament, Lok Sabha
- In office 1980–1984
- Constituency: Sikar, Rajasthan

Member of Parliament, Rajya Sabha
- In office 1960–1964
- In office 1969–1974

Personal details
- Born: 10 May 1914 Khaira-Chhota, Patiala, India
- Died: 26 October 1995 (aged 81) Jaipur, India
- Spouse: Bhudevi
- Known for: Land reform and Panchayati Raj in Rajasthan

Kumbha Ram Arya (10 May 1914 – 26 October 1995) was an Indian freedom fighter, parliamentarian, and one of the popular leaders of farmers from Rajasthan, India. He was elected to the 7th Lok Sabha from Sikar. He also served as Member of Rajya Sabha from 1960 to 1964 and then 1969–74 from Rajasthan.

== Career ==
=== Involvement in the Freedom Movement ===
Arya's involvement in the Indian independence movement began in earnest when he participated in the Lahore Congress Adhiveshan in 1930. His participation led to his dismissal from the Forest Department. He then joined the Police Department, where he rose to the rank of Inspector. However, his commitment to the freedom struggle led him to resign from his police position to join the movement full-time.

=== Political career ===
Arya's political career was marked by his dedication to social reform and the upliftment of farmers. He founded the political organisation "Praja Parishad" with the help of democratic-minded politicians Mukta Prasad Vakil and Raghuvar Dayal Goyal. Arya became a prominent leader in the fight against the exploitation of farmers by Jagirdars (landlords) in the princely state of Bikaner.

He was imprisoned by the ruler of Bikaner for his activism but continued to advocate for farmers' rights. His efforts contributed to significant land reforms in Rajasthan, including the Rajasthan Protection of Tenants Ordinance of 1949 and the Rajasthan Land Reforms and Resumption of Jagirs Act of 19522.

=== Parliamentary career ===
Kumbha Ram Arya served as a member of the Rajya Sabha, the upper house of India's Parliament, from 1960 to 1964 and again from 1969 to 1974. He was later elected to the Lok Sabha, the lower house, representing the Sikar constituency from 1980 to 1984.
