= Ratubhai Adani =

Indian politician (1914–1997)

Adani in 1973

Ratubhai Mulshankar Adani (13 April 1914 – 5 September 1997) was an Indian politician and social activist from Gujarat. He served as a member of legislative assemblies of Saurashtra, Bombay and Gujarat as well as minister in cabinets of these states.

== Early life ==
Adani was born on 13 April 1914, in Jasdan or he was born in taravada village of amreli district Gujarat, India). Influenced by Mahatma Gandhi, he participated in Indian independence movement. In 1930, he was imprisoned for two years for participating in the Dholera movement. In 1936, he was involved in social and economic activities in Taravada village near Amreli. He founded the Kathiawad Kranti Dal (Kathiawar Revolution Force) during the 1942 Quit India Movement. Following the independence of India, he served as the Commander-in-Chief of the People's Army of the Arzi Hakumat (provisional government) which was instrumental during the annexation of Junagadh in 1947.

== Political career ==
Adani was elected as a member of constitution assembly of Saurashtra in 1948. He was later elected as a member of legislative assembly of Saurashtra State in 1952 from Keshod constituency and served as a minister in state cabinet. Following merger of Saurashtra with Bombay State, he was a minister of Panchayat, prohibition and cottage industry department. Following establishment of Gujarat in 1960, he served as a minister of public works and labour department. Following the 1962 election, he was a minister of road and public works department under Jivraj Mehta government from 1962 to 1963. During his tenure, Panchayati Raj was established in Gujarat. He later served as a minister of agriculture, forest, cooperatives and Panchayat department under Balwantrai Mehta government from 1963 to 1965.

He was also president of Gujarat state unit of Indian National Congress from 1970 to 1972. He again served as the minister from 1972 to 1974. In 1977, he was responsible for Congress (I) in Gujarat. He voluntarily retired from politics and served in social organisations.

He wrote Dithu Me Gamadu Aa and Satyagrahna Samaranganma Volume I-II.

He died on 5 September 1997, aged 83, in Rajkot.
