= Nakul =

Nakul or Nakula was a Pandava brother, the protagonists of the ancient Indian epic Mahabharata.

Nakul is also an Indian masculine given name and may refer to:

- Nakkhul or Nakul, an Indian film actor and singer
- Nakul Abhyankar, an Indian playback singer
- Nakul Ambilkar or SEQU3L, an Indian DJ
- Nakul Chandra Bhuyan, an Indian historian
- Nakul Das Rai, an Indian politician
- Nakul Dev Mahajan, an Indian-American dancer and choreographer
- Nakul Dubey, an Indian politician
- Nakuul Mehta, an Indian television actor
- Nakul Nath, an Indian politician
- Nakul Nayak, an Indian politician
- Nakul Sharma, an Indian cricketer
- Nakul Shenoy, an Indian magician
- Nakul Singh Sawhney, an Indian filmmaker
- Nakul Vaid, an Indian film actor
- Nakul Verma, an Indian cricketer

== See also ==
- Nakul-class tugboat
- Nakula Sahadeva Ratha, Hindu temple and World Heritage Site in Tamil Nadu, India
- Nakulan or T. K. Doraiswamy, an Indian poet
- Nakulan Citar, disciple of the Indian religious leader Ayya Vaikundar
