= Satyapal Dang =

Indian politician

Padma Bhushan Satyapal Dang
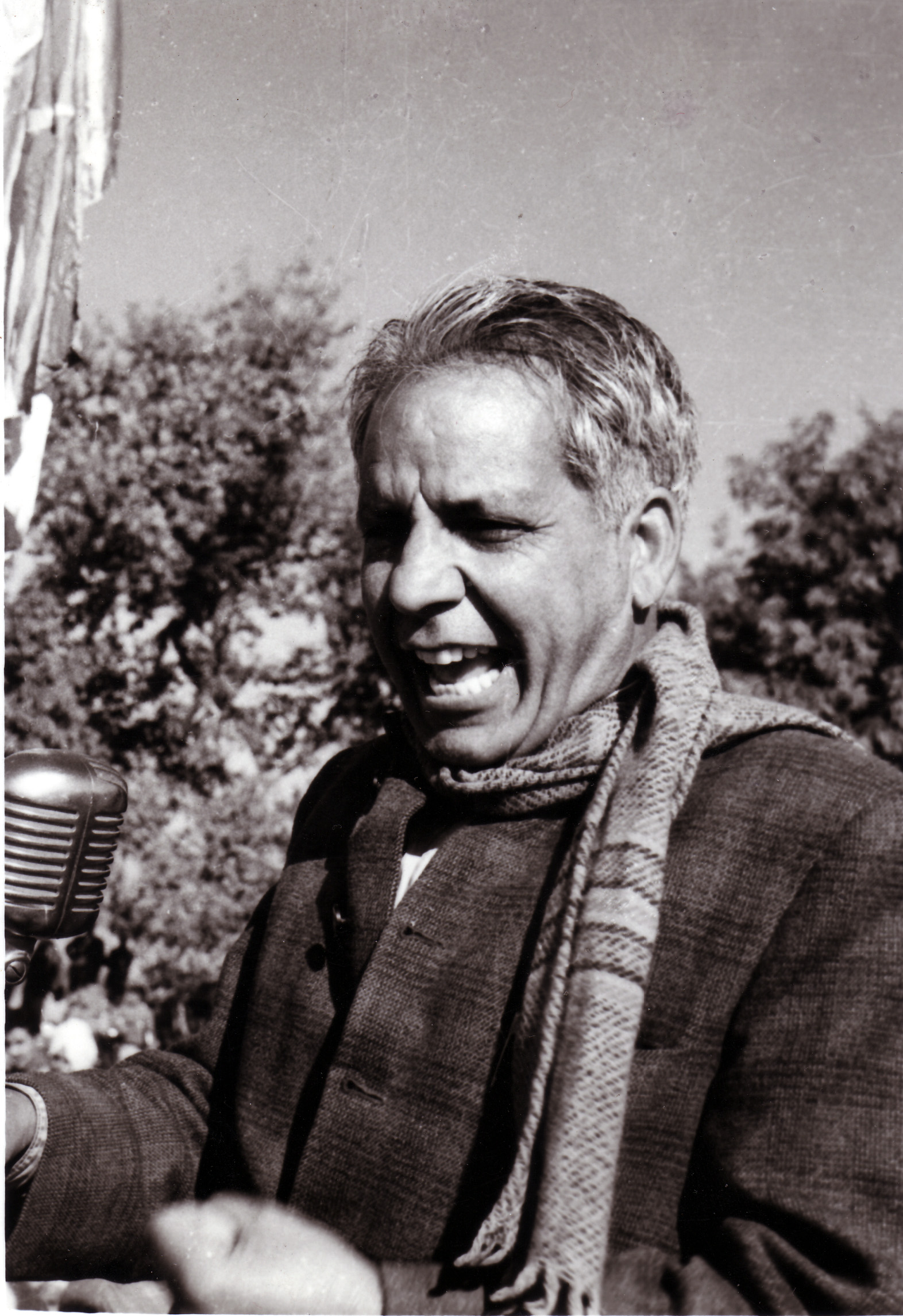
- Satyapal Dang at the funeral of Sohan Singh Bhakna in 1968

Minister for Food and Civil Supplies Department, Punjab
- In office 8 March 1967 – 25 November 1967

Member of Punjab Legislative Assembly
- In office 1967–1980
- Preceded by: Balramji Das
- Succeeded by: Sewa Ram
- Constituency: Amritsar West

Personal details
- Born: 4 October 1920 Gujranwala, British India
- Died: 15 June 2013 (aged 92) Amritsar, India
- Party: Communist Party of India
- Spouse: Vimla Dang
- Occupation: Freedom activist Politician
- Awards: Padma Bhushan

Satyapal Dang (1920–2013) was an Indian independence activist, writer and later-day politician from Punjab. He was a legislator of Punjab State Legislative Assembly, representing the Communist Party of India for four terms and a Minister of Food and Civil Supplies in the United Front ministry led by Justice Gurnam Singh. He was also involved in trade union movement in India, aligning with the All India Trade Union Congress (AITUC). The Government of India awarded him the third highest civilian honour of the Padma Bhushan, in 1998, for his contributions to society.

== Biography ==
Satyapal Dang was born on 4 October 1920 in Gujranwala of the erstwhile Punjab Province, British India and did his early schooling in Lahore. Getting involved in the Indian freedom movement during his student days, he worked with the leftist wing of the Indian National Congress in the beginning but moved the Communist Party of India and became an active worker in the Bombay Commune of the party in the 1940s. Later, he became the general secretary of the All India Students Federation at the age of 25, and participated in the 1st Party Congress hed in Mumbai in 1943. It was during this time, he had the opportunity to work alongside Vimla Bakaya, an associate from his student days who would later marry him in 1952. After the Indian independence and in the aftermath of Calcutta Thesis and resultant insurgencies, the party was banned and when the ban was lifted, Dang couple were entrusted with the responsibility of working amidst the working class in Amritsar region. The couple relocated to Chheharta Sahib, a village near Amritsar and in 1953, when the first local election was held, Dang became the president of Chheharta Municipality.

Dang was involved with the local politics of Chheharta Sahib for the next decade and a half, heading the municipality several times and working to develop the place into a model town. The shift in focus came in 1967 when he was asked by the Party to participate in the state elections and he successfully contested from Amritsar West constituency against Giani Gurmukh Singh Musafir, the then Chief Minister of Punjab. The United Front which included the Communist Party of India won majority in the elections and Dang joined the coalition ministry led by Justice Gurnam Singh as the Minister of Food and Civil Supplies. It is reported that he declined to use the ministerial bungalow and chose to stay in the MLA hostel during his tenure as the minister. He retained the seat in the next three legislative assembly elections held in 1969, 1972 and 1977 but lost in the 1980 election to Sewa Ram Arora, but his wife would regain the seat in 1982.

In the 1980s, during the Khalistan movement, Dang was known to have worked against the secessionism, with his base at Ekta Bhawan, a centre he had built in Chheharta. He also published two books, Terrorism In Punjab, a book detailing his views on the Punjab crisis and State Religion and Politics, an analytical report on religion and politics with reference to the politics of Punjab and Kashmir. The Government of India awarded him the civilian honor of the Padma Bhushan in 1998. Towards the later years of his life, he was afflicted with Alzheimer's disease and retired from active politics after the death of Vimla Dang in 2009. He died on 6 June 2013, at the age 92, at the Amritsar home of his nephew. The Dang couple were issueless, reportedly by their own choice. Once Upon a Time in Chheharta, a feature-length documentary made by his grandnephew, Nakul Singh Sawhney documents the life and work of Satyapal and Vimla Dang in Chheharta.

== Bibliography ==
- Satyapal Dang (2000). Terrorism In Punjab. GPH. p. 412. ISBN 978-8121206594.
- Satyapal Dang (2004). State Religion and Politics. GPH. p. 345. ISBN 978-8121208505.

== See also ==
- Vimla Dang
- Calcutta Thesis
