= Razapur =

Razapur Jat रज़ापुर जाट
- Jat Village
- Location in Uttar Pradesh, India Razapur Jat (India)
- Coordinates: 28.6648373°N 77.4623851°E
- Country: India
- State: Western Uttar Pradesh
- District: Ghaziabad

Government
  - Type: Panchayati raj (India)
  - Body: Gram panchayat

Population (2011)
  - Total: 16,627
- Sex ratio 1000/765♂/♀

Languages
  - Official: Khadiboli
  - Other spoken: Hindi
- Time zone: UTC+5:30 (IST)
- PIN: 201002
- Telephone code: 0120
- Website: ghaziabad.gov.in

Razapur Jat is a village in Ghaziabad of Western Uttar Pradesh State, India. It is located 2 kilometres (1.2 mi) from Ghaziabad, which is both district and metropolitan headquarters of Razapur Jat. The village is administrated by a municipal councilor who is an elected representative of village as per the constitution of India and Panchayati raj (India).

== Transport ==
Bibri, Dhaliwal Dona, Jhal Bibri, Saidowal, Kapurthala are the nearby Villages and Kapurthala, Kartarpur, Jalandhar Cantt., Jalandhar are the nearby Cities to Razapur.

=== Train ===
Kapurthala Railway station, Rail Coach Factory Railway station are the very nearby railway stations to Razapur, however Jalandhar City Railway station is major railway station is 23 km away from Razapur village.

=== Air ===
Raja Sansi airport:- 75 km, Pathankot airport:- 112 km, Ludhiana airport:- 74 km and Gaggal airport:- 152 km nearest airports are available to Razapur village.

== Schools ==
- Government High School, Razapur,

== Colleges ==
- College Of Engineering & Management, Kapurthala.
- Guru Nanak College Of Education For Women, Kapurthala.
- NSJA Government College, Kapurthala.
- CAPARO P.T.U.School Of Manufacturing And Materials Technology, Kapurthala.

== Air travel connectivity ==
The closest airport to the Jat village is Indira Gandhi International Airport.
