= Western Uttar Pradesh =

Region in northern India

- Region
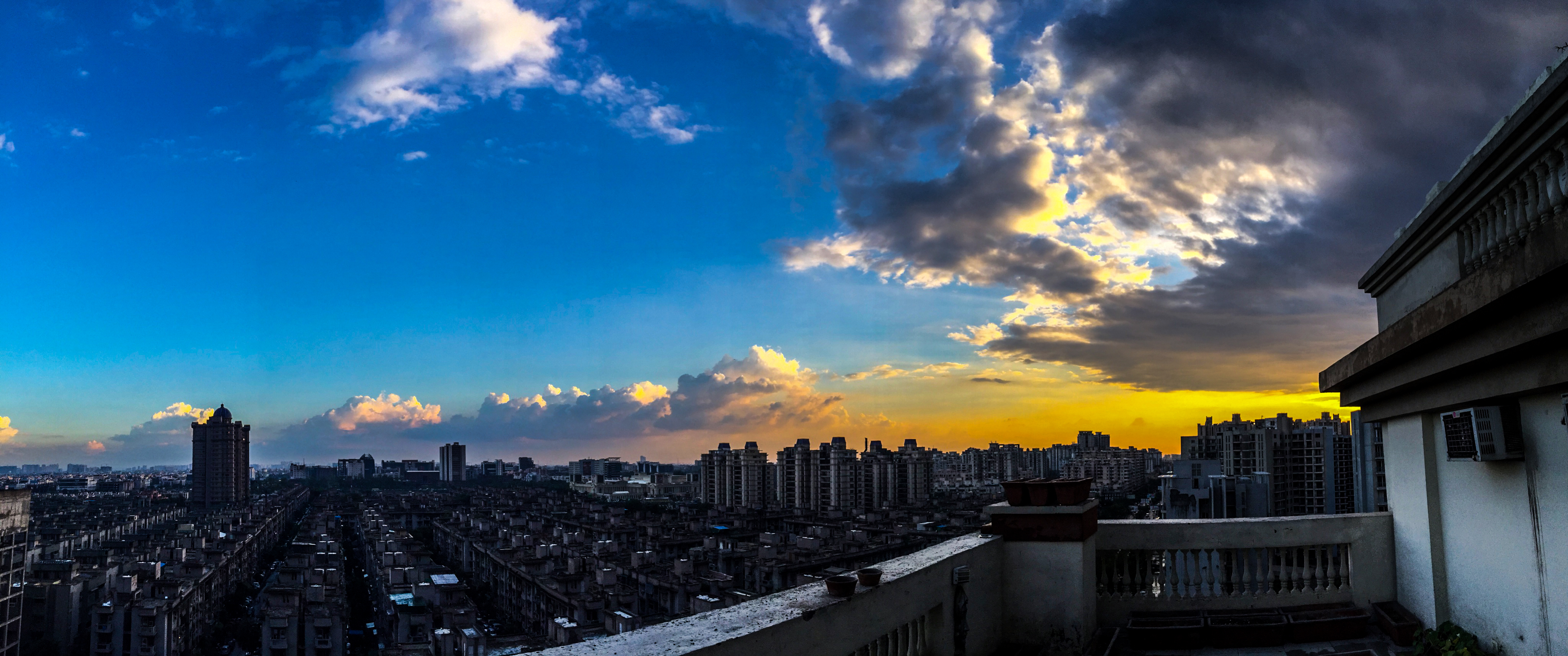
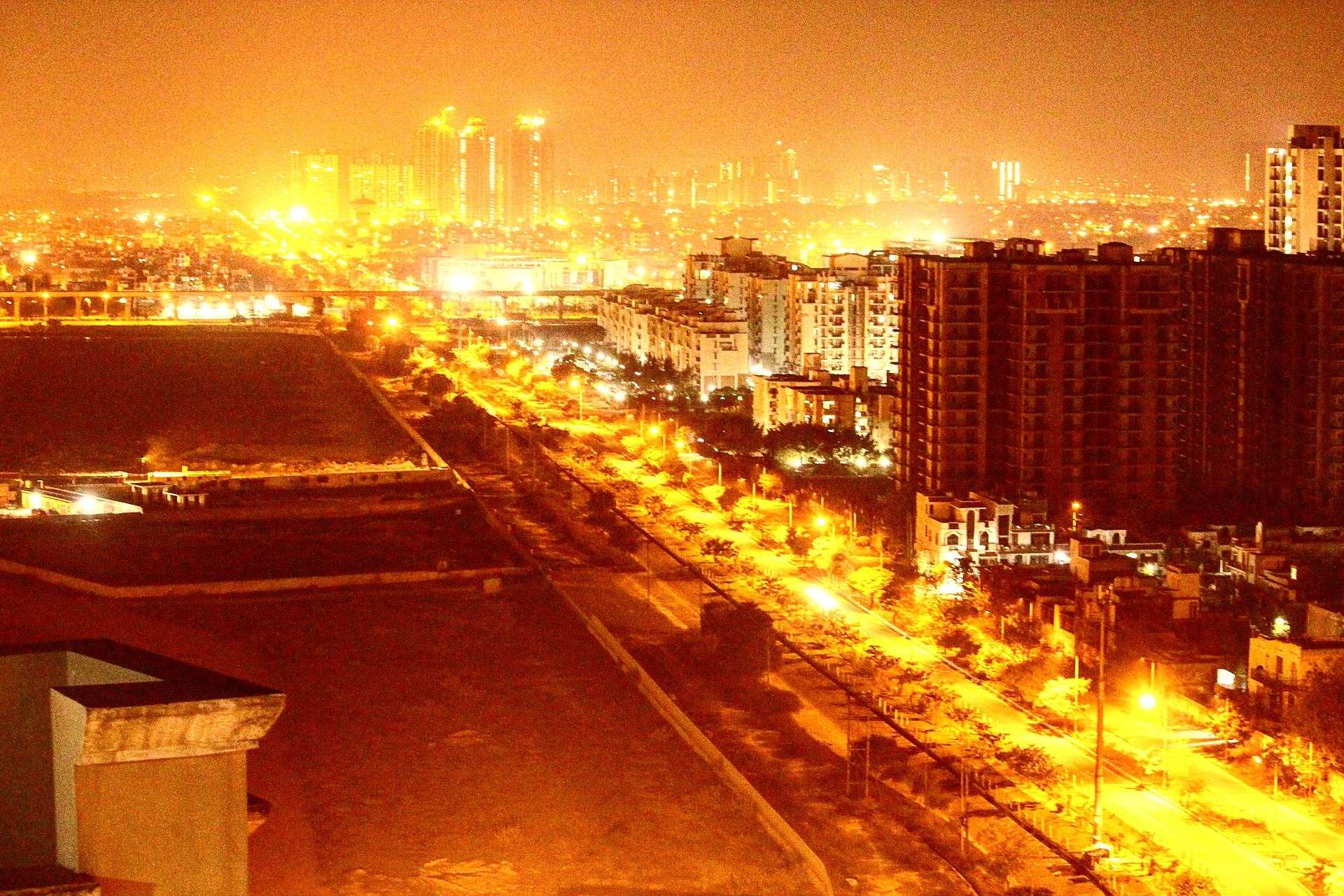
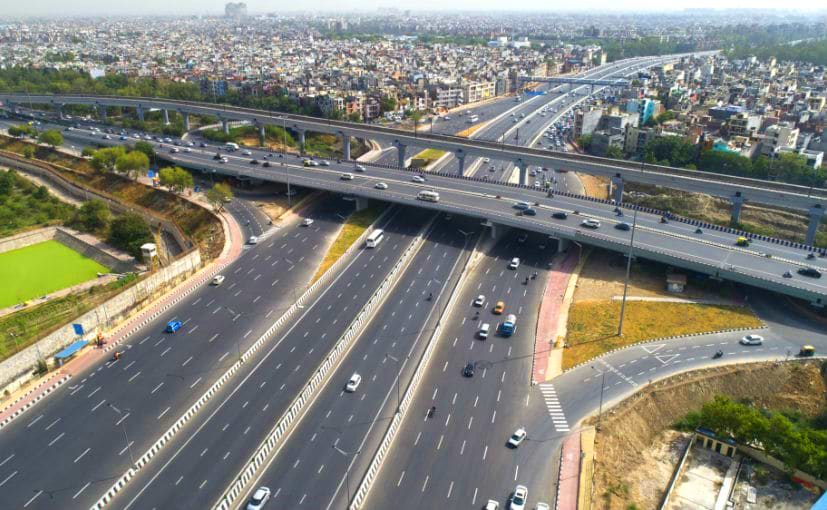
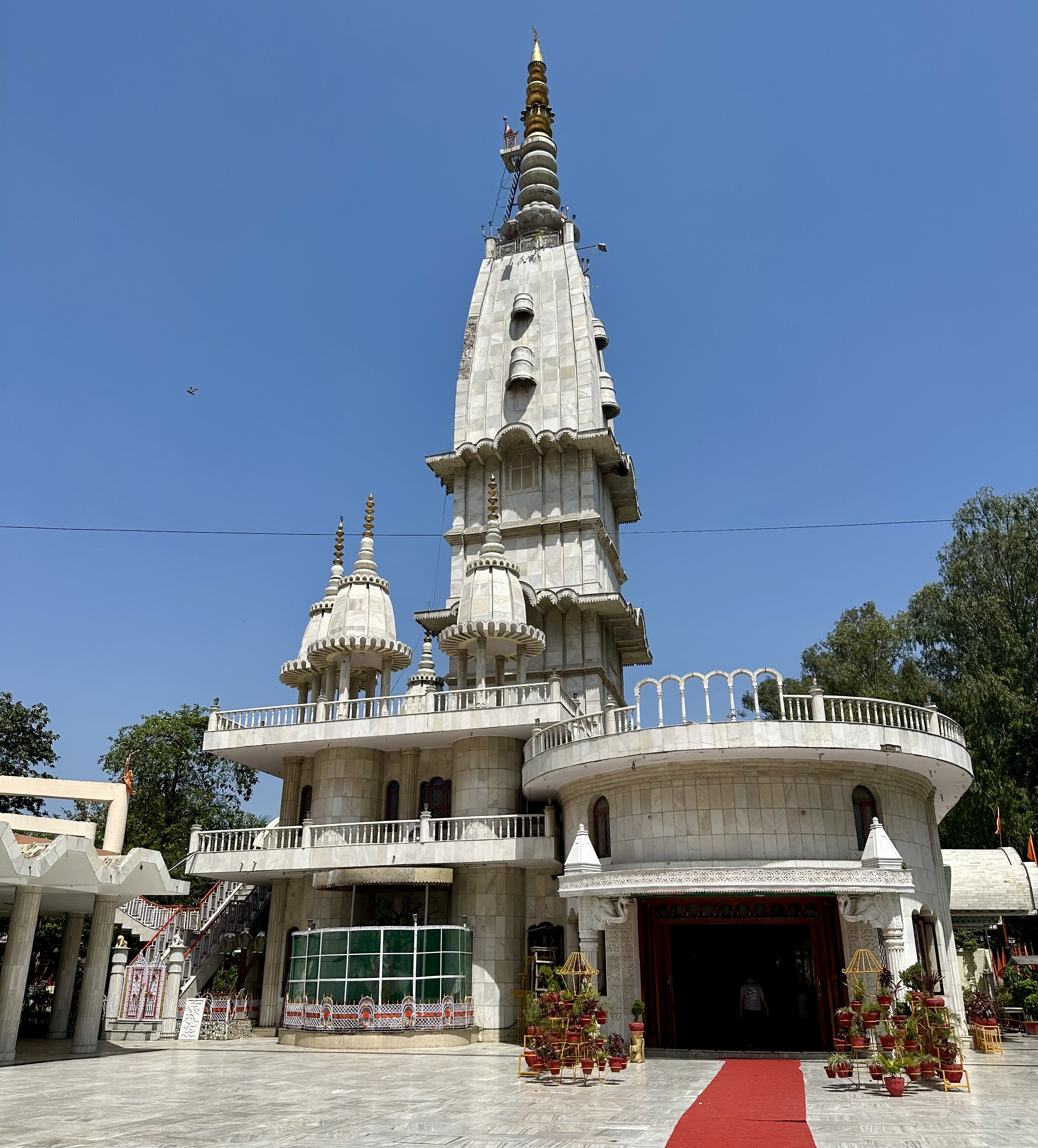
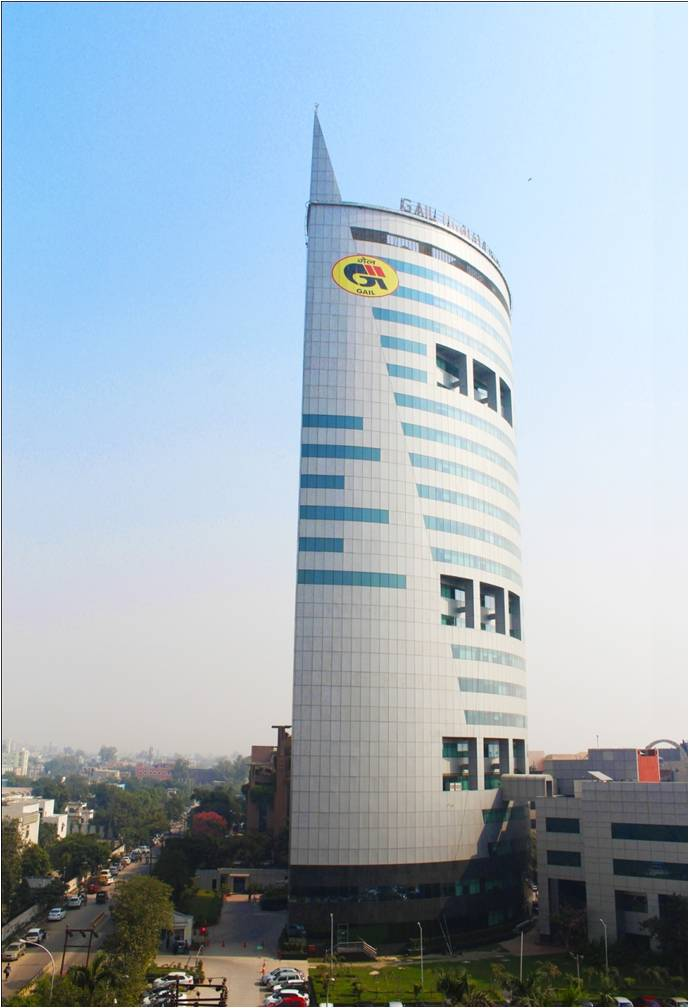
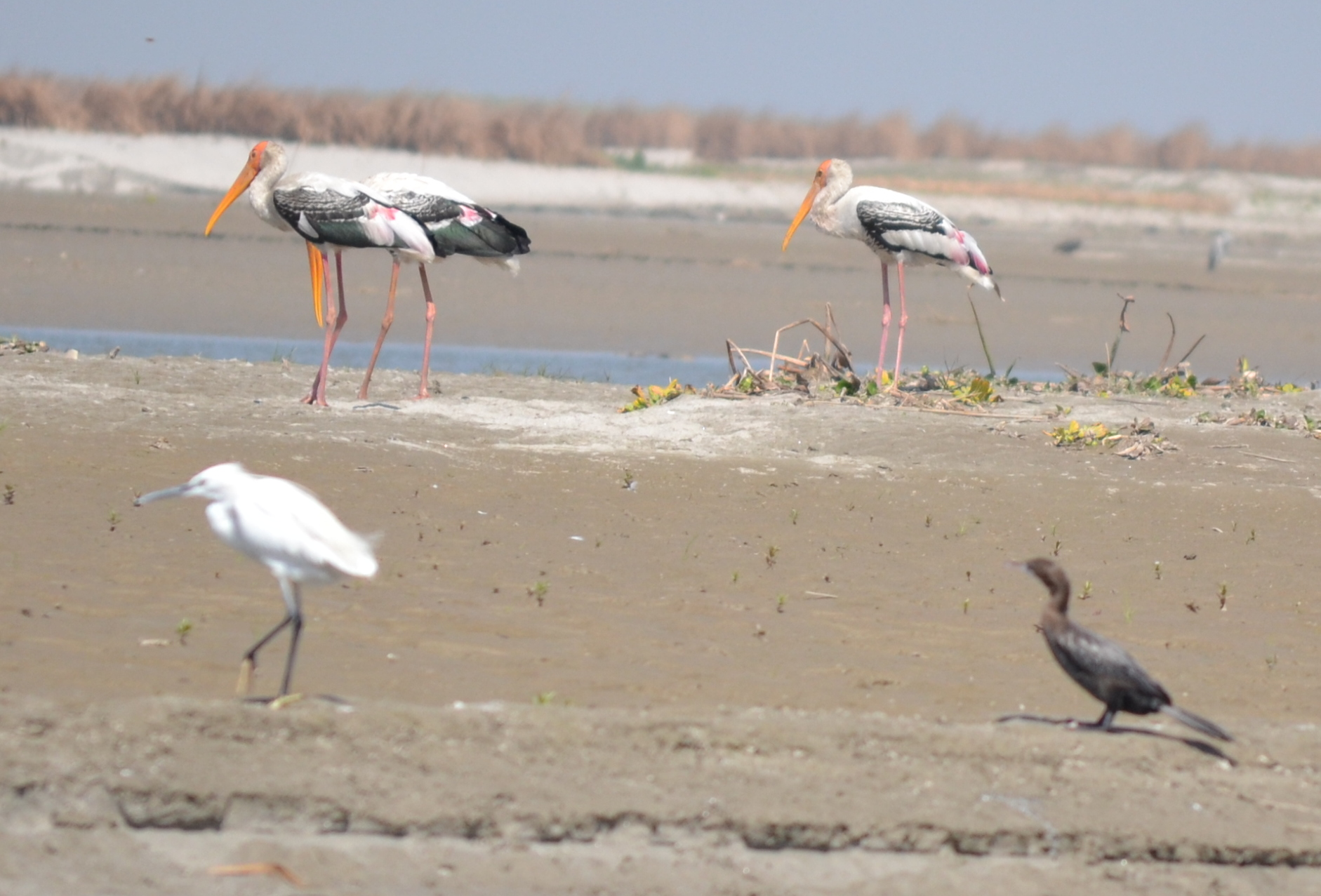
- Indirapuram, Ghaziabad Greater Noida Delhi–Meerut Expressway Augarhnath Temple, Meerut GAIL, Noida Hastinapur Wildlife Sanctuary

- Location of Western Uttar Pradesh in India
- Continent: Asia
- Country: India
- State: Uttar Pradesh
- Covering territory: Meerut division; Saharanpur division; Moradabad division; Bareilly division; Aligarh division; Agra division
- Languages: Hindi, Urdu, Braj, Khadiboli, Kannauji

Population (2011)
  - Total: 71,217,132
- Largest cities: Ghaziabad; Agra; Meerut; Noida; Bareilly; Aligarh; Moradabad; Saharanpur

Western Uttar Pradesh is a region in India that comprises the western districts of Uttar Pradesh, including the Upper Doab, Rohilkhand and Braj areas, where languages like Hindi, Urdu, Braj, and Khadiboli are spoken. The largest city of the region is Ghaziabad, while the second-largest city, Agra, is a major tourist destination.

It is in the region of Western Uttar Pradesh that Hindi-Urdu originated. The region has some demographic, economic and cultural patterns that are distinct from other parts of Uttar Pradesh, and more closely resemble those of Haryana and Rajasthan states.

Western Uttar Pradesh has experienced rapid economic growth, in a fashion similar to the states of Haryana and Punjab, due to the success of the Green Revolution. A significant part of western Uttar Pradesh is a part of National Capital Region of India.

== Demographics ==
Religions in Western Uttar Pradesh
Religion	Percent
Hindus	72.29%
Muslims	26.21%
Others†	1.41%
Distribution of religions †Includes Sikhs, Buddhists, Christians, Jains.

Religions in Khariboli sub-region
Religion	Percent
Hindus	62.19%
Muslims	36.17%
Others	1.64%

Religions in Braj sub-region
Religion	Percent
Hindus	82.78%
Muslims	16.00%
Others	1.22%

The population of Western Uttar Pradesh is composed of a varied set of communities and tribes, including Ahir (Yadavs), Gurjars, Jats, Brahmins, Meos, Rajputs, Kayasthas, Tyagis, Bhar (Rajbhars), Kachhi, Kahar (Kashyaps), Gadaria, Kumhar, Bania, Khatik, Lodha, Valmikis, Nai, Jatav, Kurmis and Rohilla Pashtuns.

The region in 1980s and 1990s was witness to the "sugarcane mafia" led by the above mentioned communities. Yadavs have a small presence in this region.

As per 2011 Census, the total population of Western Uttar Pradesh is 71,217,132, out of which 72.29% is Hindu and 26.21% is Muslim. The population in Khariboli region is 29,669,035, (Hindu 59.19% and Muslim 39.17%) and the population of Braj region is 29,754,755 (Hindu 82.78% and Muslim 16%). Muslim population share in eight districts of Saharanpur, Muzaffarnagar, Bijnor, Moradabad, Rampur, Jyotiba Phule Nagar, Meerut and Bareilly has increased from 29.93% in 1951 to 40.43% in 2011. This has been point of contention in politics with demands for population control bill being raised from Hindu groups.

The percentage of Muslims in Western Uttar Pradesh (~26%) is higher than the whole state of Uttar Pradesh (where it is 19.3%). Out of 77 assembly seats in this region, Muslim candidates won 26 seats in the 2012 assembly elections. Several communities are bi-religious.

The region's Rohillas are descended from immigrant groups from centuries ago, and a large subregion of Western Uttar Pradesh, Rohilkhand, takes its name from that Pashtun tribe.

Sikhs from West Punjab, who came from Pakistan after partition, also migrated to the area in large numbers.

== Languages ==
Most people in Western Uttar Pradesh speak Hindi (or its slightly earlier version Khadiboli) and Braj.

=== Khadiboli ===
Khadiboli is a slightly earlier version of Hindi and has very minimal differences. It is spoken in the northern part of Western Uttar Pradesh. Khadiboli-speaking districts include Muzaffarnagar, Saharanpur, Shamli, Bagpat, Ghaziabad, Meerut, Hapur, Amroha, Sambhal, Bijnor, Moradabad, Gautam Buddh nagar, and Bulandshahar.

=== Braj ===
Braj is spoken in the southern part of western Uttar Pradesh. Braj-speaking districts include Mathura, Hathras, Agra, Aligarh, Etah, Firozabad, Budaun, Gautam Buddh Nagar, Bulandshahr, Mainpuri, Bareilly and Sambhal.

=== Hindi and Urdu ===
In the area of Delhi and Western Uttar Pradesh, Persian loanwords entered the lexicon of Old Hindi (the form of Khariboli spoken in the medieval Indian period). This is regarded as the predecessor of Hindi and Urdu, both of which are spoken throughout Western Uttar Pradesh.

== Geography ==
Western Uttar Pradesh shares borders with the states of Uttarakhand, Himachal Pradesh, Haryana, Delhi, Rajasthan and Madhya Pradesh, as well as a brief international border with Nepal in Pilibhit district.

Western Uttar Pradesh's soil and relief has marked differences from that of the eastern part of the state. The soil tends to be lighter-textured loam, with some occurrences of sandy soil. Some loess soil is continuously deposited by winds blowing eastwards from Rajasthan's Thar Desert.

=== Precipitation ===
Western Uttar Pradesh receives rain through the Indian Monsoon and the Western Disturbances. The Monsoon carries moisture northwards from the Indian Ocean, occurs in late summer and is important to the Kharif or autumn harvest. Western Disturbances, on the other hand, are an extratropical weather phenomenon that carry moisture eastwards from the Mediterranean Sea, the Caspian Sea and the Atlantic Ocean. They primarily occur during the winter season and are critically important for the main staple of the region, wheat, which is part of the Rabi or spring harvest.

=== Administrative divisions ===
Western Uttar Pradesh includes 26 districts in six divisions:

1. Saharanpur division – Saharanpur, Muzaffarnagar, Shamli
2. Meerut division – Meerut, Baghpat, Ghaziabad, Gautam Buddha Nagar, Hapur, Bulandshahr
3. Moradabad division – Moradabad, Bijnor, Amroha, Sambhal, Rampur
4. Agra division – Agra, Mathura, Firozabad, Mainpuri
5. Aligarh division – Aligarh, Etah, Hathras, Kasganj
6. Bareilly division – Bareilly, Badaun, Pilibhit, Shahjahanpur

== Demands for statehood ==
In Uttar Pradesh, "the cultural divide between the east and the west is considerable, with the purabiyas (easterners) often being clubbed with Biharis." Also, while the green revolution resulted in a rapidly rising standard of living in Western Uttar Pradesh, Eastern Uttar Pradesh (like Bihar) did not benefit to the same extent. These cultural and economic disparities are believed to have fueled the demand for separate statehood in Western Uttar Pradesh. A separate entity would likely become a prosperous smaller state similar to Haryana and Punjab, under greater political control of local ethnic groups.

Some politicians and parties have demanded that Western Uttar Pradesh be granted statehood under the name Harit Pradesh. Braj Pradesh and Pashchim Pradesh are alternative names that have been proposed, because the region incorporates the historic region of Braj and is the western (pashchim in Hindi) part of Uttar Pradesh respectively.

== Religious riots ==
Western Uttar Pradesh has a history of religious riots happening frequently. Many Hindu and Muslim riots happened in Meerut and Muzaffarnagar. Beginning on 27 August 2013, clashes between the Hindu and Muslim communities of the Muzaffarnagar district have claimed 43 lives and injured 93.

Another major riot in Meerut took place on 22 May 1987, during the Hindu-Muslim riots in Meerut city in Uttar Pradesh state, India, when 19 personnel of the Provincial Armed Constabulary (PAC) allegedly rounded up 42 Muslim youth from the Hashimpura mohalla (locality) of the city, took them in truck to the outskirts, near Murad Nagar, in Ghaziabad district, where they were shot, and their bodies were dumped in water canals. A few days later, dead bodies were found floating in the canals. In May 2000, 16 of the 19 accused surrendered, and were later released on bail, while 3 were already dead. The trial of the case was transferred by the Supreme Court of India in 2002 from Ghaziabad to a Sessions Court at the Tis Hazari complex in Delhi, where it is the oldest pending case.

A riot broke out in the Kanth municipality of Moradabad district, on 27 June 2014, over installation of loudspeakers at a religious place, which was objected to by another community. The tension prevailed for over a week accompanied by frequent clashes. Another riot occurred between the Sikh and Muslim communities in Saharanpur over a land dispute, killing three and injuring many people. As much as 13 companies of the Rapid Action Force, the PAC and CRPF were conveyed by the government to take control of the situation after imposing curfew in riot-hit areas of Saharanpur.

== Highway connectivity ==
Major highways running through the region include NH 2, NH 3, NH 11, NH 9, NH 58, NH 73, NH 74, NH 87, NH 91, NH 509, NH 530B, NH 119, NH 235, NH 709A, NH 709B, NH 709AD,

- Noida Greater Noida Expressway
- Yamuna Expressway
- Agra Lucknow Expressway
- Eastern Peripheral Expressway
- Delhi-Meerut Expressway
- Ganga Expressway
- Delhi-Dehradun Expressway

== Media ==
Chalchitra Abhiyaan is a film and media collective based in Shamli district in Uttar Pradesh, India. It covers five districts of Western Uttar Pradesh, Shamli, Muzaffarnagar, Baghpat, Meerut, Saharanpur.

Filmmaker Nakul Singh Sawhney founded it after working on his acclaimed documentary Muzaffarnagar Baaqi Hai on the 2013 riots in Muzaffarnagar and Shamli district of North India that led to the displacement of over 100,000 people from the sugarcane belt.

Since 2016, the collective has trained people from these areas-both urban and rural-to bring their issues into the public domain through news reports, documentaries and films. Their core team includes riot survivors and former brick kiln workers and farmers among others.

They have actively reported on the agrarian crisis, landlessness among the Dalit community, sectarian violence, livelihood, labour rights, politics, and breakdown of the rural economy. Apart from distributing their reports and films online, they also take their video stories from village to village screening them on projectors at village choupals, panchayats, schools etc. They also screen international cinema in these rural parts, sometimes live translating the film because the illiterate villagers cannot read subtitles. The collective also runs a library.

== Notable people ==
Politics and law

- Santosh Gangwar
- S. P. Singh Baghel
- Sanjeev Balyan
- Shafiqur Rahman Barq
- Madan Bhaiya
- Chhatrapal Singh Gangwar
- Vedram Bhati
- B. S. Chauhan
- Jayant Chaudhary
- Laxmi Narayan Chaudhary
- Nand Kishor Gurjar
- Kesar Singh
- Ashok Katariya
- Azam Khan
- Suresh Kumar Khanna
- Malook Nagar
- Surendra Singh Nagar
- Satya Pal Malik
- Imran Masood
- Mayawati
- Sanjay Singh Gangwar
- Iqbal Mehmood
- Harendra Singh Malik
- Rajesh Pilot
- Rajkumar Sangwan
- Ajit Singh
- Charan Singh
- Chaudhary Digambar Singh
- Choudhary Virender Singh
- Hukum Singh
- Kadir Rana
- Kalyan Singh
- Meghshyam Singh
- Narain Singh
- Prakash Vir Shastri
- Satya Pal Singh (Uttar Pradesh politician)
- Surendra Pal Singh
- Tejpal Singh
- Manish Sisodia
- Rajkumar Chahar
- Mahavir Tyagi
- Nitin Tyagi
- Rajiv Tyagi
- K. C. Tyagi
- Satyavir Tyagi
- Somendra Tomar
- Ramveer Upadhyay
- Robert Vadra
- Ram Chandra Vikal
- Kumar Vishwas

Arts and Music

- Rati Agnihotri
- Raj Babbar
- Vishal Bhardwaj
- Bharat Bhushan
- Mahima Chaudhry
- Priyanka Chopra
- Dalip Tahil
- Lara Dutta
- Arun Govil
- Boney Kapoor
- Kailash Kher
- Dushyant Kumar
- Mandakini
- Disha Patani
- Naseeruddin Shah
- Nawazuddin Siddiqui
- Chitrangada Singh
- Pavitra Punia
- Sushant Singh
- Brijendra Kala
- Parag Tyagi
- Rajpal Yadav
- Kumar Vishwas
- Yuvika Chaudhary

Armed Forces

- Rakesh Kumar Singh Bhadauria
- Zameer Uddin Shah
- Jas Ram Singh
- Kushal Pal Singh
- Asaram Tyagi
- Shashindra Pal Tyagi
- Yogendra Singh Yadav

Academics/Research

- Shyam Swarup Agarwal
- Shiv Dayal Singh
- Jitendra Malik
- Giri Raj Singh Sirohi
- Kaka Hathrasi
- Javed Agrewala
- Girjesh Govil
- Anu Garg
- Abhaya Indrayan
- S. C. Jain
- Shahid Jameel
- Vinod Johri
- Amitabh Joshi
- Atma Ram
- Anil Kumar Tyagi
- Akhilesh Kumar Tyagi
- Deep Tyagi
- Yogesh Kumar Tyagi

Sports

- Rahul Chaudhari
- Dharampal Singh Gudha
- Saurabh Chaudhary
- Piyush Chawla
- Kavita Devi
- Bhuvneshwar Kumar
- Praveen Kumar
- Nishu Kumar
- Deepak Chahar
- Rahul Chahar
- Dhruv Jurel
- Rinku Singh
- Manu Attri
- Kiran Baliyan
- Vijay Kumar (athlete)
- Preethi Pal
- Parul Chaudhary
- Dinesh Chaudhary
- Arvind Singh (rower)
- Satish Kumar
- Seema Punia
- Suresh Raina
- Chandro Tomar
- Nitin Tomar
- Prakashi Tomar
- Annu Rani
- Sumit Rathi
- Varun Singh Bhati
- Parvinder Awana
- Shahzar Rizvi
- Saniya Shaikh
- Harsh Tyagi
- Kartik Tyagi
- Sudeep Tyagi

Revolutionaries

- Raja Mahendra Pratap
- Dhan Singh Gurjar
- Sah Mal
