= Neha Dixit =

Indian journalist and author

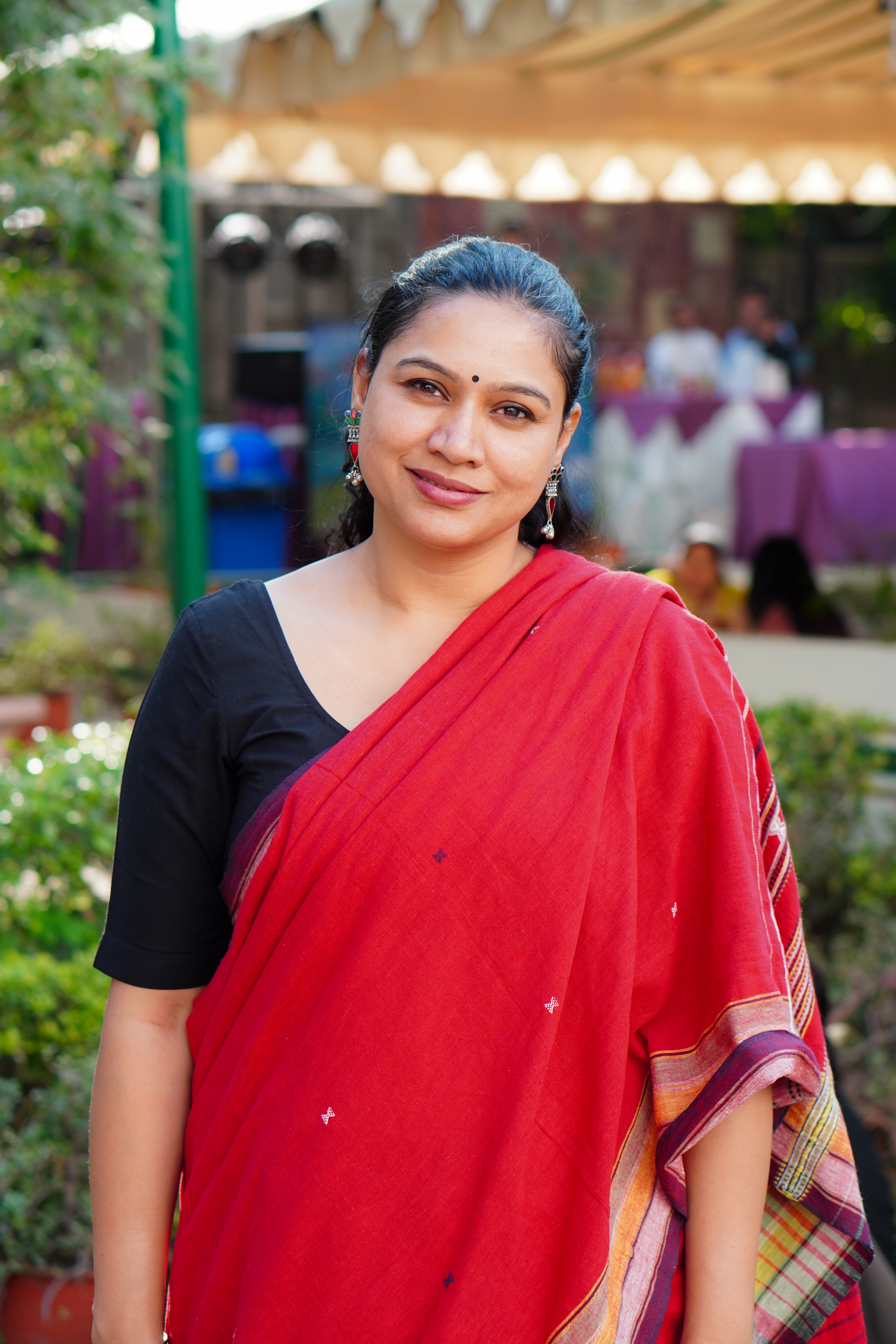
- Neha at Jaipur Literature Festival 2025
- Citizenship: India
- Education: Miranda House, Jamia Millia Islamia
- Occupations: Journalist, author
- Website: nehadixit.in

Neha Dixit is an Indian independent journalist and author based in India. She has over 18 years of experience in long form, investigative reportage, with a focus on intersections of gender, politics, and social justice. Her work has been published in multiple mediums, including online, print, and television.

She has been awarded over a dozen awards, including the Chameli Devi Jain Award (2016) and the CPJ International Press Freedom Award (2019).

== Early life and education ==
Neha attended school in Lucknow, and graduated in English Literature from Miranda House, University of Delhi. Thereafter, she pursued a Masters in Convergent Journalism from the AJK Mass Communication Research Centre, Jamia Milia Islamia in New Delhi.

== Career ==
Neha began her career as an investigative journalist with Tehelka, before switching to the Special Investigation Team of India Today. Since 2012, she has been a freelancer. Her works have been published in The Wire, Al Jazeera, Outlook, The New York Times, The Caravan, Himal Southasian, and The Washington Post, among others.

She has investigated and exposed a wide range of human rights violations including extrajudicial killings by police, hate crimes, human trafficking involving right-wing Hindu fundamentalist organisations, clinical trials on the marginalised by the pharmaceutical industry, and sectarian majoritarian violence in South Asia. She has also written political profiles and looked at the intersections of gender, class and caste under majoritarian governments.

=== Notable reports and awards ===
In August 2014, Dixit detailed the circumstances faced by seven rape survivors of the 2013 Muzaffarnagar riots. This won her the 2014 Kurt Schork Award in International Journalism and the 2015 Press Institute of India-Red Cross award.

In 2016, Dixit chronicled (for Outlook) the abduction of 31 girls from Assam by a Hindu nationalist organization to infuse them with "nationalist ideologies". A criminal defamation suit was subsequently filed against Dixit, in what was condemned by Committee to Protect Journalists as a tool of intimidation. The same year, she was conferred with the Chameli Devi Jain Award, the highest honor for women journalists in India: her meticulous nature of coverage and cross-checking of involved facts were admired in particular.

In 2018, she reported on poor Indians, who were unethically drawn into participating in illegal drug trials by major pharmaceutical companies. In 2019, Dixit documented a range of extrajudicial killings by police forces in Uttar Pradesh and other states, receiving threats from high-ranking police officials in the process. Her reports prompted a note of concern by Office of the United Nations High Commissioner for Human Rights. The same year, she received the CPJ International Press Freedom Award.

She has been a visiting faculty at several institutions, including Ashoka University, MCRC, Jamia Millia Islamia University, NALSAR, Hyderabad and IIMC.

=== Books ===
In 2016, Neha was one of the first Indian journalists to use a graphic format for reportage. She contributed a story "The Girl Not from Madras" to the comic book anthology 'First Hand: Graphic Non-fiction from India', about the exploitation of women in India.

She contributed a chapter on sexual violence during sectarian violence in India to 'Breaching the Citadel', an anthology of sexual violence in South Asia 2016 by Zubaan Books.

She wrote the piece, 'Outcast[e]/Outlawed: The Bandit Queen (1996)' for the book "‘Bad’ Women of Bombay Films: Studies in Desire and Anxiety" published by Palgrave Macmillan. Her piece details the history of desire and anxiety underlying the cinematic representation of the modern Indian woman.

=== The Many Lives of Syeda X: The Story of an Unknown Indian ===
On 14 August 2024, Dixit's first non-fiction book, 'The Many Lives of Syeda X: The Story of an Unknown Indian' published by Juggernaut Books was launched in Delhi. The book looks at the last three decades of Indian socio-political and economic turmoil through the eyes of an urban poor, migrant, working-class woman and her family.

The book was published in UK, Ireland, Australia and other commonwealth countries on May 1, 2025 by Footnote Press, an imprint of Bonnier Books.

It has been translated now in four languages: Hindi, Telugu, Malayalam and Marathi.

The book was selected as the Book of the Year 2024 by The Hindu and the Deccan Herald. It won the 2025 Ramnath Goenka Sahitya Samman award and 2025 Kalinga Literary Best Debut Award for this book. The book also received an Honorable Mention by the CG Moore Prize for Human Rights Writing in 2026.

‘Neha Dixit is awarded the Ramnath Goenka Sahithya Samman for Best Debut for The Many Lives of Syeda X: The Story fan Unknown Indian, a work of grave moral attention and disciplined reportage. Through the life of an unnamed woman, Dixit traces the quiet yet enduring fortes of gender, poverty and institutional power that govern contemporary Indian existence.

Written with restraint, empathy and investigative clarity the book restores dignity to a life rendered invisible by neglect and silence. It resists facile resolution, allowing contradiction and complexity to speak in their own register. By revealing how an individual life bears the weight of larger social truths,

It was also shortlisted for the Atta-Gallata Award, Kerala Literature Festival and Auther Award.

Dixit received the New India Fellowship in 2017 for this book driven by long research and narrative journalism. It tells the story of an impoverished Muslim migrant family in India's capital, negotiating the pitfalls of politics and economic servitude, holding up a mirror to the shadows behind the sheen of "New India."

Umar Khalid reviewed the book for 'The Wire' from Tihar jail. He wrote:

"Dixit’s conceptual clarity is remarkable, and she writes with deep empathy for the people. She constructs a virtual social history, or history from below. Dixit reminds us that a journalist’s job is not to act as an amplifier for the establishment’s propaganda, but to bring into focus the people and issues that are conveniently invisibles and disregarded."

Rahul Jacob wrote in the Mint Lounge, 'There will likely not be a better book of gritty Indian reporting for years to come-and certainly none that takes contemporary Indian economic myth-making to task as The Many Lives of Syeda X poignantly does.’

Ruben Banerjee wrote in The Federal that 'The story that Dixit ends up writing is a paean to the grit and gumption of the untold millions adrift on despair in urban India, narrated without condescension. The book is also as much a testimony to the author’s bottomless commitment to narrate and document real stories of a mass of real and unsung people that should really matter.

Soutik Biswas writes in the BBC: "Ms. Dixit’s book shines a spotlight on the invisible lives of India’s neglected female home-based workers."

Urvashi Butalia wrote that the book was "a remarkable, quiet, and yet devastating account of... an ordinary woman’s life... In setting Syeda’s life, and that of the people around her, against these larger developments, Neha Dixit also skillfully weaves in the larger story of 'India' and the complexities of 'modernity', attentive all the time to what modernization means for the poor and vulnerable. And yet, unlike so much writing about the poor, Dixit is never patronizing. Indeed, her restrained, unadorned prose, does not turn her characters into victims, or indeed gloss over their 'flaws'. Instead, she brings a storyteller’s skill to her characters who, within the space of a few spare lines, become real people, oppressed, exploited and yet, able to sometimes negotiate with power, and other times defeat it by just stepping away and, on rare occasions, confront it (as Syeda does when she joins a union), vent their anger at it, and win the battle... It is precisely for this quietness, this matter-of-factness, this simplicity and truthfulness that this book must be read. It offers those of us who live with privilege, a mirror to the casual cruelty and indifference towards those less privileged, that informs our lives."

== Personal life ==
Dixit is married to Nakul Singh Sawhney, an Indian documentary filmmaker.

Dixit has been charged with "inciting hatred" by the Government of India, a move that has been criticized by the Committee to Protect Journalists. Because of her reporting, she has been subjected to threatening calls and an attempted acid attack and a break attempt in her house.

Year	Award
2025	Ramnath Goenka Sahitya Samman (Best Debut)
2025	Kalinga Literary Award (Best Debut)
2020	One Young World Journalist of the Year
2019	International Press Freedom Award 2019, Committee To Protect Journalists
2019	23rd Human Rights Press Awards, Hong Kong Press Association
2019	Special Mention, ACJ Award for Investigative Journalism
2017	Chameli Devi Jain Award for Outstanding Woman Journalist
2015	PII-ICRC Award for Best report on Humanitarian Subject
2014	Kurt Schork Award in International Journalism
2013	UNFPA-Laadli Media Award for Gender Sensitivity. Best Investigative Feature
2013	Trust Women Honorary Journalist of the Year, Thomson Reuters Foundation
2013	Thomson Foundation-Foreign Press Association Young Journalist Award
2012	Best TV News reporter, News Television Awards
2011	Lorenzo Natali Prize for Journalism, Asia-Pacific Region
2010	News Television Award for Best Investigative Feature
2010	UNFPA-Laadli Media Award for Best Investigative Feature
2009	Anupama Jayaraman Memorial Award for Young Women Journalists
