= Vimla Dang =

Indian politician

Padma Shri Vimla Dang

Member of Punjab Legislative Assembly
- In office 1992–1997
- Preceded by: Sewa Ram
- Succeeded by: Om Parkash Soni
- Constituency: Amritsar West

Personal details
- Born: Vimla Bakaya; 26 December 1926 Lahore, British India
- Died: 10 May 2009 (aged 82) Amritsar, India
- Resting place: Amritsar; 30.75°N 76.78°W
- Spouse: Satyapal Dang
- Occupation: Social worker
- Awards: Padma Shri

Vimla Dang (1926–2009) was an Indian social worker and politician, known for propounding the Dang school of Politics, reportedly a stream of politics adhering to the values of integrity and honesty. She was a leader of the Communist Party of India and a Member of the Punjab Legislative Assembly representing Amritsar West constituency. Two of the organizations she co-founded, Punjab Istri Sabha and the Punjab Istri Sabha Relief Trust are engaged in providing education to the children of those who lost their lives during the Punjab insurgency of the 1970s and 80s. The Government of India awarded her the fourth highest civilian honour of the Padma Shri in 1991.

== Biography ==
Vimla Dang, née Vimla Bakaya, was born on 26 December 1926 in a Kashmiri family at Lahore in the British India and did her early education in the local schools. She was involved with student politics early on when she became a member of the Lahore Students’ Union. Her graduation was at Wilson College, Mumbai during which time she continued her involvement in student politics. She was a part of the All India Students Federation (AISF) delegation which visited the state and engaged in the relief activities of the Bengal famine of 1943. She also attended the first Party Congress of the Communist Party of India held in Bombay in 1943. Later, she moved to Prague, capital of Czechoslovakia, joining the International Students Union (ISU), and spent a few years there involved with the organization's activities.

Before she returned to India, she lost her elder brother, Sashi Bakaya, a poet, who died in Bombay at the age of 25 in 1946. Once in India, she worked for several publications as a correspondent. In April 1952, she married Satpal Dang, a Communist thinker and her acquaintance from Lahore. The couple settled in Chheharta Sahib, a satellite town of Amritsar, where they continued their social and political work for the development of the area. The couple headed the Municipal Council of the town several times, Vimla Dang holding the post of the president of the Chhehrata Municipal Committee from 1968 till 1978 and is credited with transforming the town into a model town in Punjab. It was during Vimla Dang's tenure as the head of the Municipal Committee, the first creche in the state of Punjab was established in Chhehrata. In 1954, she co-founded Punjab Istri Sabha and a relief trust, Punjab Istri Sabha Relief Trust, under the aegis of the Sabha, for assisting in the education of the children of the war victims. The Sabha and the Trust were active during and after the Punjab insurgency of the 1970s which lasted till the 1990s, helping with children's education.

The Government of India included her in the 1991 Republic Day honours list for the civilian award of the Padma Shri. The next year, she contested the 1992 Punjab Legislative Assembly elections, and won from the Amritsar West constituency. She was an office bearer of National Federation of Indian Women and served as a member of the National Council of the Communist Party of India till her voluntary retirement from the Council due to old age. However, she continued her social activities, associating with Punjab Istri Sabha and Aruna Asaf Ali Memorial Trust, an NGO founded in 1997, in the name of the Bharat Ratna awardee.

Vimla and Satpal Dang lived in the Party office and had no children, by their own choice. Vimla Dang fell ill on the International Workers' Day of 2009, after participating in the flag hoisting ceremony at the Party's Chheharta office and died ten days later, on 10 May 2009, at the age of 83, her husband surviving her for another four years. Her autobiography, Fragments of an Autobiography, was published two years prior to her death, edited by her elder brother, Ravi M. Bakaya, a former professor of Russian at Jawaharlal Nehru University.

== See also ==
- Satyapal Dang
- Communist Party of India
