= Chalchitra Abhiyaan =

Indian film and media collective

- Founded: 2016
- Founder: Nakul Singh Sawhney
- Founded at: Muzaffarnagar, Shamli, Baghpat, Meerut, Saharanpur
- Website: chalchitraabhiyaan.com

Chalchitra Abhiyaan is a film and media collective based in Shamli district in Uttar Pradesh, India. It covers five districts of Western Uttar Pradesh, Shamli, Muzaffarnagar, Baghpat, Meerut, Saharanpur.

Filmmaker Nakul Singh Sawhney founded it after working on his acclaimed documentary Muzaffarnagar Baaqi Hai on the 2013 riots in Muzaffarnagar and Shamli district of North India that led to the displacement of over 100,000 people from the sugarcane belt.

Since 2016, the collective has trained people from these areas-both urban and rural-to bring their issues into the public domain through news reports, documentaries and films. Their core team includes riot survivors and former brick kiln workers and farmers among others.

They have actively reported on the agrarian crisis, landlessness among the Dalit community, sectarian violence, livelihood, labour rights, politics, and breakdown of the rural economy. These issues are often not reported in corporate mainstream media that focuses on target audience-generated profits.

Sawhney views the team’s work as a “cultural intervention in the Gramscian sense” and feels that these everyday spaces and day-to-day recreational activities can be an effective means to break the hegemony of dominant ideological formations.

== Film screenings and use of mobile theatres to disseminate news ==
They are also unique in their dissemination of news. Apart from distributing their reports and films online, they also take their video stories from village to village screening them on projectors at village choupals, panchayats, schools etc. They also screen international cinema in these rural parts, sometimes live translating the film because the illiterate villagers cannot read subtitles.

Since most of the single screens have shut down in small towns in India which were an affordable way for people to watch cinema together, the film screenings are a way to reintroduce collective viewing of quality content and cinema that is no longer accessible in socio-economically marginalised sections of India. The aim is to initiate discussions and debates on the contemporary socio-economic realities of India and the world.

Some films that have stimulated intense dialogue among the community include Sadgati (directed by Satyajit Ray), Kala (directed by Rohit V.S.) and Raam ke Naam (directed by Anand Patwardhan), Children of Heaven (directed by Majid Majidi) among others.

Over the past few years, they have developed dedicated viewership in more than ten villages where on average 60 to 100 people watch films together on a weekly basis. The post-screening discussions on news and cinema create a healthy space to debate, critique, and discuss contemporary issues.

The screenings are sometimes disrupted by political goons either by instigating village pradhans or by disconnecting the electricity supply.

Over 3,000 people attend film and news screenings annually.

They have been attacked and detained several times for reporting these issues.

== Reading room and Travelling Library ==
The collective also runs a library that is used by young people in Kandhla as a reading room, film screening space and training centre, where they study, discuss readings and films and learn the basics of video production. These training programs are designed for rural West UP youth to gain professional skills in film-making, editing, journalism and media training.

CCA also runs travelling library in West UP where members take books to children in remote villages on bikes to introduce them to different kinds of literature which is inaccessible in small towns. This library program is designed to take books to children in villages to inculcate love for books

The travelling library reaches 1,000 children annually.

== Youtube Channel ==
CCA’s Youtube Channel started in 2016. It is an archive of news and feature stories from West UP. It has 150k subscribers, all of them organically built with viewers from rural areas where most people from marginalised sections do not have resources and internet. It has over 1800 ground reports and over 22 million views. It is one of the largest Youtube channels with ground reportage from rural North India.

CCA has been awarded the Digital Empowerment Foundation Award twice for People's Participation and for bringing social change.
