= Dinesh Chaudhary =

Indian Paralympian track and field athlete (born 1996)

Personal information
- Born: Ghaziabad, Uttar Pradesh, India

Sport
- Country: India
- Sport: Para-athletics
- Disability class: F42
- Coached by: Lakhwinder Singh
Medal record
Representing India
Para Grand Prix
Gold medal – first place	2019 Morocco	Shotput - F42
National Para Athletics Championship
Gold medal – first place	2021 Bangalore	Shotput - F42
Gold medal – first place	2022 Orrisa	Shotput - F42
Gold medal – first place	2023 Pune	Shotput - F42

Dinesh Chaudhary is an Indian para-athlete. He won gold at the 2023 World Para Athletics Grand Prix in Morocco 2019. He was diagnosed with Post-polio residual paralysis when he was two years old. He primarily competes in the Paralympics shot put event in the F42 category.

== Career ==
Dinesh Chaudhary started his athletics career in 2016 and secured gold for India in the men's shot put F42 event at Morocco Grand Prix in 2019. In 2018, he won silver at the National Para Athletics Meet in Panchkula. At the National Para Athletics he won a gold medal with a national record of 12.30m.

== See also ==
- Athletics in India
- India at the 2022 Asian Para Games
