= SEQU3L =

Indian DJ and producer

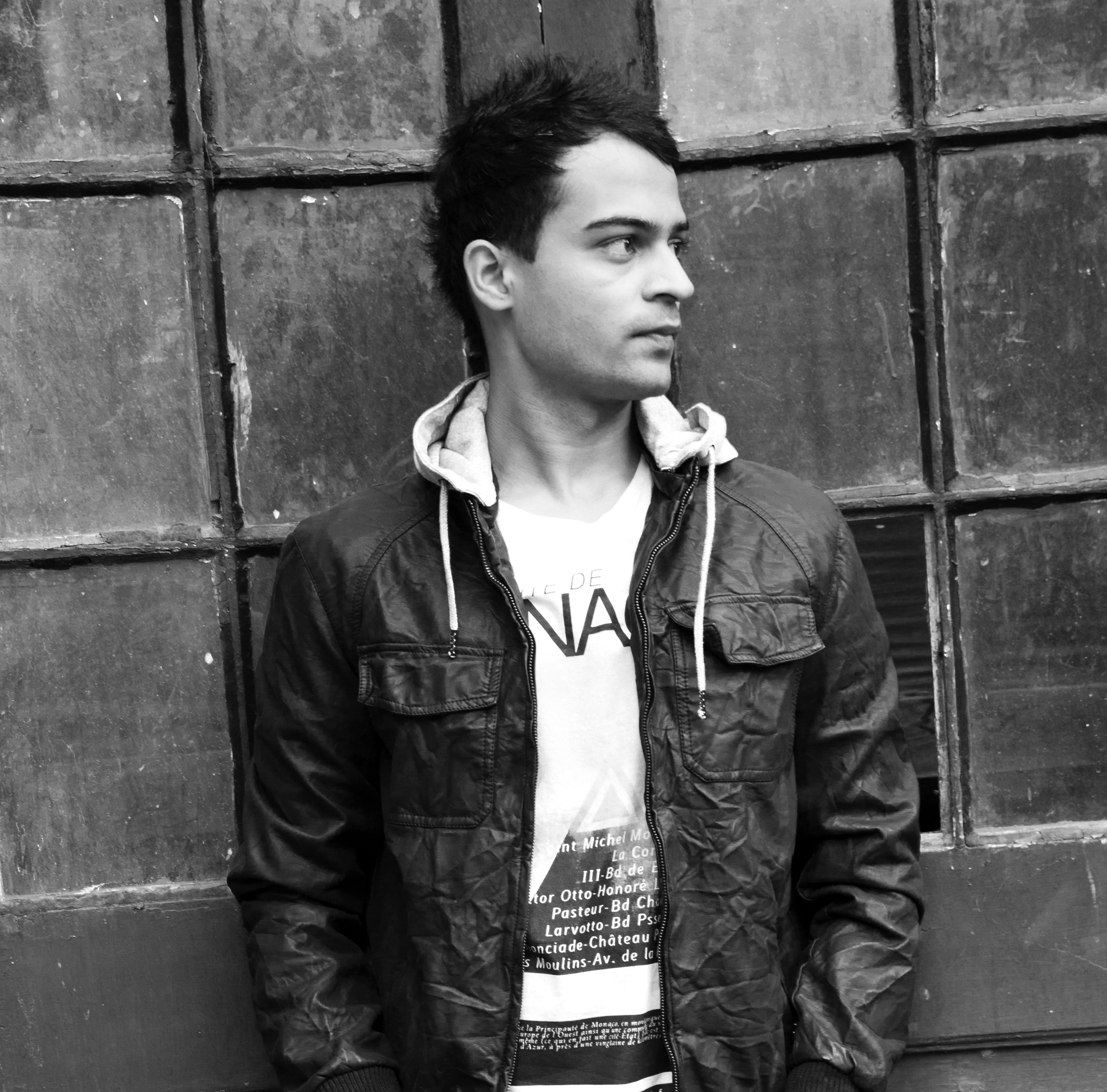

Background information
- Born: Nakul Ambilkar; 1 January 1986 (age 39); Aurangabad, India
- Genres: Dance, progressive house
- Occupation(s): DJ, record producer, remixer

Nakul Ambilkar (born 1 January 1986), better known by his stage name SEQU3L, is an Indian DJ, record producer and remixer. SEQU3L has worked on production and remix projects with many notable electronic music artists such as Funkagenda, Paul Thomas, Andrea Bertolini, Steve Haines, Max Freegrant.

In 2012 SEQU3l won "Sunburn Anthem Contest 2012" and performed at Sunburn Festival, Asia's biggest dance music festival. SEQU3L has been nominated twice for VH1 MyFav Dj of the year awards (House Dj category).

== Career ==
=== DJ ===
Born in Aurangabad, India, and raised in a musical family, SEQU3L developed an early interest in melody and rhythm. In 2005 he moved to Pune city where he first garnered attention as a DJ. From the very early days he performed alongside India's best DJs and had been touring regularly all over India for music festivals like Sunburn in Goa, The Mud Rush (Pune), Dfusion (Lonavala), Dance Electrique (Guwahati), Enchanted Valley Carnival festival. SEQU3L has played in the parties and clubs all over Middle East and Asia, including India's hottest spots like – Blue Frog (Mumbai), Kitty Su (Delhi), Penthouze (Pune), Cape Town Cafe (Goa), Cloud 9 (Shillong).

It was not long before his parties would provide him the success and creative stimulation necessary to move to the next rational step and build a studio at his home where music production would become his full-time focus.

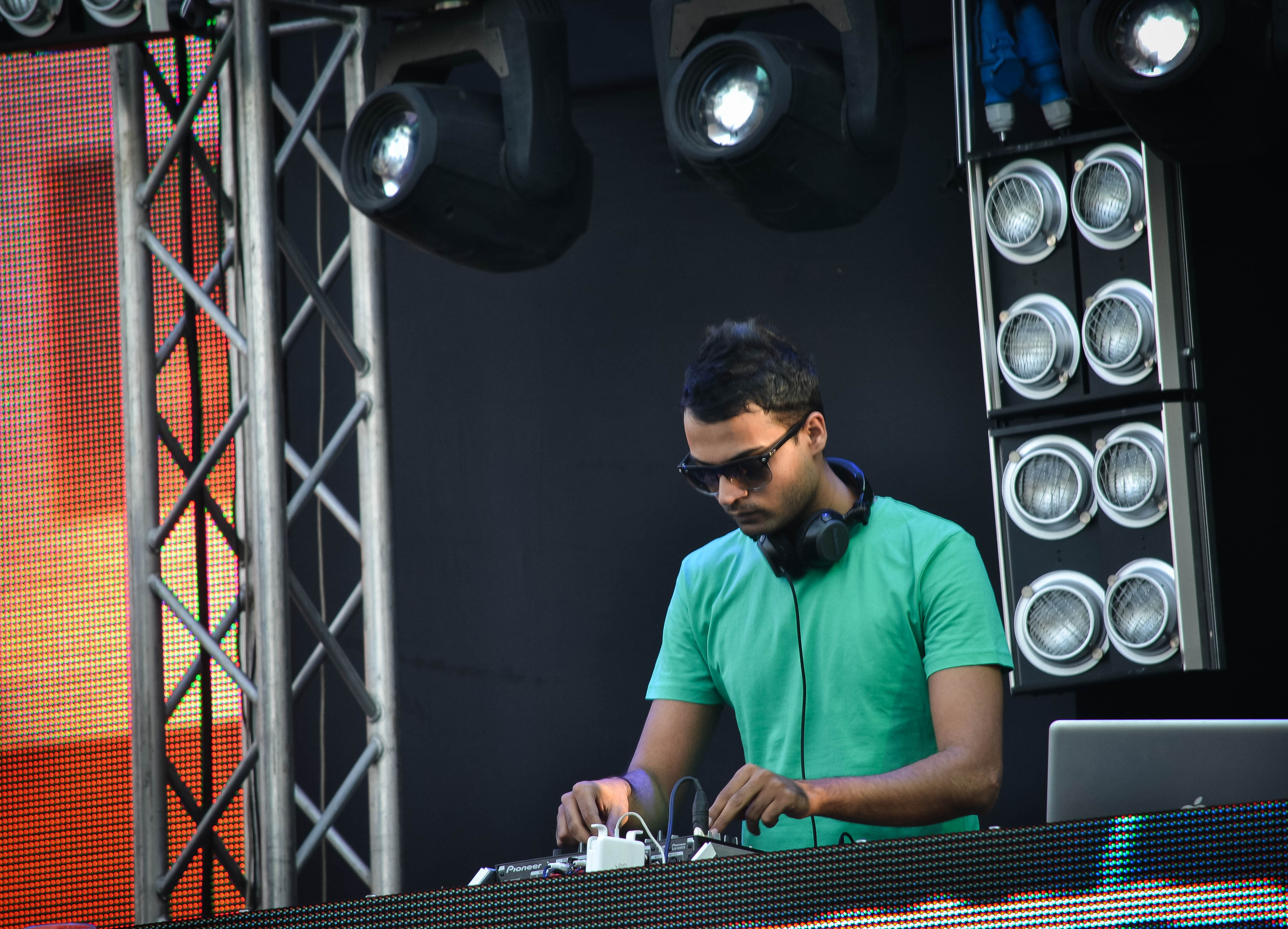
SEQU3L at Mud Rush Festival, India, 2013.jpg

=== Producer ===
In 2013 SEQU3L went from locally-known DJ to an internationally-rising producer which landed him collaborations with artists like Paul Thomas, Scott James, Steve Haines.

His first track "We Evolve" has received massive support by other international artists, such as trance duo Grube & Hovsepian who played the track in Winter Music Conference 2013 (Miami) as well as by top Indian DJs such as Nikhil Chinapa who played the track in his radio show "In the Mix" on Radio One. Eventually, it got signed by Markus Schulz for Buenos Aires '13 compilation CD on Armada Music. His second original track "Ataraxia" landed in Beatport's chart "Top 10 Must Hear Progressive House" and received support from the industry legends such as Nick Warren.

His remixes of 21street "Jakarta dream", Paul Thomas & Steve Haines "Shillong", Future Disciple "Jupiter Fruit" received regular air plays on top radio shows by well-known electronic music artists such as Above & Beyond, Markus Schulz, Max Graham, Jaytech, Paul van Dyk, Gareth Emery, Jes, Steve Haines, Paul Thomas and many more.

== Discography ==
=== Singles ===
- 2014 : Booka Booka (UltraViolet Music)
- 2015 : "Every Goodbye" (Magik Muzik)
- 2015 : "Ignite" with Scott James (Magik Muzik)
- 2014 : "Every Goodbye" (Freegrant Music)
- 2014 : Ignite with Scott James (Ultraviolet Music)
- 2013 : Ataraxia (Movement Recordings)
- 2013 : A Starfall Night (Movement Recordings)
- 2013 : We Evolve (Armada Music)
- 2013 : We Evolve (original mix)(Freegrant Music)

=== Remixes ===
- 2015 : Paul Thomas & Steve Haines – Shillong Nights (Black Hole Recordings)
- 2015 : Steve Haines & CBM – Memphis (Perfecto Records) (Black)
- 2014 : Paul Thomas & Steve Haines – Shillong (UltraViolet Music)
- 2014 : Max Freegrant – Revive (Freegrant Music)
- 2014 : Steve Ness – Veterans (OLD SQL)
- 2014 : Kasper Koman – All Ein (Movement Recordings)
- 2014 : Future Disciple – Jupiter Fruit (Music Matters)
- 2014 : CBM – Zagg (Discover Deep)
- 2014 : Simon Firth – Stress Test (Juicebox Music)
- 2013: Andrea Bertolini – Lazy Monday (Freegrant Music)
- 2013 : Magitman & Tash – Volt Afterhours (Movement Recordings)
- 2013 : Smooth Vision & Alaris – Liberty (Pleasure Records)
- 2013: 21street – Jakarta Dream (Outta Limits)
- 2013 : Scott James & Alex Draym – Terminal (Pleasure Records)
- 2013 : Stan Kolev & Matan Caspi – Kalimankude (Outta Limits)
