= Nakul Shenoy =

Indian magician

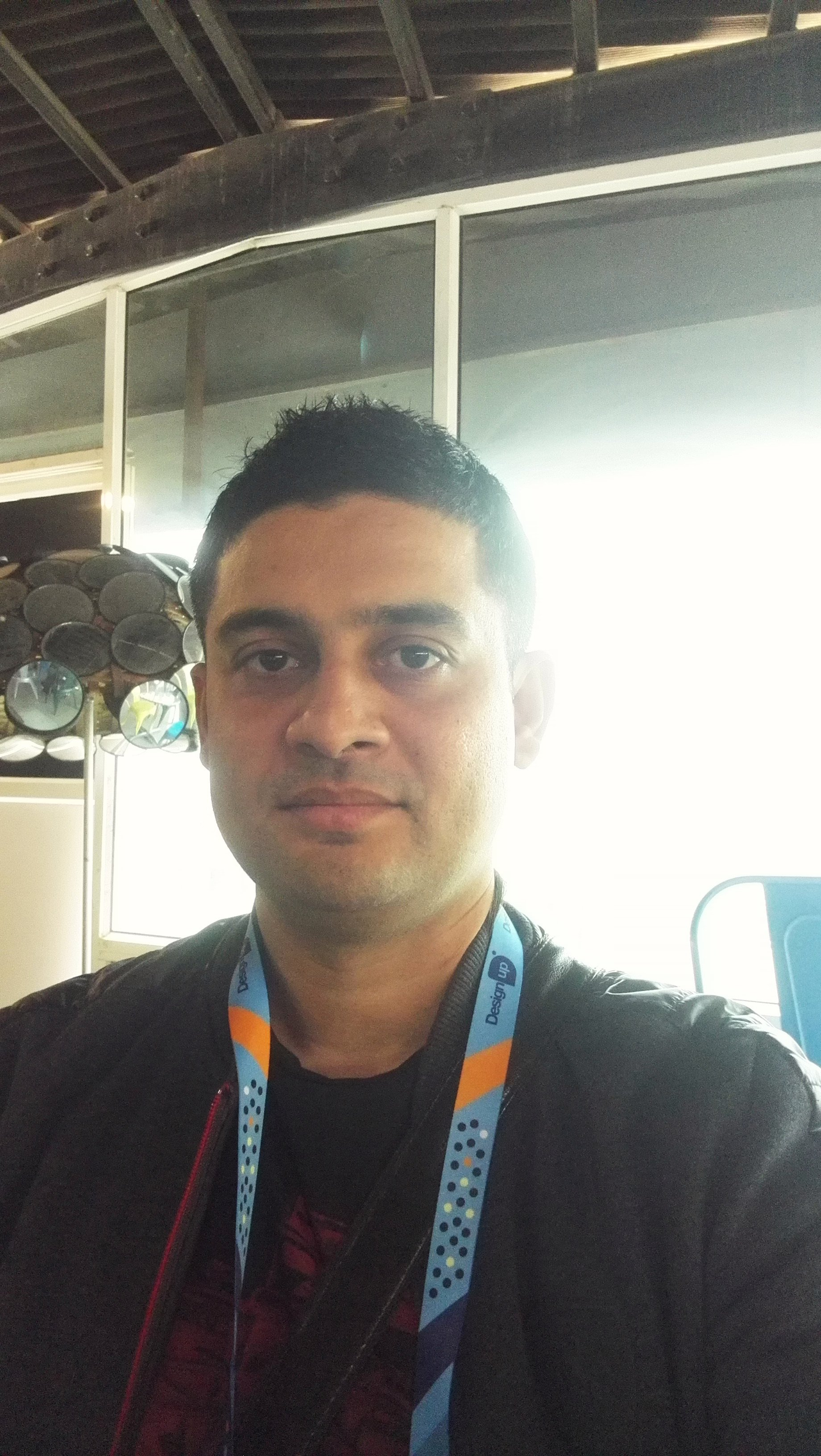
- Born: Udupi, Karnataka, India
- Occupations: Magician, IT Professional
- Website: www.nakulshenoy.com

Nakul Shenoy is an Indian mentalist, mind reader, and psychic entertainer based in Bangalore, India. Fascinated by the comic book hero Mandrake The Magician as a child, he grew up to be a magician and hypnotist. He presented his first public show at age 16 in Udupi and by 2003, he was entertaining corporates in Bangalore with his mentalism show. He is a skeptic and has used his knowledge of magic to rally against pseudoscientific scams like tri-vortex bangle and mid-brain/third-eye activation. Having presented his first magic show in 1994, he continues to entertain audiences internationally with his mind reading show. Nakul is the author of 'Smart Course In Magic' published by HarperCollins in 2015 and also holds two US patents in design. He studied the potential of magic as a medium of communication to earn his Master of Science (Communications) degree from Manipal University (MAHE) in 2000. He has appeared on television via NDTV, CNBC, Asianet and has been written about in over 40 media articles including India Today, Times of India, The Hindu, Mint, Business Outlook, and Yahoo.
