= Nakul Singh Sawhney =

Indian documentary filmmaker

- Years active: 2006-to present
- Employer: Independent Documentary Filmmaker

Nakul Singh Sawhney is an Indian independent documentary filmmaker and cultural activist. His films have an indepth, intersectional lens that show the impact of caste, class, gender, politics and social justice in South Asia.

He is the founder of Chalchitra Abhiyaan, a film and media collective that trains local people from marginalised communities of North India to report and make films on their issues. They also screen films and news reports in several villages on mobile projectors with hundreds of viewers in addition to running a mobile library.

His upcoming docuseries, 'A Million Churnings' looks at the 2020-2021 farmers' protest, the largest and the longest protest in modern world history. It is India's first independent political docuseries.

== Early life ==
He grew up in Delhi and attended Kirori Mal College in Delhi University. He was as active member of Players, the dramatic society of the college. He then completed a course in direction at the Film and Television Institute of India, Pune, during 2005–06. Nakul was also actively involved with Jana Natya Manch. He is the grand nephew of Communist leader Satyapal Dang.

== Notable works ==
=== Muzaffarnagar Baaqi Hai ===
His film 'Muzaffarnagar Baaqi hai that released in January 2015 is an extensively researched film on the sectarian violence in North India in September 2013, Muzaffarnagar riots, just a few months before the general elections in India. The film traces the economic, communal and sociological fallout of the violence that not just led to religious polarisation for political gains but also displaced hundreds of thousands of people.

The screening of the film was stopped by right wing fundamentalists from the Akhil Bhartiya Vidyarthi Parishad in Delhi University on 1 August 2015 where the filmmaker and the organisers including University professors were attacked. Following which over 200 protest screenings of the film were organised all across the country to mark dissent and support freedom of expression in India. Rohith Vemula, a Dalit PHd scholar, also screened the film in Hyderabad Central University on 4 August 2015 for which he was termed 'anti-national'.

The film has been extensively screened and appreciated in India and screened abroad including MIT, Columbia School of Journalism, SOAS, NYU and others. It was also selected by Mumbai International Film Festival and the International Film Festival of Kerala.

This film was hosted on Netflix for three years from 2016 to 2019.

=== Izzatnagri ki Asabhya Betiyan ===
His film 'Izzatnagri ki Asabhya Betiyan' (Immoral Daughters in the Land of Honour) released in January 2012 traces the resistance of young women against honour killings and diktats of clan councils called Khap Panchayats in North India. The film explores caste, class and gender intersectionality in contemporary India. Another version of the same film 'Immoral Daughters' has been screened at several international film festivals.

=== Savitri's Sisters at Azadi Kooch ===
A short documentary on the how two Dalit women, Laxmiben and Madhuben, from rural Gujarat march to reclaim the land that rightfully belongs to Dalits, a community subjected to untouchability practices and acute socio-economic marginalisation . Released in 2017. Screened at Oxford University, Göttingen University, and others.

=== Kairana, After the Headlines ===
The film tries to look at the town of Kairana beyond the externally imposed binaries of Hindu-Muslim, and tries instead to look at the real issues that confronts the town. Released in 2016. Screened at several universities in India and globally

=== With a Little Help from my Friends ===
He directed his first film in 2005, 'With a Little Help from my Friends', which won the award for the 2nd best film at the 60 Seconds to Fame film festival in Chennai.

=== Other works ===
At the Film Institute, he directed a short film, 'Agaurav' starring Divyendu Sharma and Jaideep Ahlawat and 'Undecided' that won awards for the 2nd Best Film and Best Director respectively at the Hyderabad International Film Festival. After completing his course, he made a feature-length documentary 'Once upon a time in Chheharta' on the history of the working class movement and the mill workers of Chheharta under the leadership of Communist leaders Satyapal Dang and Vimla Dang, Amritsar.

He is also a commentator on Indian politics and has appeared on The Quint, The Mojo Story, NDTV, The Wire and written for The New Indian Express, DailyO, Caravan and others.

He is married to independent journalist Neha Dixit.

=== Chalchitra Abhiyaan ===
He founded Chalchitra Abhiyaan in 2016. This film and media collective trains local people from marginalised communities in film technologies. The collective produces a range of video-based content prime among which are short-document films, news features, and live broadcasts. The goal is try to bring to the fore local issues from the grassroots that concern different marginalised communities in their own voices. The collective also organizes film and video screenings including international cinema and news features in remote villages in North India. It is followed by debate and discussion on the topic. Attended by hundreds of people weekly, this has built a regular, large offline viewership. They also run a mobile library in several villages of West UP.

Year	Film
2017	Savitri's Sisters in Azaadi Kooch
2016	Kairana, After the Headlines
2015	Muzaffarnagar Baaqi hai/Muzaffarnagar Eventually
2012	Izzatnagri Ki Asabhya Betiyan/Immoral Daughters in the Land of Honour
2010	Once Upon a Time in Chheharta
2007	Agaurav
2005	With A Little Help From Friends
