= Calcutta Thesis =

1948 resolution of the Communist Party of India

Calcutta Thesis is the popular name for the resolution adopted by 2nd Congress of the Communist Party of India held at Kolkata in 1948.

== Overview ==
The Communist Party of India's second congress at Calcutta on 28 February 1948, the Zhdanov line of insurrection was adopted on the premise that 'free' India was only a "semi-colony of British imperialism". Open call for taking up arms, known as 'Calcutta thesis' and was closely identified with its main proponent and the then General Secretary, B. T. Ranadive. As a result, insurgencies took place in Tripura, Telangana and Travancore.

A new revolutionary mass upsurge—a veritable People's Democratic Revolution—was thus envisaged throwing itself up, just round the corner. It only remained for the party to come forward and take up the leadership of that 'revolution.' The elemental force of postwar mass-upsurge as evidenced by the INA movement, naval mutiny & worker's strikes, the 'Tebhaga' movement etc., had by no means diminished or become exhausted. The masses were thoroughly disillusioned. "Never was there", it was asserted in the Calcutta Thesis, "so much understanding of the main slogans of the democratic movement." Out of the disillusionment of the masses the demand for an alternative Government was bound to arise soon; and it was the duty of the Communist Party to consciously guide the people in fighting for that demand boldly and decisively. The call was therefore given for the formation of a "Democratic Front" based on the alliance of the workers, peasants and the oppressed petty-bourgeoisie under the leadership of the working class and the communist Party. This "Democratic Front" was to form the basis of the new state-power of the toiling people and the new government after the overthrow of the present bureaucratic system.

== Armed resistance ==
Framed in the language of the international Stalinist "People's Democratic" line, the resolution called for an immediate mass struggle against the Congress-led state governments. Party leaders anticipated that disillusionment with the Congress government's handling of the postwar economic crisis would draw "larger and larger sections of the masses" into political action. In several regions, including Telangana, Tripura, and Travancore, this led to armed uprisings, in which Communist-led peasant and worker groups came into direct conflict with government security forces.

The armed rising of the peasants in the Telangana area of Hyderabad against feudal Jagirdars there, were held up as a sort of fore-runner of the coming all-national uprising. The peculiar correlationship of forces in the unsettled conditions of Hyderabad after 'transfer of power' and the withdrawal of British Government from the formal position of suzerainty over the Native States, were not taken into account. The tussle between the feudal Nizam Government and the Central Government of the Indian Union under the national bourgeois leadership of the Congress, the democratic struggle of the Hyderabad people against the absolutism of Nizam, the struggle of the Communal Fascist Razakars both against the democratic, State-people's movement and against any encroachment of the Nizam's dominions by the Indian Union, and the simultaneous anti-Deshmukh (as the big feudal lords were called in this area) struggle of the Telangana peasants—all these going on simultaneously, often merging, often cutting across each other, created a general confusion which enabled the peasant revolt in the outlying Telangana area to take on an armed character with comparative ease than might be possible elsewhere. But without any reference to the specific features of the Telangana movement and to the feasibility of creating favourable conditions for armed insurrection elsewhere in the country outside Telangana, the entire party was called upon by the Party leadership to go the "Telangana way."
