= Chheharta Sahib =

- Suburban town
- Interactive map of Chheharta Sahib
- Coordinates: 31°37′39″N 74°47′34″E
- Country: India
- State: Punjab
  - Summer (DST): (UTC+5.30)
- Postal code: 143105

Chheharta Sahib is a town located 7 km west of Amritsar city of Punjab in India, on the Grand Trunk Road leading to the Pakistan border. The town derives its name from the Gurudwara Chheharta Sahib, established by the fifth Sikh Guru Guru Arjan Dev.

== History ==
Guru Arjan Dev ji, the fifth Sikh guru, had a large well constructed in this area. The well was so large that it required 6 Persian wheels to operate. Chheharta got its name from the six wheels, where six is chhe (Punjabi: ਛੇ), and the Persian wheel is called hart (Punjabi: ਹਰਟ ).

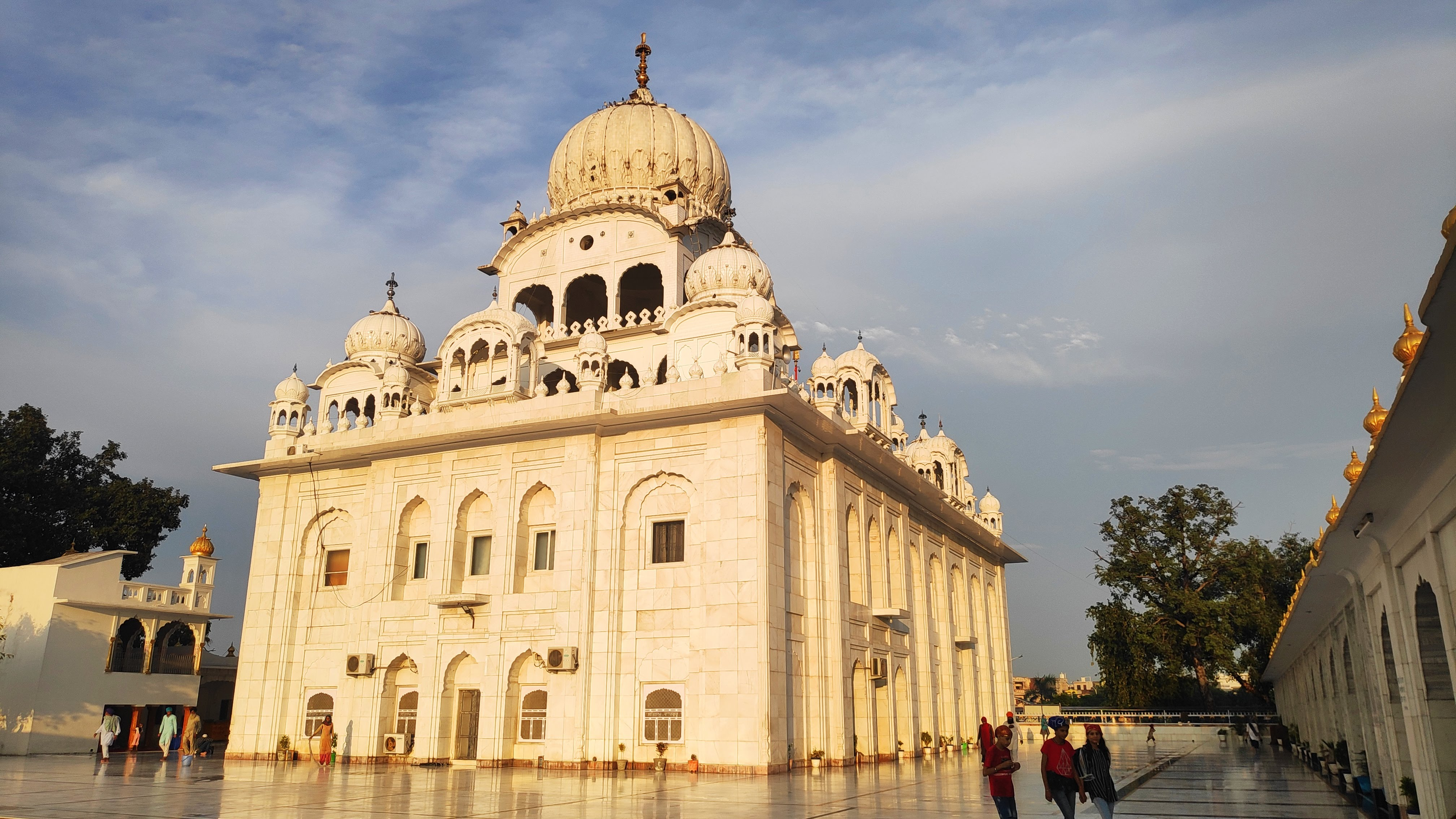
Gurudwara Chheharta Sahib

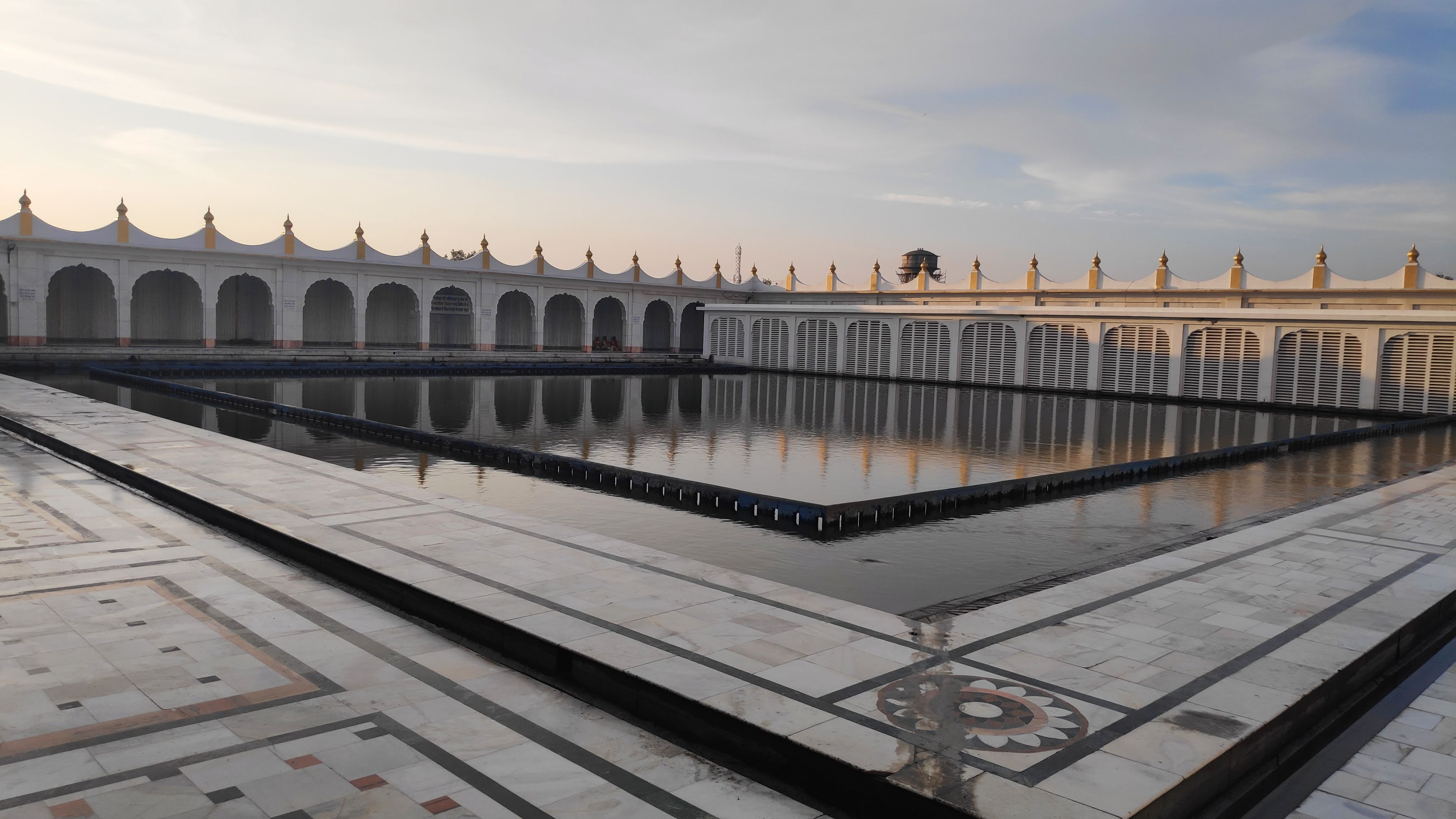
Gurudwara Chheharta Sahib Sarovar (holy pond)

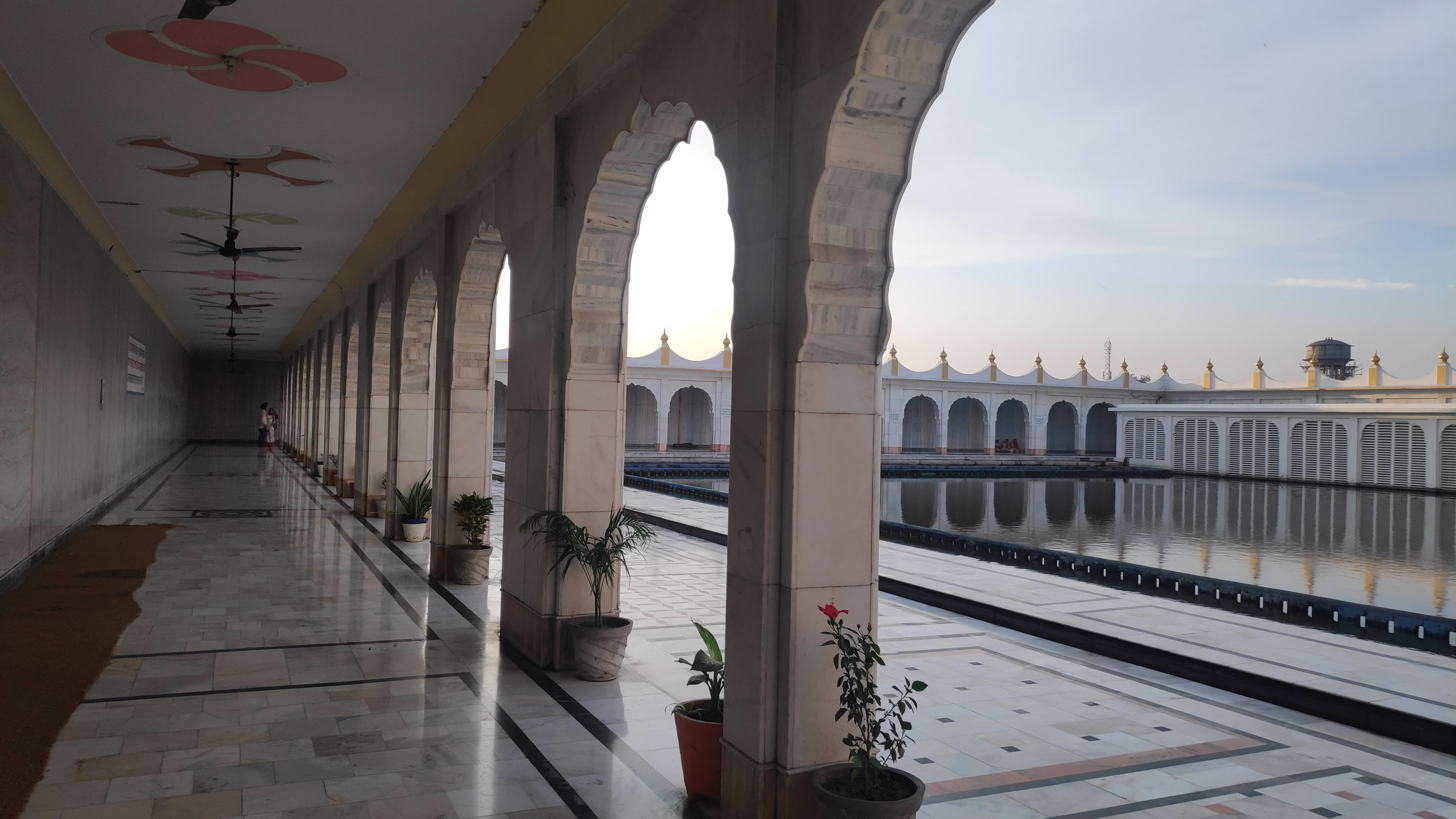
Gurudwara Chheharta Sahib Sarovar (holy pond) side view

In the modern era, Chheharta gained prominence due to the contributions of Communist Party of India leaders Satya Pal Dang and Vimla Dang, who made it their home in the early 1950s. The couple played a pivotal role in shaping Chheharta’s socio-political landscape, dedicating their lives to public welfare and justice. Satya Pal Dang served as the first president of Chheharta municipality in 1953 and went on to become a key figure in Punjab’s political history. Under Vimla Dang’s leadership, Chheharta became the first place in Punjab to establish a creche for working-class women, setting a precedent for progressive community development.

== Present ==
The town is now an industrial township with a large concentration of population. The Town attracts huge visitors on the occasion of Basant Panchmi in which the Old tradition of Kite Flying is still very common. The Crowd is enriched with people wearing yellow turbans which hold a significance to the spring festival. It is famous for Basant Panchmi which is a festival marking Spring season people living in Punjab. People from all over the Punjab visit and fly kites and offer prayers to their Guru .

== Rail ==
Cheharta Railway Station is the first railway station while going towards Attari railway station.

It is famous for its historical Gurudwara. And is the main station for import and export with Pakistan.

It has 2 platforms. One is for passengers and other one is for freight train. Government has planned to construct 2 washing lines in this railway station.

The Town is well connected to the other parts of the state, being 4 km away from the Amritsar Junction railway station. Chheharta Railway Station is the main terminal station. The Railway Station operation is confined mainly to goods trains. It is heavily used to load and unload merchandise which earns it a monthly revenue of 9 crore. The Station meet the local demands with the help of Solitary passenger train Amritsar-Chheharta-Attari and Attari-Chheharta-Amritsar. The Ministry of Railways have allocated Rs 60 crore for its infrastructure. The railway station will be developed into a satellite railway station.
