= Dedicated freight corridors in India =

Freight corridor network in India

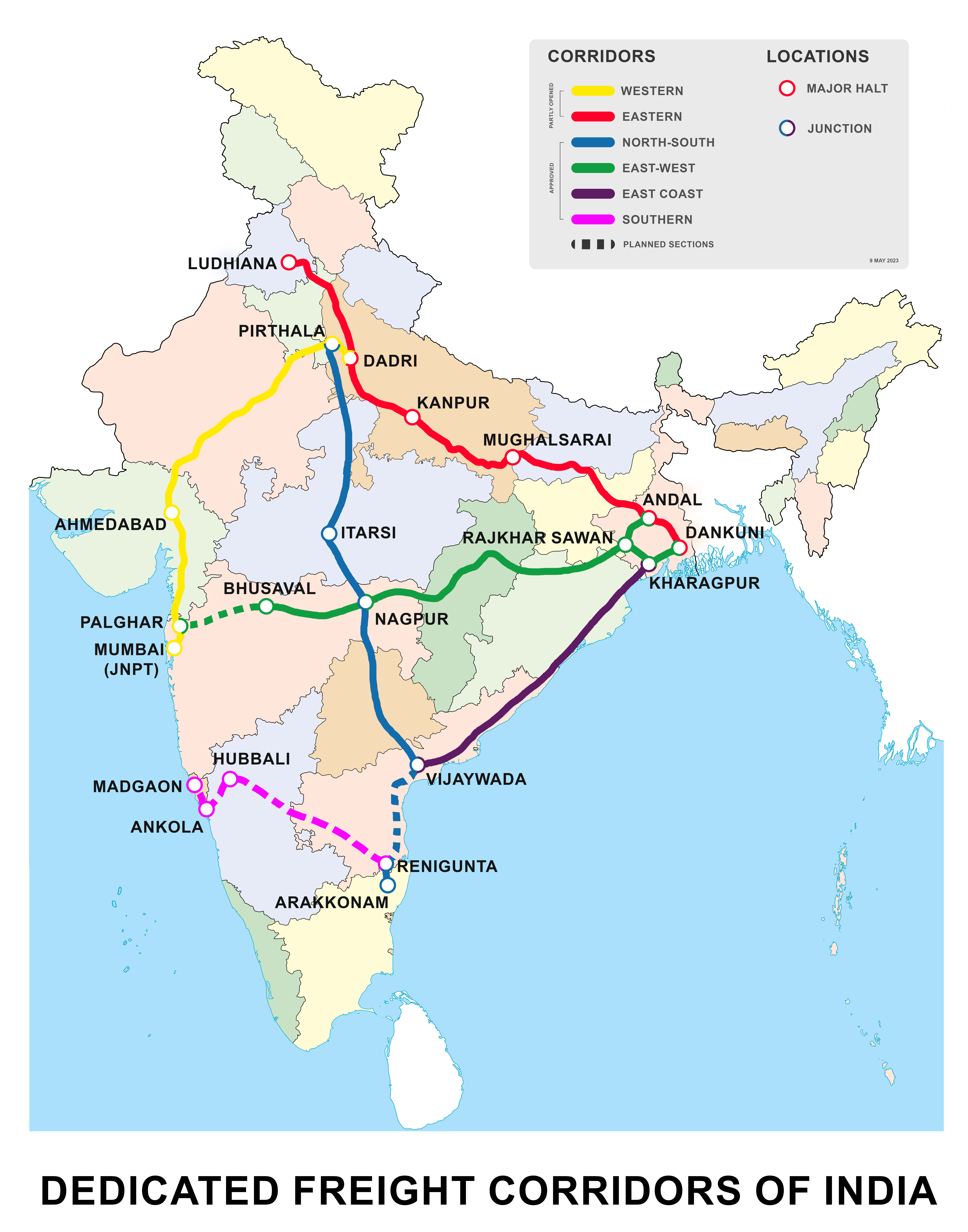
The under development dedicated freight corridor network in India.

The dedicated freight corridors in India are a network of electric broad gauge freight railway lines that solely serve freight trains, thus making the freight service in India faster and more efficient. The Dedicated Freight Corridor Corporation of India (DFCCIL) a public sector company is responsible for undertaking planning, development, mobilisation of financial resources and construction, maintenance and operation of these corridors.

In fiscal year 2024, an average of 241 trains used the dedicated freight corridors daily. The number increased nearly 70% to an average of 403 freight trains per day in fiscal year 2025.

== History ==
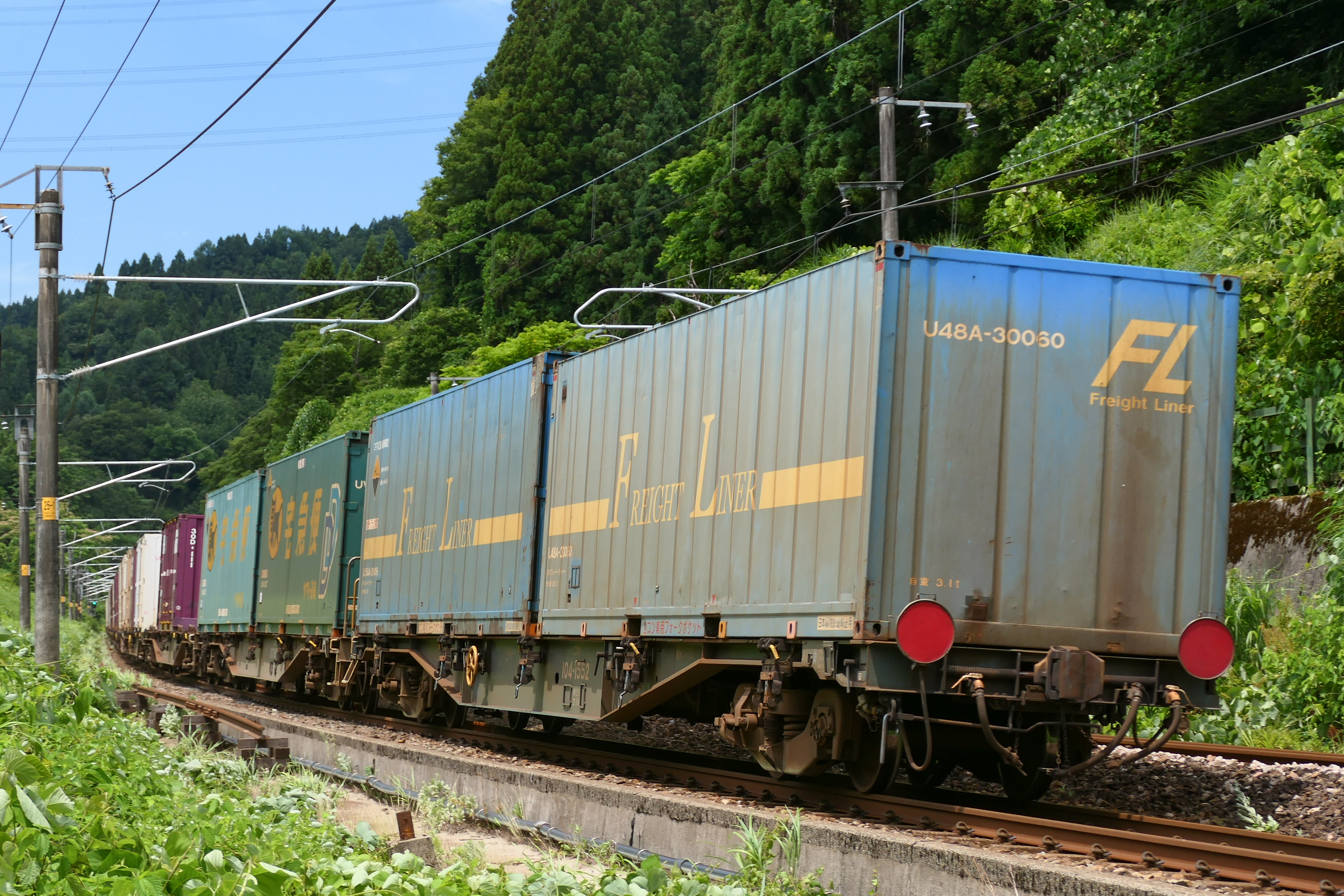
DFC is inspired by highspeed freight trains of Japan and funded by JICA.

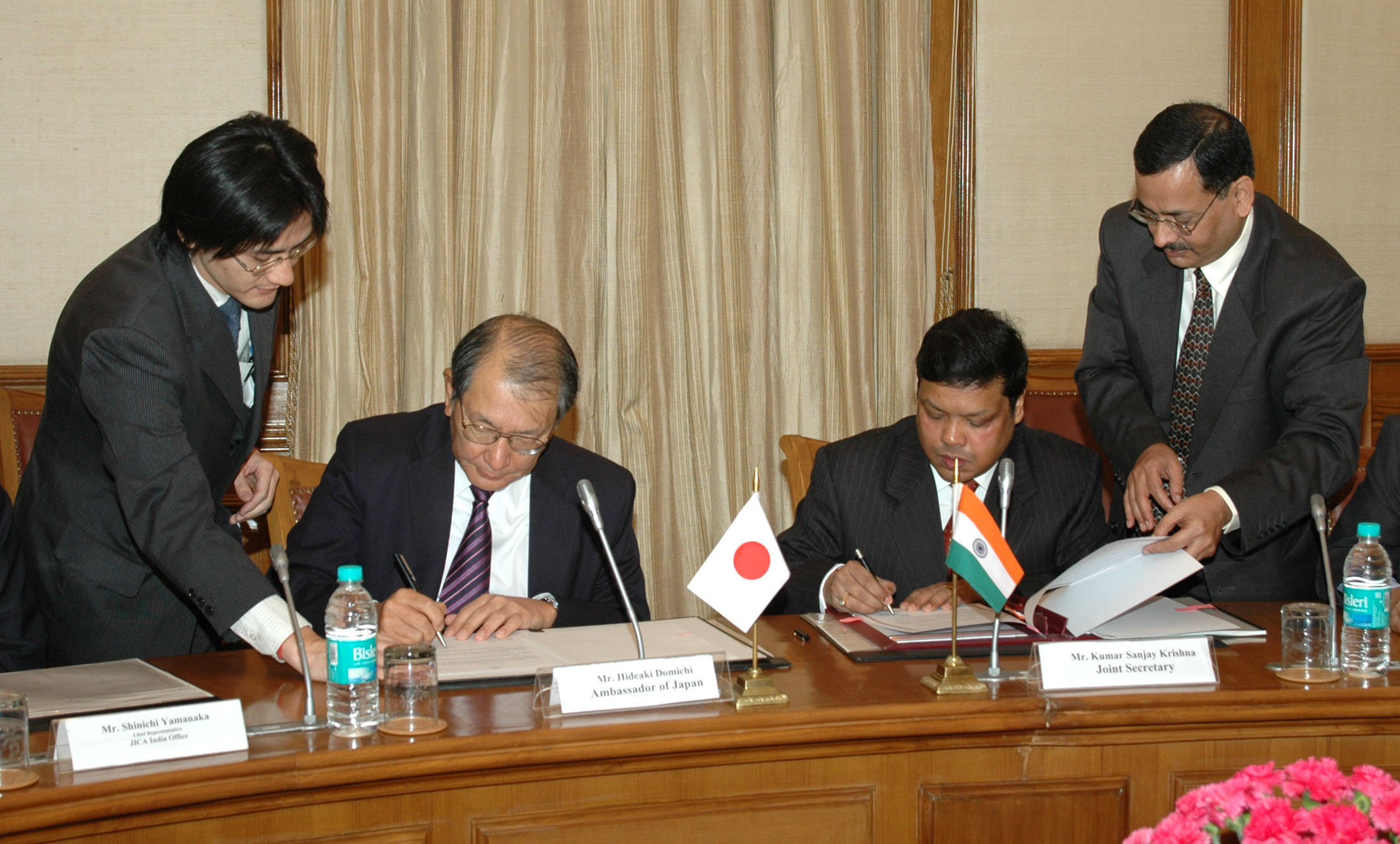
The Joint Secretary, Ministry of Finance, Kumar Sanjay Krishna and Ambassador of Japan to India, Hideaki Domichi signing Exchange of Notes for Dedicated Freight Corridor Project (Phase-1), in New Delhi on October 27, 2009

The Tenth Five Year Plan (2002–07) projected that freight traffic in India would rise from 489 million tons in 2001–02 to 624 million tons by 2006–07, growing at a rate of 5% annually. The mid-term appraisal of the Tenth Five Year Plan suggested building dedicated freight corridors (DFC) on trunk routes. The objective of the DFC was to separate freight traffic from passenger traffic on high density routes in order to improve operational efficiency, reduce cost of operation and carry higher volumes of freight traffic.

In April 2005, the government proposed building DFCs along the Golden Quadrilateral. The Committee on Infrastructure established a task force in May 2005 to prepare a concept paper on the Eastern Dedicated Freight Corridor (EDFC) and the Western Dedicated Freight Corridor (WDFC). The Ministry of Railways appointed RITES in July 2005 to conduct a feasibility and preliminary engineering cum traffic survey for both corridors. The Government also sought support from Japan for technical cooperation to assist in assessing the feasibility of the DFCs. Japan agreed to conduct a feasibility study on the project in November 2005.

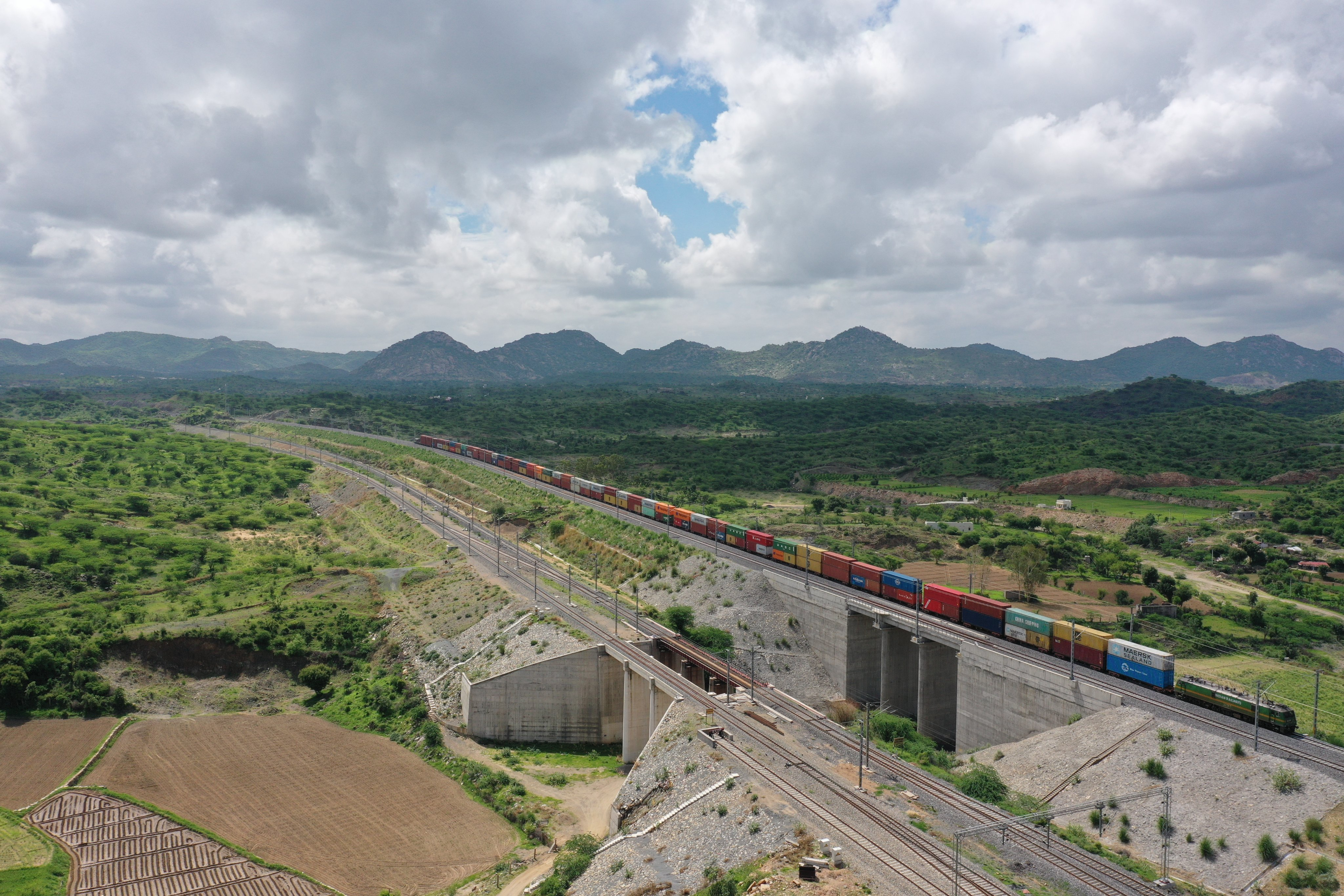
A section of DFC.

RITES submitted its feasibility report on the project in January 2006. The Union Cabinet granted in-principle approval to the project the next month. The Dedicated Freight Corridors Corporation of India Limited (DFCCIL), a public sector company to build and operate the DFCs, was incorporated on 30 October 2006. RITES submitted the preliminary engineering cum traffic survey for the project in January 2007. The Japan International Cooperation Agency (JICA) completed a feasibility study on the project in October 2007, and subsequently agreed to provide funding for the WDFC. The Ministry of Railways approached the World Bank to provide funding for the EDFC in 2008. In May 2011, the World Bank agreed to provide funds for a 1,183 km section of the EDFC connecting Ludhiana with Mughalsarai. The Union Cabinet approved both corridors in February 2008 with a target completion date of 2013.

== Construction ==
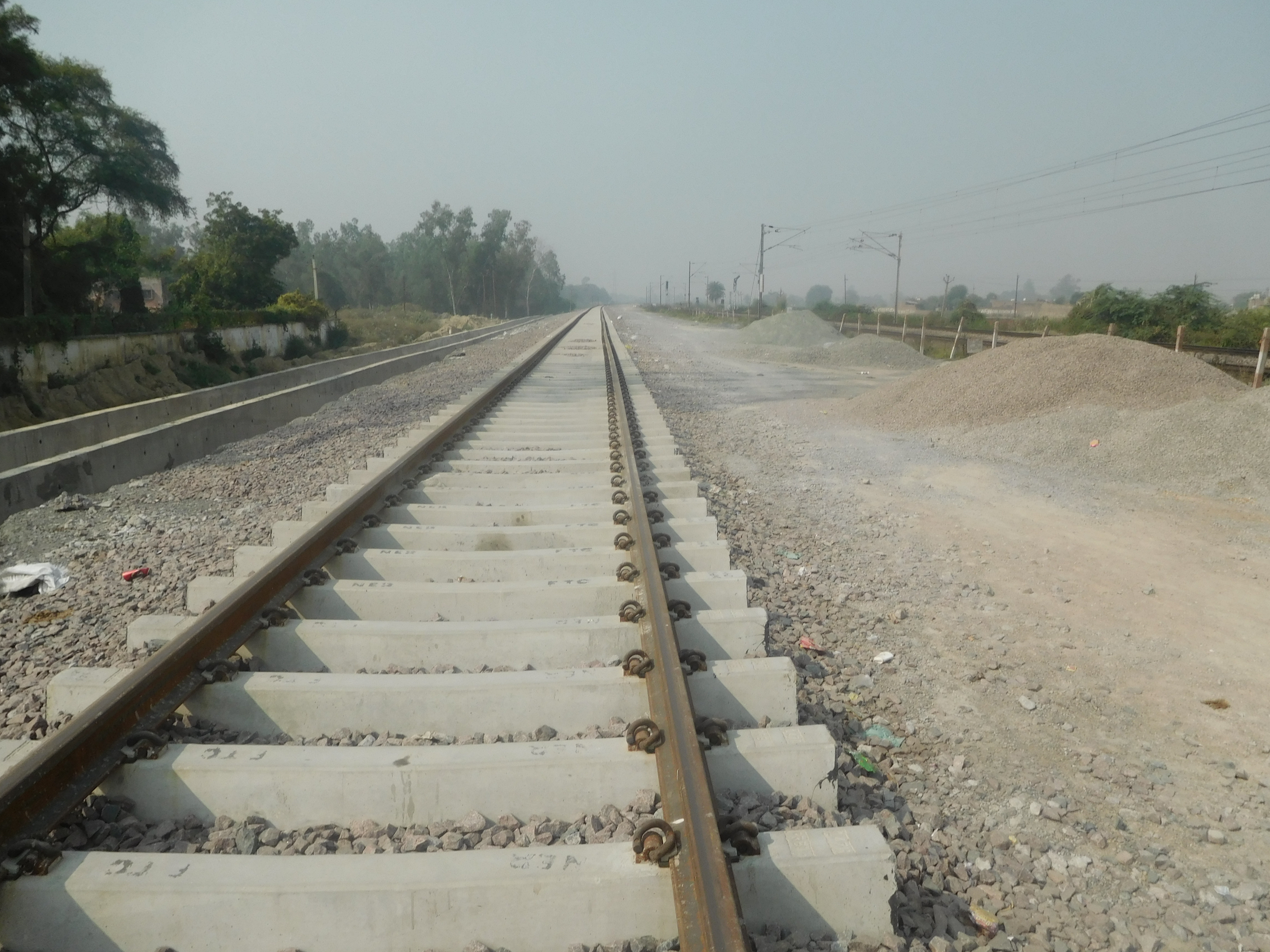
Under construction picture of Eastern dedicated freight corridor. The tracks of dedicated freight corridors in India are broad gauge.

Under the Eleventh Five Year Plan of India (2007–12), the Ministry of Railways started constructing a new Dedicated Freight Corridor (DFC) in two long routes, namely the Eastern and Western freight corridors. The two routes cover a total length of 3,260 kilometres (2,030 mi), with the Eastern Dedicated Freight Corridor stretching from Ludhiana in Punjab to Dankuni in West Bengal and the Western Dedicated Freight Corridor from Jawaharlal Nehru Port in Mumbai (Maharashtra) to Dadri in Uttar Pradesh. Upgrading of transportation technology, increase in productivity and reduction in unit transportation cost are the focus areas for the project.

The construction of Eastern Freight Corridor has been completed by February 2024. and the construction of the Western Freight Corridor has been completed by March 2026.

The Detailed Project Review (DPR) of North-South and East-Coast Freight Corridor are being prepared has been submitted whereas the DPR for East-West DFC will be submitted by April-end (2024). The combined project value is expected to be Rs. 2 lakh crore.

== Technology ==
=== Pantographs ===
In 2007, India set a world record with the indigenously designed high-rise pantograph by Stone India Ltd, developed for the use in dedicated freight corridors and other freight routes. with many other added features, such as twin catenary height of 6 and 7.5 meters, auto upward-force adjustment to improve effective current collection in adverse conditions, thereby enabling reduction in energy consumption and allowing trains to run at much higher speeds.

=== Locomotives ===
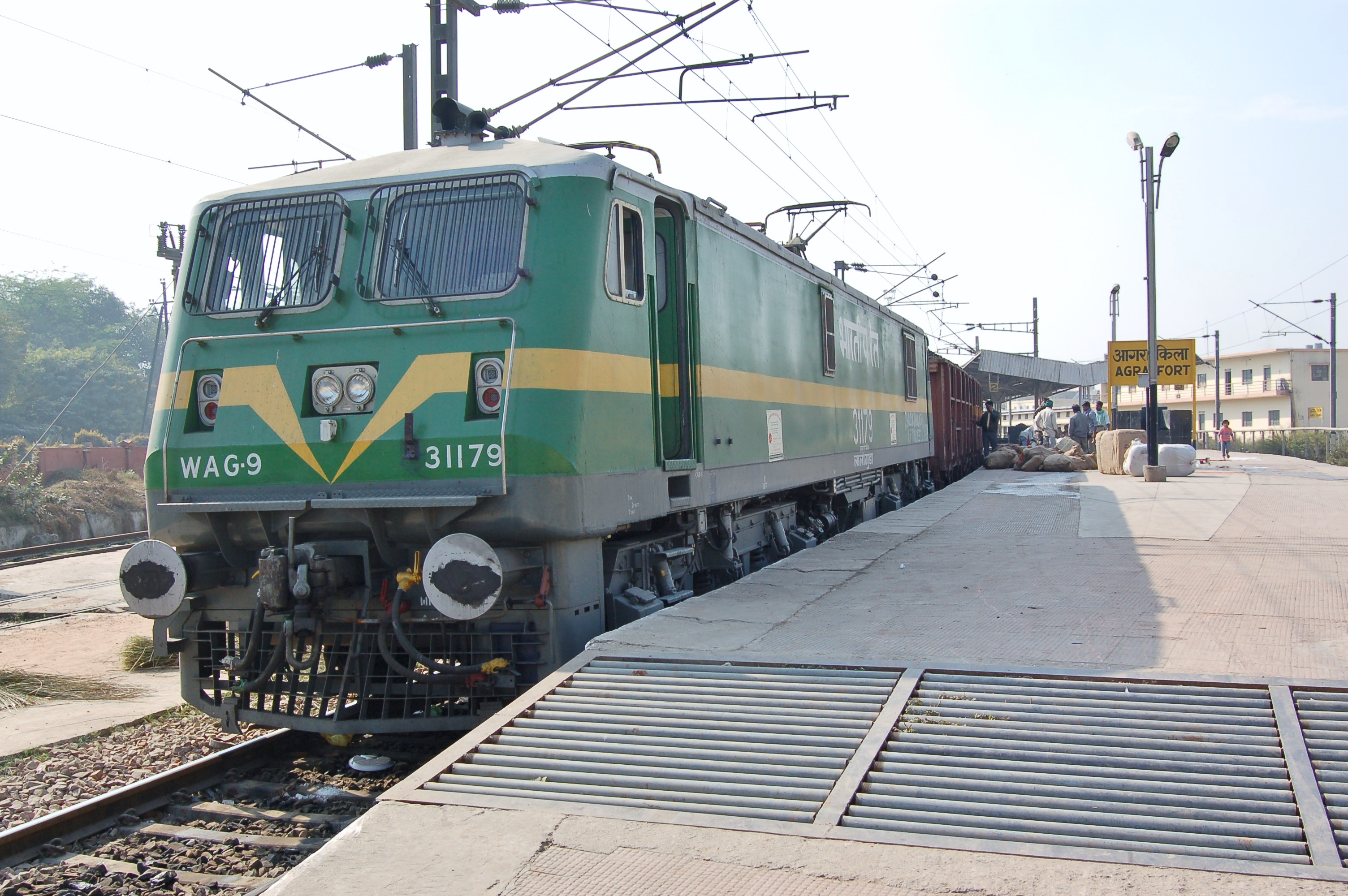
WAG-9HH locomotive carrying freight wagons

WAG-12 locomotive is a class of Indian multi-frame electric locomotive that was developed in 2017 by Alstom. With a horsepower of 12,000 hp it is one of the most powerful locomotives in the world. These locomotives are being used on the existing dedicated freight corridors. WAG-9HH locomotive is a 9000 hp single-frame electric locomotive developed by Chittaranjan Locomotive Works to be used in Western Dedicated Freight Corridor (WDFC). The WAG-9 series are quite similar to the WAP-7 class locomotive but features a different gear ratio, which makes it suitable for heavy freight operations. They are also the freight-dedicated three-phase AC locomotives in the country fitted with IGBT.

=== Tracks ===
The Eastern and Western DFCs use special head-hardened (HH) 250m-long rails welded using flash butt welding machines. The axle load of their tracks is 32.5t, compared to the existing 25t axle load used on Indian Railways' tracks.

=== Speed ===
As of December 2019, in the commissioned sections, a total of 4000 trains have been run. Some of the trains in the section are achieving the average speed of 99.38 kmph in EDFC and the average speed is 89.50 kmph in WDFC. Since its inauguration, on average 150 to 200 freight trains are running daily maintaining the average speed between 75 and 80 kmph with operational speeds of 99 kmph. DFCC officials say that their target is to increase the operation to 300 trains daily with an average speed of 90 kmph, previously trials have been completed on sections with 99 kmph not on entire route.

== Network ==
=== Summary ===
Operational
Partly opened
Approved
Proposed

Corridor	Length	Status	Start point	Termination point	Logistics hub
Eastern	1,337 km (831 mi)	Operational	Ludhiana	Dankuni	Meerut
Western	1,504 km (935 mi)	Operational	Dadri	JNPT, Nava Sheva	
East-West	2,000 km (1,200 mi)	Announced in Budget 2021–22	Dankuni	Bhusawal	
North-South	975 km (606 mi)	Announced in Budget 2021–22	Vijayawada	Itarsi	
East Coast	1,115 km (693 mi)	Announced in Budget 2021–22	Kharagpur	Vijayawada	
East-West (Dankuni Surat)	2,052 km (1275 mi)	Announced in Budget 2026–27	Dankuni	Surat	
Southern	892 km (554 mi)	Proposed	Madgaon	Chennai	
Total	7,823 km (4,861 mi)	2/6			

=== Golden Quadrilateral Freight Corridor (GQFC) ===
GQFC has six DFCs; two are being implemented and the funding for the remaining four was approved in January 2018. The rail tracks linking the four largest metropolitan cities of Delhi, Mumbai, Chennai and Kolkata, and the two diagonals of North-South Dedicated Freight Corridor (Delhi-Chennai) and East-West Dedicated Freight Corridor (Kolkata-Mumbai) are called the Golden Quadrilateral (GQFC). These carry 55% of the India Railway's freight traffic over a total 10,122 km (6,290 mi) route length. The line capacity utilisation on the existing highly saturated shared trunk routes of Howrah-Delhi on the Eastern Corridor and Mumbai-Delhi on the Western Corridor varies between 115% and 150%. The surging requirement for the power generation requiring heavy coal movement, booming infrastructure construction and growing international trade has led to the conception of the GQFCs. Carbon emission reduction from DFCs will help DFCCIL claim carbon credits.

== Impact ==
The dedicated freight corridors aim to bring down the cost of freight transport (by using electricity, longer trains with more capacity can be operated, plus the western DFC utilises double stacking to transport more containers), thus helping Indian industries to become competitive in the world export market. These corridors will also help India achieve the targets it has committed to in the Paris Climate Accords, by switching from diesel propelled freight trains and fossil fuel-based road traffic to the electricity based railway locomotives. India is growing in renewable energy production, with most of the country's new electricity generation capacity being added through solar, wind and nuclear sources.

Goods trains on the dedicated freight corridor are running at average journey speeds higher than Rajdhani trains, with one clocking a record average of 99.38 kmph. 3,077 trains ran on EDFC; the maximum speed so far was 97.85 kmph before the milestone was reached. On WDFC, the maximum speed of the 837 trains was 89.50 kmph.

The new generation pantograph allows an increase in the height of the overhead wires (catenary height) from the standard 6 meters (19 ft 8 1/4 in) to 7.45 meters (24 ft 5 1/4 in), setting the world record for the "high reach pantograph for highest catenary for electric locomotives". This will also enable Indian railways to introduce double-decker passenger trains in high-density suburban passenger route and RORO cargo service across the Indian railways network. The Indian passenger railway network will be able to run semi-high speed and high-speed trains in the existing network, as 70% of cargo traffic will migrate to the dedicated freight corridors. It will also increase the distance between track centers to 5.3 m (17 ft 5 in), allowing larger out-of-gauge trains. Only low platforms will be permissible.

The Eastern DFC may not be able to support RORO as it has height of 5.1 meters (16 ft 8 3/4 in) compared to 7.1 meters (23 ft 3 1/2 in) of the Western DFC. The Konkan Railway is the only railway zone in India that has streamlined the RORO service and is able to save 75 million litres of diesel fuel and related foreign exchange for the country. RORO services are deployed in the East Central Railway and Northeast Frontier Railway zones along with Konkan railway, but RORO has failed to be successful in existing electrical railway infrastructure because of the height of the overhead electrical wires.

=== Logistic parks ===
The Uttar Pradesh government has announced the creation of large logistic parks in Meerut and Khurja due to their proximity to the Ganga Expressway and their location on the line of the Eastern Dedicated Freight Corridor. These areas are set to become major logistical hubs, with access to key transportation networks enhancing their connectivity and facilitating efficient movement of goods.

Ashok Agarwal, national president of the Indian Industries Association (IIA), mentioned during the UP Investors Summit that numerous inquiries had been received regarding land allotment along the Ganga Expressway, particularly from investors interested in the Meerut, Budaun, and adjoining areas. This surge in interest highlights the significant potential of the region for industrial development and investment.

== See also ==
- Freight transport
- Transport in India
  - Rail transport in India
    - List of railway lines in India
    - High-speed rail in India
    - Urban rail transit in India
    - RapidX
    - List of high-speed railway lines in India
  - Multi-Modal Logistics Parks in India
  - Aerial lift in India
  - Bus rapid transit in India
- Future of rail transport in India
- Amrit Bharat Station Scheme
