= Eastern Dedicated Freight Corridor =

Dedicated freight corridor in India

Overview
- Status: Fully operational
- Owner: DFCCIL
- Locale: Punjab, Haryana, Uttar Pradesh, Bihar, Jharkhand and West Bengal
- Termini: Ludhiana, Punjab; Dankuni, West Bengal

Service
- Type: Freight rail
- System: DFCCIL
- Operator: Indian Railways

History
- Planned opening: June 2023; 3 years ago
- Completed: February 2024

Technical
- Line length: 1,839 km (1,143 mi)
- Track gauge: 5 ft 6 in (1,676 mm) Indian broad gauge
- Electrification: 25 kV 50 Hz AC overhead catenary

Eastern Dedicated Freight Corridor or Eastern DFC is a broad gauge freight corridor in India. The railway line runs between Ludhiana in Punjab and Dankuni (near Kolkata) in West Bengal via Meerut and Kanpur in Uttar Pradesh. This railway line is one of the multiple freight corridors being constructed by the Dedicated Freight Corridor Corporation of India (DFCCIL), a public-sector unit (PSU) under the Ministry of Railways.

== Logistics hub and network ==
A large logistics hub is proposed in Meerut, which is well connected to EDFC and several expressways.

The Eastern DFC will mostly have double tracks and will be electrified, but the section from Ludhiana to Khurja (365 km) will be single line electrified due to lack of space. This freight corridor will cover a total distance of 1,839 km. This corridor is having a 46 km branch line which is joining Khurja (Bulandshahr district) on the Eastern DFC with Dadri (Gautam Buddha Nagar district) on the Western Dedicated Freight Corridor (Western DFC).

As of August 2023, 1150 km or 86% of the Eastern DFC has been completed and 99% required land for these have been acquired. First two DFCs, Western DFC, from Dadri, Uttar Pradesh to JNPT (Navi Mumbai) and Eastern DFC from Punjab to West Bengal, which will decongest the railway network by moving 70% of India's goods trains to these two corridors.

== Route ==
The freight corridor will cover first 447 km of Ludhiana - Dhari - Khurja section with single electrified track. After this the remaining line will be double track electrified up to Dankuni in West Bengal. This will pass through the important districts of Sahnewal, Doraha, Ludhiana, Sirhind, Rajpura, Ambala, Yamunanagar, Saharanpur, Muzaffarnagar, Meerut (Logistic Hub), Hapur, Bulandshahr, Aligarh, Hathras, Barhan, Tundla, Firozabad, Etawah, Kanpur, Prayagraj and Chandauli. To reduce load over the main line, this line will have many junctions. The proposed junctions on this line are Dhandharikalan, Sirhind, Rajpura, Khalanaur, Khurja, Daudkhan, Tundla, Bhaupur, Prempur, Manauri, Karchhana, Jeonathpur, Mughalsarai Junction railway station, Ganjkhwaja, Sasaram, Dehri On Sone, Son Nagar, Gomoh, Andal, Bardhaman and Dankuni (The eastern terminal point).

Eastern DFC
State	Distance Covered
Punjab	88
Haryana	72
Uttar Pradesh	1076
Bihar	236
Jharkhand	199
West Bengal	202
Total	1873

== Logistic hub ==
A large logistic hub is also proposed in Meerut, since the city is suitable major hub due to its well connectivity and proximity with expressways like Delhi–Meerut Expressway, Delhi–Dehradun Expressway, Ganga Expressway, Delhi–Mumbai Expressway, Yamuna Expressway and upcoming Meerut Haridwar Expressway.

The land around the departure points of Meerut, from where the expressway is to start, will be developed for industries.

Ashok Agarwal, national president, Indian Industries Association (IIA), said "We have also received queries related to the allotment of land along the Ganga Expressway from investors. Most of the queries are for land in Meerut, Budaun and its adjoining areas".

Government proposed following investment zones -

- Meerut along Delhi Meerut Expressway
- Meerut Muzaffarnagar Investment region
- Dadri Noida Ghaziabad Investment Region

== Construction ==
This corridor is divided into multiple sections for contracting purposes.

Eastern DFC
Section	Distance in km	Route	Status	Project contractor	Completion Date
Ludhiana - Khurja	365	Ludhiana-Ambala-Yamunanagar-Saharanpur-Muzaffarnagar-Meerut-Hapur-Bulandshahr-Khurja	Operational	GMR Group	2023 August
Dadri - Khurja (branch line)	46	Dadri-Khurja	Operational	GMR Group	2022 October
Khurja - Bhaupur	351	Khurja-Aligarh-Hathras-Tundla-Etawah-Bhaupur	Operational	Tata Projects India- Aldesa Group	2020 December
Bhaupur - Manauri - New Ganjkhwaja	279	Bhaupur-Prempur-Manauri (near Prayagraj)-Chheoki East/ Karchhana west (near Prayagraj) - New Ganjkhwaja	Operational	GMR Group	2023 June
New Ganjkhwaja - New Chiraila Pauthu	123	New Ganjkhwaja - Pt Deen Dayal Upadhyay Nagar - New Chiraila Pauthu	Operational	GMR Group	2021 July
New Chiraila Pauthu - Sonnagar	137	New Chiraila Pauthu - Dehri On Sone-Sonnagar	Operational	C&C Construction Gurgaon and BSCPL	2021 December
Sonnagar - Dankuni	375	Sonnagar- Andal (Phase - I)	Operational		
Sonnagar - Dankuni	163	Andal – Dankuni (Phase - II)	Dropped		
Total	1839				

== Operations control center (OCC) ==
Built by Alstom at Prayagraj, OCC will house command and control center to monitor all trains and power supply systems on Eastern Dedicated Freight Corridor. It will be staffed by 150 people and the facility is spread across 4.2 acres. Latest Map from DFCCIL: https://dfccil.com/images/uploads/img/MapDFC_NIZC.png

== Status updates ==
- Apr 2005: The project is announced by the then Prime Minister of India Manmohan Singh.
- Oct 2006: The Dedicated Freight Corridor Corporation of India (DFCCIL) is formed by the Ministry of Railways on 30 October.
- Feb 2008: The Cabinet Committee on Economic Affairs (CCEA) approves the Western DFC and the Eastern DFC.
- Sep 2009: The Union Cabinet approved a JICA loan.
- 2018-19: DFC is revived by the Union government after a decade of inactivity, with a target of going live by March 2023. However, the COVID crisis stalls the project's progress, and the timelines are shifted by a year. A major part of the project becomes operational by 2023.
- Jun 2023: 77% of the DFC is completed and the project is set to be completed by the end of 2023.
- Oct 2023: The last leg of the Eastern DFC underwent a successful trial run. With this, the line is completed to Son Nagar.
- Feb 2024: Construction has been completed.
- Apr 2024: Fully operational

== See also ==
- Dedicated freight corridors in India
  - Western Dedicated Freight Corridor
  - East–West Dedicated Freight Corridor
  - North–South Dedicated Freight Corridor
  - East Coast Dedicated Freight Corridor
  - Dedicated Freight Corridor Corporation of India
- High-speed rail in India
