= Dadri (disambiguation) =

Dadri is a town in Uttar Pradesh, India. It could also refer to the following places:

- Dadri (Uttar Pradesh Assembly constituency), the assembly constituency encompassing the town.
- Dadri railway station, the town's railway station
- Dadri (Haryana Vidhan Sabha constituency), an assembly constituency in Haryana, India
