= KRJ =

KRJ or krj may refer to:

- KRJ, the Indian Railways station code for Khurja Junction railway station, Uttar Pradesh, India
- krj, the ISO 639-3 code for Karay-a language, Philippines
