= Western Dedicated Freight Corridor =

Railroad connecting Delhi and Mumbai

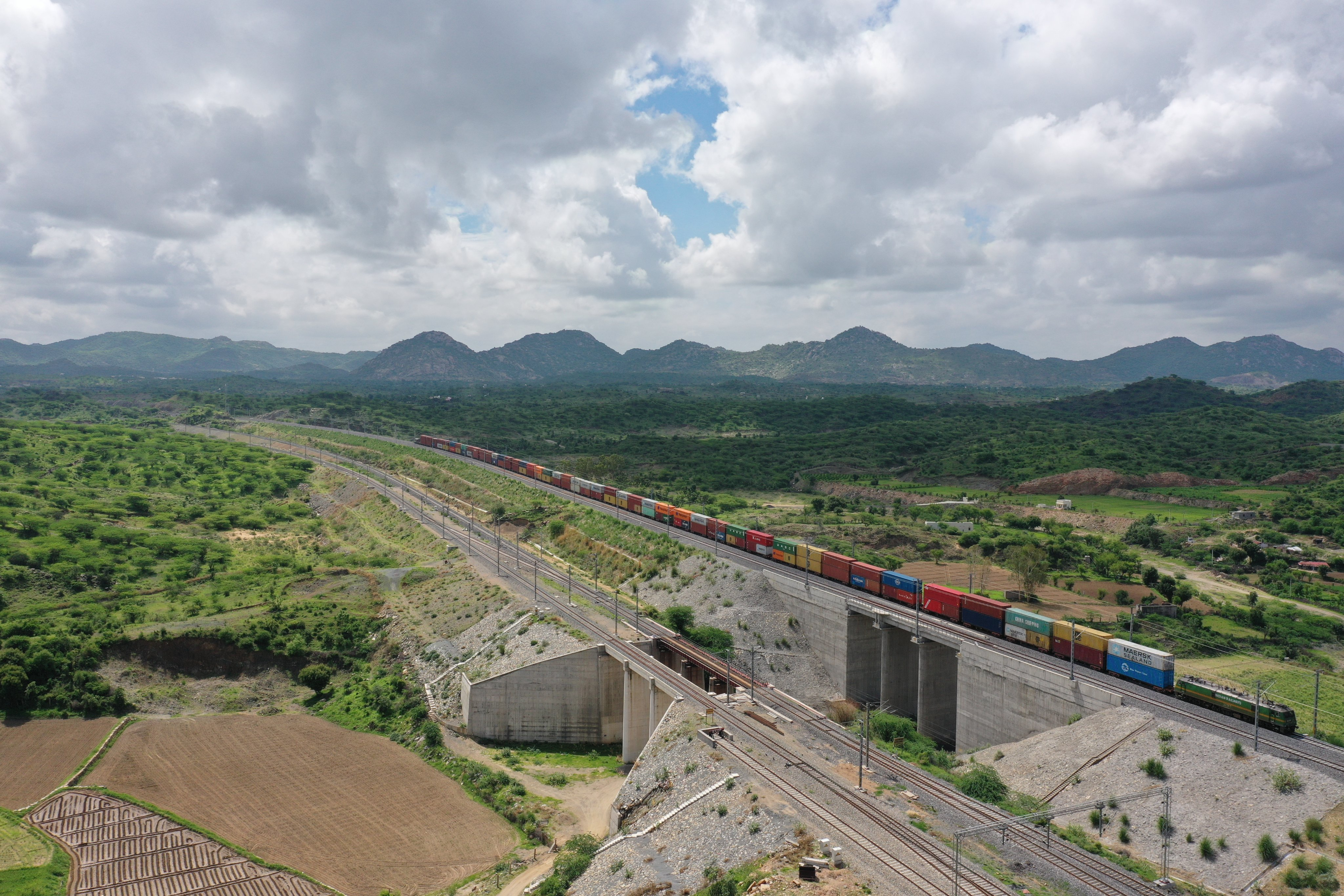
- A freight train carrying double stack containers is running on the Western Dedicated Freight Corridor (WDFC).

Overview
- Status: Operational
- Owner: DFCCIL
- Locale: Delhi, Uttar Pradesh, Haryana, Rajasthan, Gujarat and Maharashtra
- Termini: North: Dadri, Uttar Pradesh; South: JNPT, Navi Mumbai, Maharashtra

Service
- Type: Freight rail
- System: DFCCIL
- Operator: DFCCIL
- Rolling stock: WAG-9, WAG-12

History
- Planned opening: March 2024; 2 years ago
- Completed: March 2026

Technical
- Line length: 1,506 km (936 mi)
- Track gauge: 5 ft 6 in (1,676 mm) Indian broad gauge
- Electrification: 25 kV 50 Hz AC overhead catenary

Route of Western Dedicated Freight Corridor

The Western Dedicated Freight Corridor or Western DFC is a 1,676 mm (5 ft 6 in) freight corridor in India stretching 1,506 km. It runs between Dadri in Uttar Pradesh (near Delhi) and the Jawaharlal Nehru Port in Navi Mumbai, Raigad District, Maharashtra. The corridor has been developed by the Dedicated Freight Corridor Corporation of India Limited (DFCCIL), a public-sector undertaking (PSU) under the Ministry of Railways, and has double-line electrified operation. It also includes a new single-line branch connecting Prithla in Palwal district to Tughlakabad in Delhi, running parallel to the existing New Delhi–Faridabad–Palwal railway line.

The Western DFC is dedicated exclusively to freight, operating at higher speeds and with greater load-carrying capacity than conventional lines. The primary commodities it will carry include fertilizers, food grains, salt, coal, iron, steel, and cement. It uses Flash Butt Welded head-hardened (HH) rails in 250 m lengths, with an axle load capacity of 25 t on tracks and 32.5 t on bridges — an improvement over the 22.9 t to 25 t axle loads used on existing Indian Railways tracks. The line will accommodate freight trains up to 1,500 m (4,900 ft) long, hauled by high-power WAG-12 electric locomotives at speeds exceeding 100 km/h (62 mph). The tracks will be fully grade-separated and feature a generous loading gauge of 3,660 mm (12 ft 1/8 in) in width and 7,100 mm (23 ft 3 1/2 in) in maximum height, enabling double-stacked shipping containers to be carried on flatcars — unlike in most other countries, where well cars are required for double-stack rail transport. This allows a single train to carry up to 400 containers. Trains will also be equipped with radio communications and GSM-based tracking — a first for the Indian railway sector.

The Eastern Dedicated Freight Corridor (Eastern DFC) includes a 46 km branch line connecting Khurja in Bulandshahr district on the Eastern DFC with Dadri in Gautam Buddha Nagar district on the Western DFC.

Meerut has been proposed as the largest logistics hub on the Eastern DFC, owing to its strong connectivity via several expressways. Together with the Delhi–Mumbai Expressway, the Western DFC will form a key backbone of the Delhi–Mumbai Industrial Corridor (DMIC). The Western DFC will intersect the Delhi–Mumbai Expressway at two points in Haryana: Sancholi village in Gurgaon district, and Paroli village in Palwal district.

With the JNPT–New Saphale (Vaitarna) section coming into operation, DFCCIL announced the completion of the Western Dedicated Freight Corridor, marking the country’s second Dedicated Freight Corridor as complete on March 31st 2026. The Eastern Dedicated Freight Corridor (EDFC) was completed earlier, in October 2023.

== About DFC ==
The Government of India established the Dedicated Freight Corridor Corporation of India (DFCCIL) on 30 October 2006 to undertake construction of this project.

India's first 2 DFCs, the Western Dedicated Freight Corridor from Dadri in Uttar Pradesh to Navi Mumbai in Maharashtra and the Eastern Dedicated Freight Corridor (Eastern DFC) from Ludhiana in Punjab to Dankuni in West Bengal, via Meerut (Logistic Hub) and Khurja are aimed at decongesting the railway network by moving 70% of India's goods trains to these two corridors.

== Route ==
The Western Dedicated Freight Corridor (Western DFC) will begin at Dadri in Uttar Pradesh (near Delhi) on a new stretch of railway line right of way between Dadri-Rewari and then will run parallel to existing railway lines via Narnaul, Sri Madhopur and Reengus (Sikar). The other important stations will be Phulera and Marwar Junction in Rajasthan, Palanpur, Ambli Road Railway Station near (Sabarmati), Makarpura (Vadodara), Gothangam/ Kosad in Gujarat and Vasai Road in Maharashtra before it terminates at JNPT (Nhava Sheva Port) in Maharashtra's Raigad district. The Dadri-Rewari railway line passes through a 1 km tunnel with 14.5 m width and internal height 10.5 m to 12.5 m to carry double-stacked containers.

Western DFC
State	Distance Covered
Haryana	177
Rajasthan	567
Gujarat	565
Maharashtra	177
Uttar Pradesh	18
Total	1504

== Construction ==
The DFCCIL has divided the construction work of the Western DFC into 5 section for contracting purposes.

Western DFC
Section	Distance	Route	Status	Project contractor	Completion Date
Dadri – Rewari	127	Dadri-Prithla-Rewari (Branch line: Prithla-Palwal and Prithla-Asaoti)	Operational	L&T-Sojitz consortium	2023 June
Rewari - Madar	306	Rewari-Phulera (near Jaipur)-Ajmer-	Operational	L&T-Sojitz consortium	2021 January
Madar -Palanpur	353	Marwar-Palanpur	Operational	L&T-Sojitz consortium	2021 March
Palanpur -Vadodara	299	Palanpur-Mehsana-Ambli Road (near Ahmedabad)-Vadodara	Operational	L&T-Sojitz-Gayatri Projects consortium	2024 March
Vadodara – Sachin	135	Makarpura (Vadodara)-Sachin (near Surat)	Operational	Mitsui-IRCON-Tata Projects consortium	2023 August
Sachin – JNPT	295	Sachin (near Surat)-Valsad-Vasai Road-Jawaharlal Nehru Port	Operational	Mitsui-IRCON-Tata Projects consortium	2026 March
Total	1,504				

== Status Updates ==
- Apr 2005: The project is announced by the then Prime Minister of India Manmohan Singh.
- Oct 2006: The Dedicated Freight Corridor Corporation of India (DFCCIL) is formed by the Ministry of Railways on 30 October.
- Feb 2008: The Cabinet Committee on Economic Affairs (CCEA) approves the Western DFC and the Eastern DFC.
- Sep 2009: The Union Cabinet approved a loan made by the Japan International Cooperation Agency (JICA).
- Jun 2013: The civil construction contract for the Rewari-Palanpur section is awarded by DFCCIL.
- Aug 2018: The inaugural run of a freight train is successfully conducted along the 190 km segment between the New Ateli and the New Phulera stations.
- Dec 2019: DFCCIL successfully tested the 306 km stretch between Kishangarh Balawas (Rewari district) and Madar (Ajmer district).
- Jul 2020: Testing for the 352.7 km Madar to Palanpur stretch was completed.
- Jan 2021: Prime Minister Narendra Modi inaugurated the 306 km route from New Rewari to New Madar and flagged off the world's first flat wagon double-stacked container train from New Ateli to New Kishangarh on 7 January.
- Mar 2021: The 335 km long New Madar to New Palanpur section is inaugurated on 31 March.
- July 2021: About 60% of the Western DFC has been completed.
- Aug 2021
  - 14 Aug: DFCCIL commences Roll-on-Roll-off (Ro-Ro) service on the Western DFC. The rake consisting of flat wagons proceeded from New Rewari and arrived at New Palanpur, covering a distance of 630 km.
  - 26 Aug: DFCCIL successfully completes a 2.75 km long and 25 m high viaduct near Sohna on the Dadri-Prithla-Rewari section.
- May 2022: A trial run was started on the section from New Palanpur to New Mehsana on 13 May and was finished on 25 May.
- Jun 2022: After the trial run, the New Palanpur-New Mehsana is inaugurated and made operational by DFCCIL, which increases the corridor's length to 720 km, from Dadri to Mehsana.
- Apr 2024: 93% of the route operational, with the 138 km Sanand-Makarpura and 244 km Makarpura-Gholvad sections opened, and the 110 km Gholvad-JNPT section the last one under construction.
- Dec 2025: The 30 km stretch from Vaitarna to new kharbao is almost finished with only electrification and signaling work remaining.
  - On 31 December, railway officials conducted a trial run on the freshly laid track between Vaitarna and JNPT. Project completion stands at around 91%.
- January 2026: While track-laying work on the stretch has been completed and earlier challenges related to land acquisition and encroachments have been resolved, commissioning has been held up due to pending signaling and overhead electrification (OHE) works. New deadline given for completion of the final leg of this project is March 2026.
- February 2026: Track laying work up to JNPT is complete and momentum testing is underway. Signaling and electrification work on the final stretch is progressing.
- On March 31, 2026:, a trial run on the newly electrified double-line stretch between Jawaharlal Nehru Port Terminal (JNPT) and Vaitarna (New Saphale) in the Mumbai Metropolitan Region was conducted. With this section operational, DFCCIL has announced the successful completion and commissioning of the Western Dedicated Freight Corridor.
- On September 8, 2026: Prime Minister Narendra Modi formally dedicated the fully completed Western Dedicated Freight Corridor — spanning 1,506 kilometers from Dadri, Uttar Pradesh to JNPT, Navi Mumbai at a cost of ₹73,000 crore — to the nation, bringing closure to a two-decade infrastructure project first proposed by Prime Minister Atal Bihari Vajpayee and completing both the Eastern and Western DFCs together.

== See also ==
- Dedicated freight corridors in India
  - Eastern Dedicated Freight Corridor
  - East–West Dedicated Freight Corridor
  - North–South Dedicated Freight Corridor
  - East Coast Dedicated Freight Corridor
- Future of rail transport in India
- High-speed rail in India
- Mumbai–Ahmedabad high-speed rail corridor
