= East Coast Dedicated Freight Corridor =

Railway corridor in India

Overview
- Status: Proposed
- Owner: Indian Railways
- Termini: Kharagpur, West Bengal; Vijayawada, Andhra Pradesh

Service
- Type: Freight rail
- Operator: Indian Railways

Technical
- Line length: 1,100 km (680 mi)
- Track gauge: 5 ft 6 in (1,676 mm) Indian broad gauge

East Coast Dedicated Freight Corridor or East Coast DFC is a proposed freight specific railway in India under the Special Purpose Vehicle (SPV). It will be constructed by Dedicated Freight Corridor Corporation of India (DFCCIL) of Indian Railways. It is going to be a broad gauge double line-electrified corridor. This corridor will cover a total distance of 1,100 km (680 mi). This corridor will run from Kharagpur in West Bengal to Vijayawada in Andhra Pradesh. The total cost of the project would be around ₹44,000 crore (US$6 billion).

There is an economic significance of this project. This route shall connect the Visakhapatnam port and runs through the mineral-rich regions of Odisha and Bengal. In addition to other commodities like steel, the target industry covers the transfer of coal, fertilizer, and iron ore.

== See also ==
- Dedicated freight corridors in India
  - Eastern Dedicated Freight Corridor
  - Western Dedicated Freight Corridor
  - East–West Dedicated Freight Corridor
  - North–South Dedicated Freight Corridor
