= North–South Dedicated Freight Corridor =

Proposed railway in India

The North–South Dedicated Freight Corridor or North-South DFC is a proposed freight-specific railway connecting New Delhi and Chennai. The approximate length of the corridor is 2,343 km with 43 proposed stations. Ministry of Railways has assigned Dedicated Freight Corridor Corporation of India (DFCCIL) to undertake Preliminary Engineering & Traffic Survey (PETS) for four additional corridors:

- East–West Corridor (Kolkata–Mumbai): 2,330 km
- North–South Corridor (Delhi-Chennai): 2,343 km
- East Coast Corridor (Kharagpur–Vijayawada): 1,100 km
- Southern Corridor (Chennai–Goa): 899 km

It was announced by then railway minister Suresh Prabhu, while presenting the Railway Budget of India 2016-17. The estimated project cost is US$13 Billion. The Government has indicated that they are likely to use a foreign direct investment for funding the project. The project would be undertaken through Public Private Partnerships (PPP) model.

== See also ==
- Dedicated freight corridors in India
  - Eastern Dedicated Freight Corridor
  - Western Dedicated Freight Corridor
  - East–West Dedicated Freight Corridor
