= Khurja Junction railway station =

Railway station in Uttar Pradesh, India

Khurja Junction
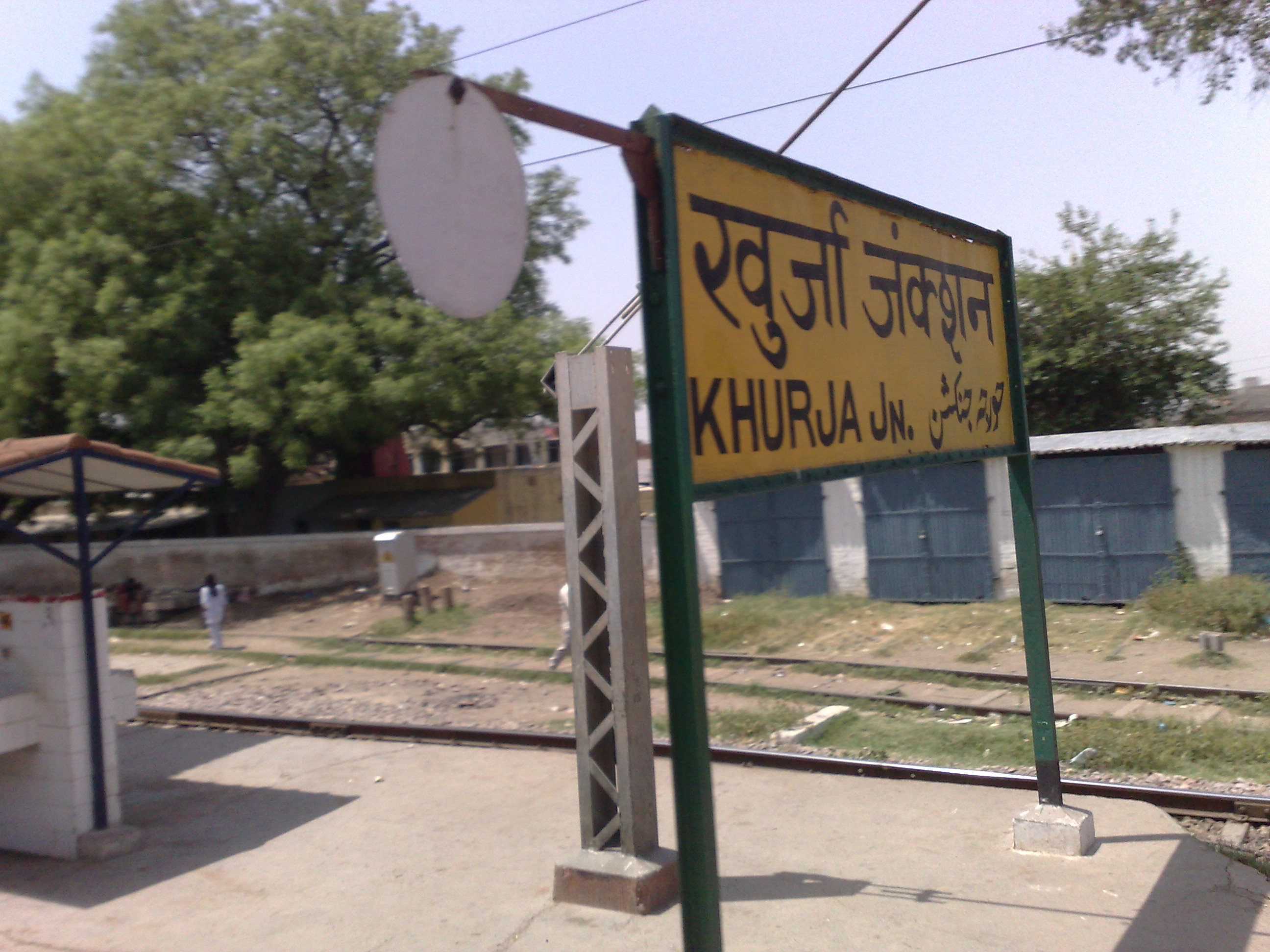
- Indian Railways logo

General information
- Location: Maina Mojpur, Bulandshahr, Uttar Pradesh
- Coordinates: 28.2078°N 77.8181°E
- Elevation: 199.00 metres (652.89 ft)
- System: Indian Railways station
- Owner: Ministry of Railways, Indian Railways
- Lines: Delhi–Aligarh, Khurja Jn–Meerut
- Platforms: 5
- Connections: Prayagraj

Construction
- Structure type: Standard on-ground station
- Parking: Yes

Other information
- Station code: KRJ
- Fare zone: North Central Railways
Location
- Location within India Location within Uttar Pradesh

Khurja Junction railway station is a railway station at Khurja in Bulandshahr district on the North Central Railway network. It is a station on the New Delhi–Aligarh–Kanpur main line.

== Dedicated Freight Corridor (DFC) ==
Dadri railway station on the Western Dedicated Freight Corridor (Western DFC) will be connected with Khurja railway station on the Eastern Dedicated Freight Corridor (Eastern DFC) via a 46 km long branch line, for movement of freight trains only. Both DFCs are under-construction.

== Routes ==
The Delhi–Meerut–Saharanpur line passes through here. The following NCR's dedicated freight corridor will pass through here:

- Panipat–Rohtak line, via Panipat–Gohana–Rohtak, existing
- Rewari–Rohtak line, via Rohtak–Jhajjar–Rewari, existing
- Rewari–Khurja line, via Rewari–Palwal–Bhiwadi–Khurja, new rail line, survey completed
- Khurja–Meerut line, via Khurja–Bulandshahr–Hapur–Meerut, existing
- Meerut–Panipat line, new rail line, survey completed
