= Electric Locomotive Factory, Madhepura =

Locomotive factory in India

Coordinates: 25°54′00″N 86°45′15″E

Madhepura Electric Locomotive Private Limited
- MELPL logo.
- Type: Mixed-ownership enterprise
- Industry: Electric locomotives
- Founded: 20 November 2015; 10 years ago
- Key people: Vijay Sharma (Director)
- Products: WAG-12B
- Production output: 300 (March 2023)
- Owner: Alstom SA (74% equity) & Ministry of Railways (26% equity)

The Electric Locomotive Factory, Madhepura is a joint venture of Alstom SA of France with Indian Railways for the production of 800 high-power locomotives over a period of 11 years designed to run on Indian tracks at 120 km/h (75 mph). The manufacturing has started on 11 October 2017.

The company's Madhepura facility is spread across 250 acres (100 ha) and currently employs 70 people. It plans to ramp up production by 25% every year till it full capacity is reached. Alstom says its first locomotive will be ready for roll-out early 2019.

On 10 April 2018, Prime Minister Narendra Modi dedicated India's first high-speed WAG-12 12,000 hp (8.9 MW) freight electric locomotive at Electric Locomotive Factory, Madhepura. The first five locomotives will be completed by 2019 followed by 35 locomotives by 2020, 60 in 2021, and by 100 every year till the target of 800 is reached.

Indian Railways got its 50th locomotive delivered by December 2020 and 100th locomotive by May 2021.

The company also completed setting-up two maintenance depots at Saharanpur in Uttar Pradesh and Nagpur in Maharashtra.

== Location ==
The factory is located at Madhepura, a city and municipality of Bihar which got its existence as an independent revenue district on 9 May 1981. Madhepura is located on the banks of river Kosi which is one of the largest tributaries of the Ganges. It consists of 13 divisional blocks. It is surrounded by six districts of Bihar and has got a good road connectivity via NH 107 and railway connectivity via Saharsa Junction and Purnia Junction.

During Sep 2013, the Ministry of Railways had received bids from six global firms: Siemens, Alstom, Bombardier, General Electric, CSR Corp and CNR Corp. However, Indian Railways rejected the bid of both Chinese firms (CSR and CNR) for the two giant manufacturing projects in Bihar.

In January 2014, the Union Cabinet gave its approval for setting up ELF Madhepura and DLF Marhowra at an approximate cost of INR 1293.57 crore and INR 2052.58 crore respectively.

In September 2015, first major FDI offer in railway was when three global infrastructure giants - Siemens, Alstom and Bombardier bid for setting up ELF Madhepura at the cost of nearly INR 1300 crore on a joint venture basis with Indian Railways. However, French major Alstom emerged as the lowest bidder for the setting up, production and procurement of electric locomotives in Madhepura, Bihar.

In November 2015, the Ministry of Railways awarded the contracts for Madhepura project and Marhowra project to Alstom and General Electric respectively in a collective amount of USD 6 billion. This multi crore rupees deal was seen as the country's first FDI in the railway sector.

In December 2015, Indian Railways issued the Letters of Award to both the companies to establish diesel and electric locomotive factories in Bihar. French PM Francois Hollande's visit to India in January 2016 has made this project sharper to execute.

After the allocation of 275 acres (111 ha) of land to Alstom, the ground breaking ceremony was held secretly in March 2016. Although, land acquisition was sometimes tense, construction of the factory began in July 2016.

== Project ==
After all ups and downs, the ELF Madhepura project kick-started from July 2016. As soon as the construction begins, it took 3 years to complete and the plant is ready for production from 2019.

Under the joint venture of Indian Railways and Alstom, the factory is scheduled to manufacture and supply 800 electric locomotives of 12000 HP within a period of 11 years. The basic cost of 800 locomotives will be about INR 19000 crore rupees. According to Indian Railways Knowledge Portal, the ELF would lead to substantial development of ancillary manufacturing units, generation and direct and indirect employment in the region. The prototype locomotives are to be delivered in the next two years and only 5 locomotives are allowed to be imported and rest 795 locomotives are to be made in India.

According to Alstom India managing director Bharat Salhotra, this project would start with employing 150 people and could go up to a maximum of 500 people. "Madhepura locomotive factory will be a game changer for Bihar" said Alstom India.

As of 31 March 2022, the factory has rolled out 230 electric locomotives.

== Financial assets ==
As a joint venture company, both Indian Railways and Alstom are set to collectively invest $4.9 billion USD into ELF Madhepura. Ministry of Railways will hold 26% equity in JV company subject to a maximum of INR 100 crore. The contract ensures complete indigenisation of locomotives making it a true Make in India proposition. These efforts made by Ministry of Railways has received wide appreciation.

== Outcomes ==
These high HP locomotives are planned to be used in the Eastern Dedicated Freight Corridor and for pan-India operations for hauling freight trains of 6,000 tonnes (5,910 long tons; 6,610 short tons). With its modern features, the average speed of such trains will be around 60 mph (97 km/h) rather than the existing 25 mph (40 km/h). This will enhance the line carrying capacity of locomotives.

In terms of employment, it would generate employment not only to Bihar but also nearby areas such as West Bengal and Jharkhand.

Additionally, the multiplier effect in the railway sector is estimated to be nine, so the two major FDI projects in Bihar could give a significant boost to the state's economy.

== See also ==
- Diesel Locomotive Factory, Marhowrah
- Chittaranjan Locomotive Works, Asansol
- Banaras Locomotive Works, Varanasi
- Integral Coach Factory, Chennai
- List of locomotive builders by countries
- Modern Coach Factory, Raebareli
- Rail Coach Factory, Kapurthala
- Rail Wheel Plant, Bela
- Rail Wheel Factory, Yelahanka
- Titagarh Wagons, Titagarh
