= East–West Dedicated Freight Corridor =

Upcoming dedicated freight corridor in India

Overview
- Status: Approved (land acquisition under progress)
- Owner: DFCCIL
- Locale: West Bengal, Jharkhand, Odisha, Chhattisgarh, Maharashtra, and Gujarat
- Termini: Dankuni, West Bengal; Palghar, Maharashtra

Service
- Type: Freight rail
- Operator(s): DFCCIL

Technical
- Line length: 2,000 km (1,200 mi)
- Track gauge: 5 ft 6 in (1,676 mm) Indian broad gauge
- Electrification: 25 kV 50 Hz AC overhead catenary

East–West Dedicated Freight Corridor or East–West DFC is a freight specific railway proposed from Eastern to Western India by Indian Railways. The corridor will run between Dankuni in West Bengal and Palghar in Maharashtra. It was announced by then Railway Minister Suresh Prabhu, while presenting the Railway Budget of India in the fiscal year 2016–17. The Government has indicated that they are likely to use foreign direct investment for funding the project. The project would be undertaken through Public Private Partnership (PPP) model.

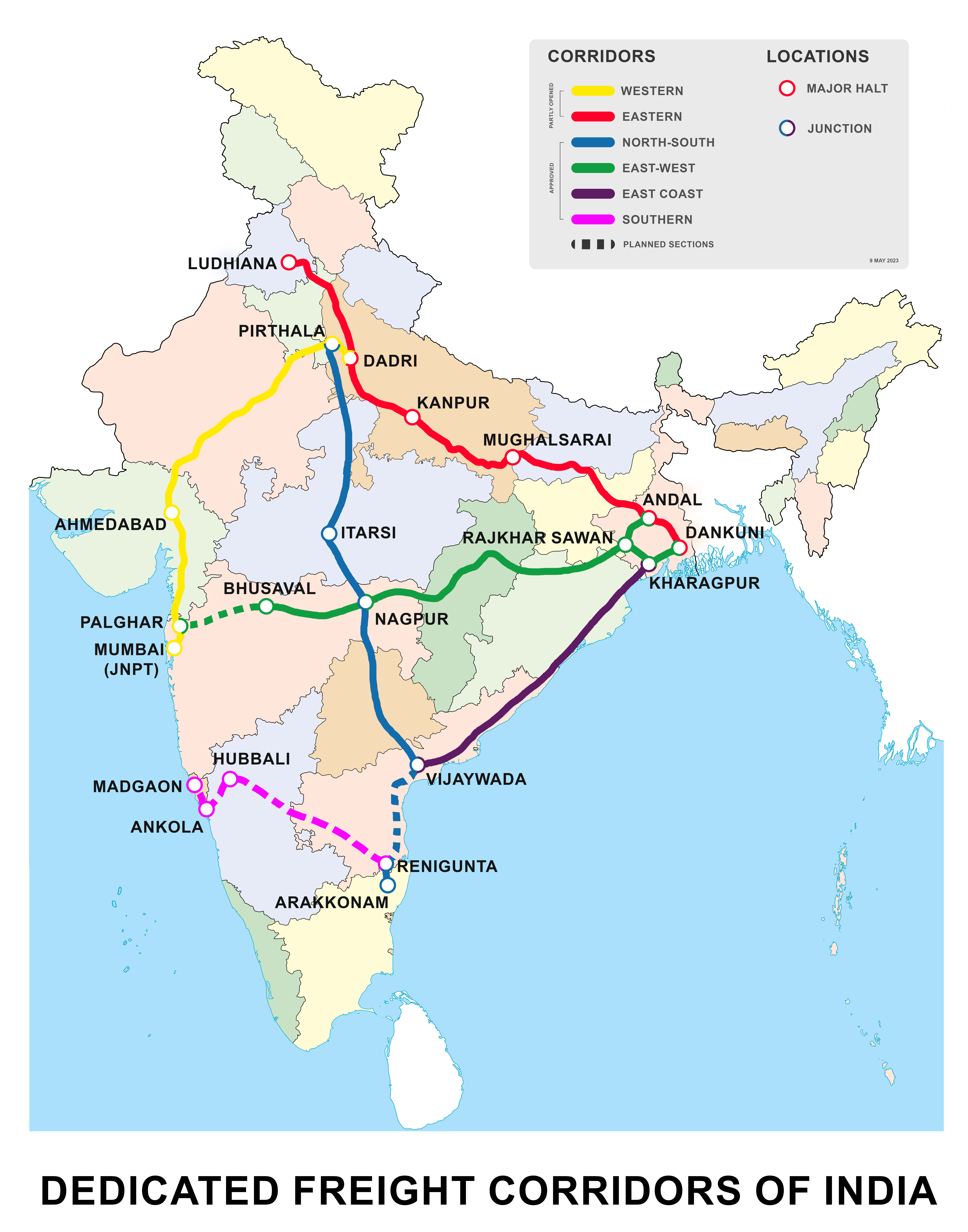
The under development dedicated freight corridor network in India.

Notably, freight trains with a speed of maximum 100 km per hour will pass through the East-West DFC.

== See also ==
- Dedicated freight corridors in India
  - Eastern Dedicated Freight Corridor
  - Western Dedicated Freight Corridor
