= Indian locomotive class WAG-12 =

Indian Railway freight class high horsepower electric locomotive

WAG-12B
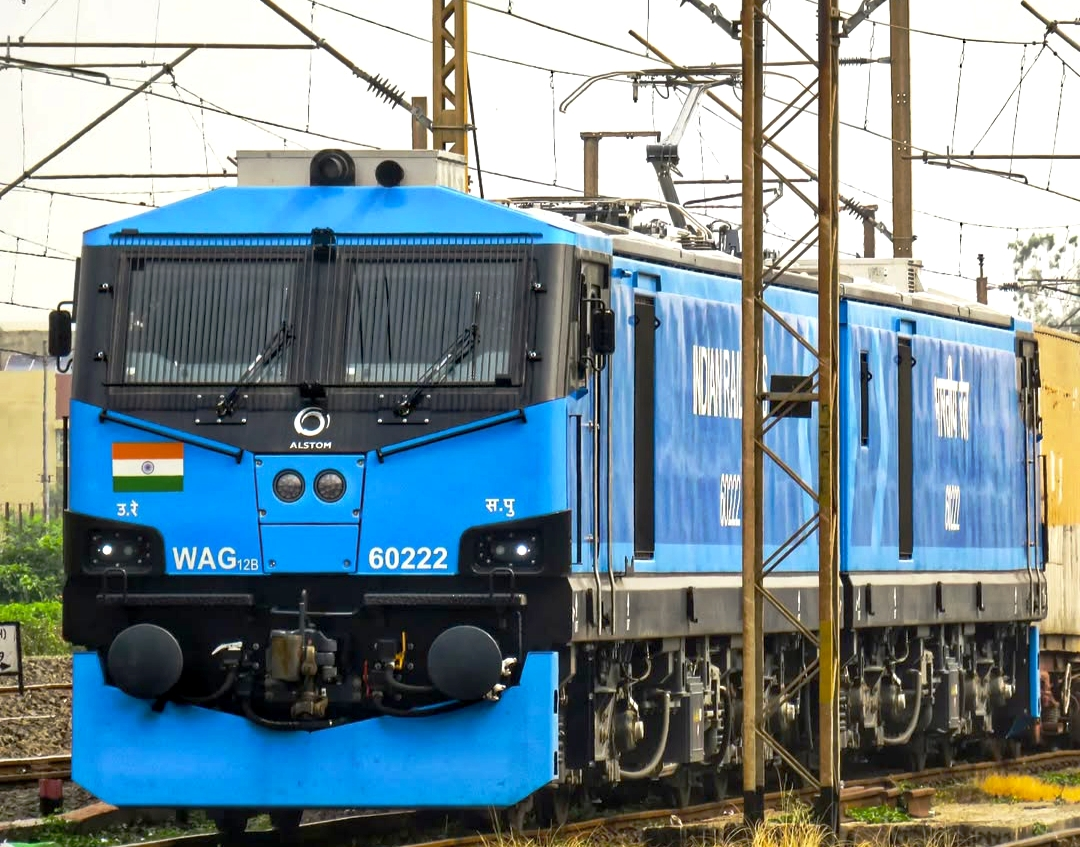
- Saharanpur based WAG-12B at Dum Dum Junction.
Type and origin
- Power type: Electric
- Designer: Alstom & RDSO
- Builder: ELF, Madhepura
- Model: Alstom Prima T8
- Build date: 2017–present
- Total produced: 668 as of November 2026
Specifications
- Configuration
  - UIC: Bo′Bo′+Bo′Bo′
- Gauge: 5 ft 6 in (1,676 mm) Indian gauge
- Wheel diameter: New: 1,250 mm (4 ft 1 1/4 in), Half worn: 1,207 mm (4 ft 0 in); Full worn: 1,164 mm (3 ft 10 in)
- Wheelbase
  - Bogie: 2,600 mm (8 ft 6 in)
- Pivot centres: 10,200 mm (33 ft 6 in)
- Panto shoes: 9,000 mm (29 ft 6 in)
- Length
  - Over couplers: 38,400 mm (126 ft 0 in)
- Width: 3,215 mm (10 ft 7 in)
- Height
  - Pantograph: 4,245 mm (13 ft 11 in)
- Axle load: 22.5 tonnes (22.1 long tons; 24.8 short tons) (upgradable to 25 tonnes (25 long tons; 28 short tons))
- Loco weight: 180 tonnes (180 long tons; 200 short tons) (upgradable to 200 tonnes (200 long tons; 220 short tons))
- Electric system/s: 25 kV 50 Hz AC Overhead
- Current pickup: Pantograph
- Traction motors: 6FRA-4576D, Asynchronous, Forced Cooled, Nose Suspended
  - Continuous: 1125 kW @ 1750 rpm
- Gear ratio: 110:23
- MU working: 2 units
- Loco brake: Air Brake, Regenerative Brake
- Train brakes: Air
- Safety systems: Kavach ATP (Planned)
- Couplers: CBC coupler, Buffers and chain coupler
Performance figures
- Maximum speed: 120 km/h (75 mph)
- Power output
  - Continuous: 9,000 kW (12,000 hp)
- Tractive effort
  - Starting: 705 kN (158,000 lb_{f}) @ 22.5t/axle load 785 kN (176,000 lb_{f}) @ 25t/axle load
- Dynamic brake peak effort: 514 kN (116,000 lb_{f}) @ 22.5t/axle load
Career
- Operators: Indian Railways
- Numbers: 60001+
- Locale: India
- Delivered: 11 October 2017
- First run: 19 May 2020

The Indian locomotive class WAG-12B is a class of 25 kV AC twin section electric locomotives that was developed in 2017 by Alstom with technological collaboration with Indian Railways. The model name stands for wide gauge (W), alternating current (A), goods traffic (G) locomotive-12. They entered trial service in 2019. As of March 2026, a total of 598 WAG-12B were built at the Electric Locomotive Factory, Madhepura, Bihar, India.

With a power output of 12,000 hp, the WAG 12 is twice as powerful as its immediate predecessor, WAG-9. The locomotive was developed for use on dedicated freight corridors, where it is used to haul freight trains weighing more than 6,000 tonnes (5,900 long tons; 6,600 short tons) at speeds of 100 km/h (62 mph) to 120 km/h (75 mph), doubling the average speed of freight trains in the sector.

== History ==
=== Origins ===
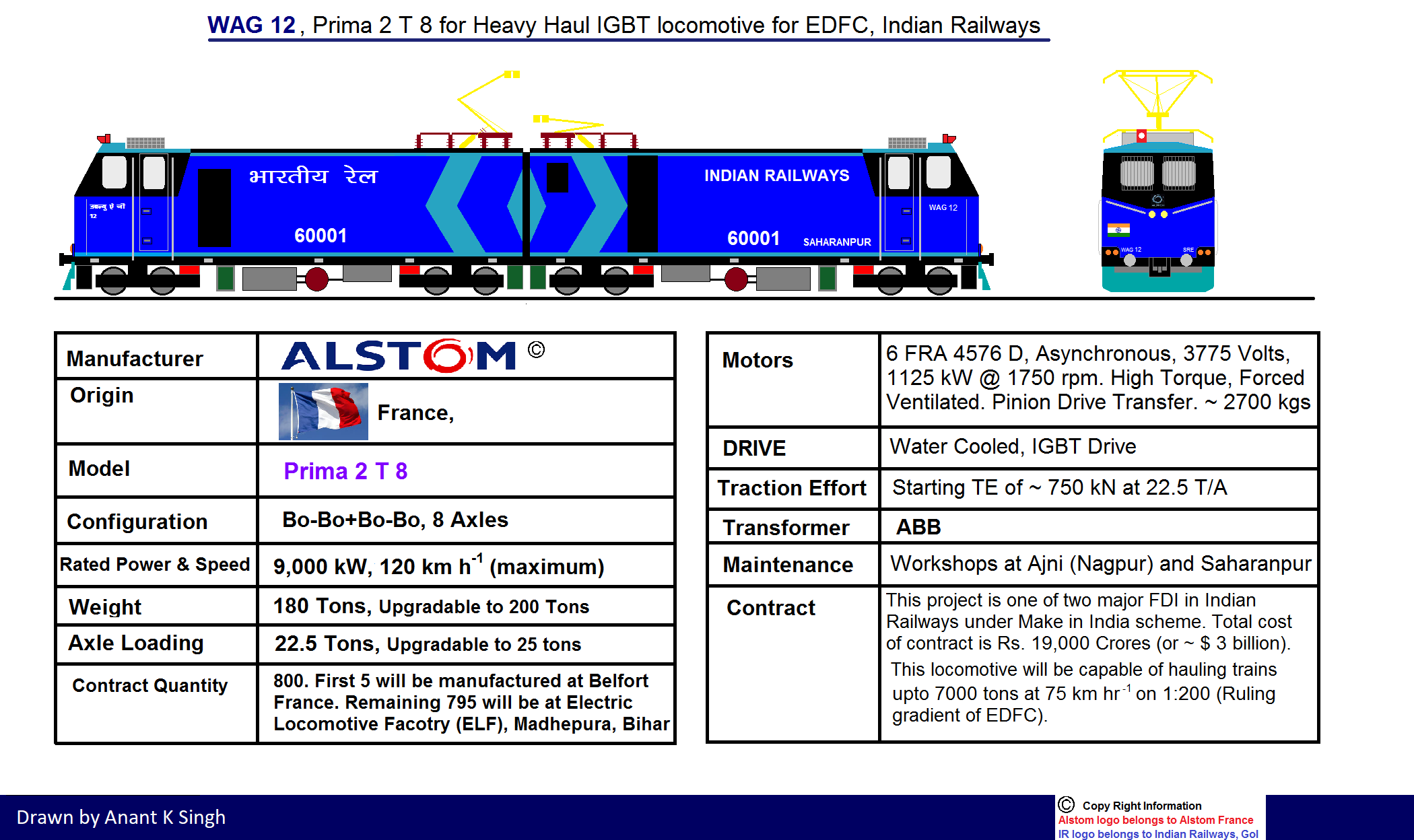
WAG 12 locomotive details

The origins of WAG-12B can be traced back to 2006. When the Government of India approved the Dedicated Freight Corridor (DFC) project and set up the DFCCIL to build it. In order to run trains at high efficiency, the most powerful Indian locomotive of that era, the WAG-9 was deemed inadequate. Instead, new locomotives, for dedicated operations on the two DFCs, were tendered. This was a change to locomotives previously being built at CLW by Indian Railways under technology transfer agreements.

In June 2008, the Ministry of Railways invited bids from global firms to design and manufacture the locomotives. The initial deal was to set up a new electric locomotive factory at Madhepura, Bihar to build and maintain 660 high-horsepower locomotives in a joint venture where Indian Railways would hold a 26% stake and the bidder 74%. This would have been the first foreign direct investment in the fully state-owned railway sector of the country.

This invitation received bids from General Electric, Alstom, Bombardier Transportation, Siemens Mobility, China CNR and CSR Corporation. The number of locomotives to be built was later increased from 660 to 800. The Research Design and Standards Organisation published a specification with capability requirements in June 2013, detailing an eight-axle locomotive intended to be used on dedicated freight corridors (DFC). It was not until November 2015, however, that Alstom was finally awarded the contract to build the locomotives.

=== Development ===
Development began after the Ministry of Railways and Alstom signed a contract worth ₹25,000 crore (equivalent to ₹410 billion or US$4.4 billion in 2026). and created a joint venture for the project. The first locomotive was initially expected to enter service on 28 February 2018. Alstom announced that the new locomotive would be based on its highly successful Prima T8 model.. This was the first time in 20 years that Indian Railways procured new locomotives.

The locomotive was launched by Prime Minister Narendra Modi in Madhepura, Bihar on 10 April 2018.

=== Production ===
As development of the engines progressed, Alstom awarded ABB a contract to produce 1600 traction transformers for the locomotives in 2016. These all-weather transformers were to be produced in Vadodara, Gujarat. In 2017, Alstom awarded a contract to supplying braking systems to Knorr-Bremse. These brakes were to be produced at Palwal in the Indian state of Haryana. The couplers of the locomotive were supplied by Faiveley Transport. 85-90% of the components will be procured within India.

The first bodyshell of the locomotive was delivered to the Haldia Port in West Bengal on 20 September 2017. It was then transferred to the Electric Locomotive Factory (Alstom Madhepura) for final assembly, which began on 11 October 2017. The first locomotive, numbered 60001, was tested in the Madhepura factory on 27 February 2018, one day before its initial launch date.

Deliveries of the locomotives were planned from 2018 through 2028, with the first locomotive to enter service in 2018, and a total of five by 2019. This was due to be followed by the assembly of 35 new locomotives in 2020, 60 in 2021, and 100 locomotives each year from 2022 until all 800 locomotives are delivered.

Delivery schedule
2018	2019	2020	2021	2022	2023	2024	2025	2026	2027	2028	Total
	5	35	60	100	100	100	100	100	100	100	800

== Design ==
They are three phase, twin-section electric freight locomotive consisting of two identical sections, each of which rests on two twin-axled Bo-Bo bogies. The locomotive is being jointly developed by Alstom and the Indian Railways, and is the first Indian Railways locomotive that has a power output greater than 10,000 horsepower. With a power output of 12,000 hp, it is twice as powerful as its immediate predecessor, the WAG 9.

The eight-axle design of the locomotive reportedly improves performance and minimises energy consumption and maintenance costs. The locomotive incorporates special features based on the Alstom Prima T8 for operations in humid or dusty environments and extreme temperatures ranging from −50 °C (−58 °F) to 50 °C (122 °F). The cabin of the locomotive is comparatively larger and offers better comfort for drivers, especially during long-distance operations. The locomotives can also be equipped with climate control systems such as air conditioners, food preparation and storage facilities, and even a toilet—a standard that Indian Railways introduced in 2016.

It will also has systems, including GPS and GPRS-based remote diagnostics, tracking and systems monitoring, wireless control of multiple-unit locomotives, cruise control, autopilot, and an incident recorder.

== Sub-classes ==
=== WAG-12 ===
This is the original version delivered. Limitations of the original WAG-12 design resulted in modifications and the WAG-12B production model. Only one WAG-12 unit (60001) was made. This unit has since been modified to WAG-12B specification.

=== WAG-12B ===
This is the current version in production, with over 800 units planned. Differences from the original WAG-12 prototype include:

Spec	WAG-12	WAG-12B
Total length	35,000 mm	38,400 mm
Bogie design	Flat solebar	Gooseneck or handlebar shaped solebar
Traction link coupling between the bogie and body	Below the driving cab	Turned around and now provided in the middle of the body
Center to center distance between the bogies	Lower (8,500 mm)	Higher (10,200 mm)

== Locomotive shed ==
Zone	Name	Shed Code	Quantity
Central Railway	Nagpur	NEDA	250
Northern Railway	Saharanpur	MELS	248
Western Railway	Sabarmati	SBTD	170
Total locomotives active as of November 2026			668

== Incidents ==
On 16 February 2023, WAG-12B #60038, based at Saharanpur, was involved in an accident with WDG-4 70159. It hit a goods train head on in Sultanpur, Uttar Pradesh, and both remained on the tracks.

On the morning of 2 June 2024, a Saharanpur based WAG-12B #60059 was involved in an accident. A goods train overshot a signal on the DFC corridor near Sirhind Junction, Punjab, and hit another stationary goods train. Two drivers were injured in the incident.

== See also ==
- Rail transport in India
- Locomotives of India
- Dedicated Freight Corridor Corporation of India
