= Dadri railway station =

Railway station in Uttar Pradesh, India

Dadri Railway Station
- Indian Railways logo

General information
- Location: Dadri, Gautam Buddh Nagar district, Uttar Pradesh; India
- Coordinates: 28.5388°N 77.5374°E
- Elevation: 212 metres (696 ft)
- System: Indian Railways station
- Owner: Indian Railways
- Operator: North Central Railway
- Platforms: 4
- Tracks: 5 (double electrified broad gauge)
- Connections: Autorickshaw stand

Construction
- Structure type: Standard (on-ground station)
- Parking: No
- Cycle facilities: No

Other information
- Status: Functioning
- Station code: DER
- Zone(s): North Central Railway
- Division(s): Prayagraj
Location
- Location within India Location within Uttar Pradesh

Dadri railway station is a railway station serving the city of Dadri in Gautam Buddh Nagar district, Uttar Pradesh, India, on the Delhi–Aligarh–Kanpur section, around 50 km east of Delhi. Its station code in Indian Railways terminology is DER. Dadri is a wayside station at which only a few commuter trains stop. The station consists of four platforms which are not well sheltered and lack most facilities including sanitation.

The Electronic interlocking and massive yard remodelling has been commissioned at Dadri station. Dadri is a complex yard in North Central Railway (NCR) spread over 6 km on busy Delhi–Kanpur-Howrah route and also having connectivity with NTPC Dadri Power Plant and Container Depot.

== Trains ==
Trains that halt at Dadri:

- Hathras Killah–Delhi–Hathras Killah MEMU
- Delhi–Aligarh–Delhi MEMU
- Tundla–Delhi–Tundla MEMU
- Lichchavi Express

== Dedicated Freight Corridor (DFC) ==
Dadri railway station on the Western Dedicated Freight Corridor (Western DFC) will be connected with Khurja railway station on Eastern Dedicated Freight Corridor (Eastern DFC) via a 46 km long branch line, for movement of Freight trains only. Both DFCs are under-construction.

== Gallery ==
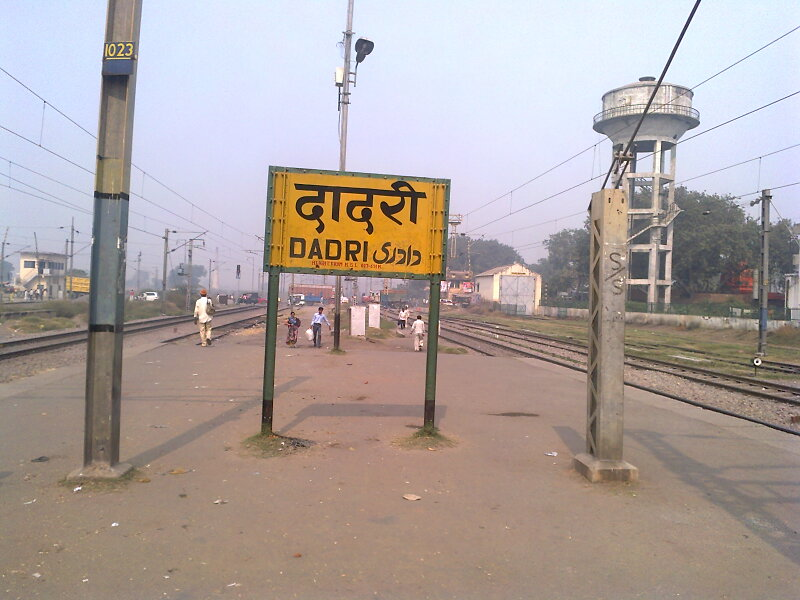
