= Bhaupur, Kanpur =

Coordinates: 26°55′N 79°13′E

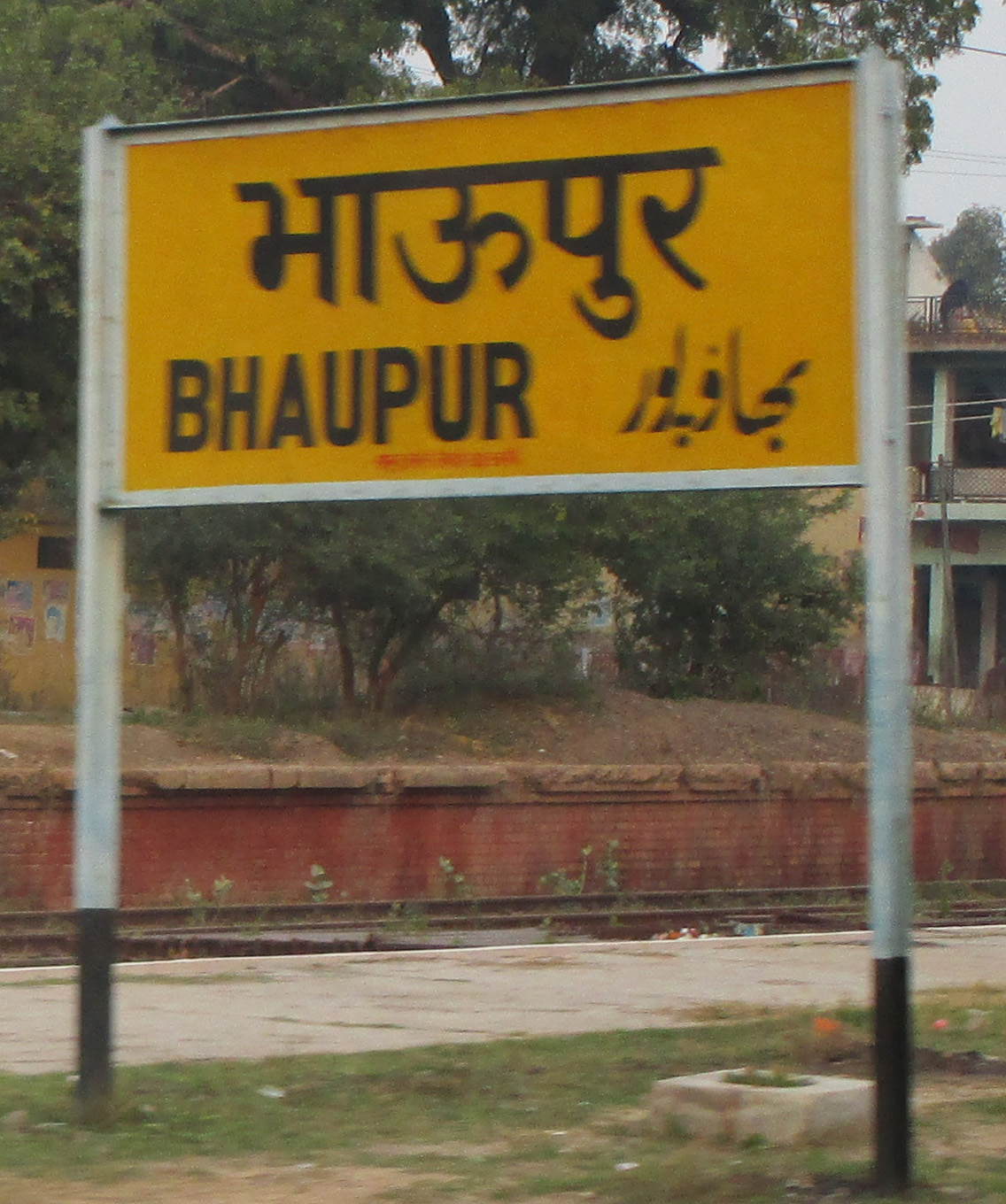
Bhaupur Railway Station nameplate

Bhaupur is a town in Kanpur Dehat district in the state of Uttar Pradesh, India.With World Bank funding development of Bhaupur Industrial Sector UPSIDC Amritsar-Kolkata dedicated freight corridor is being carried out.

It is located in Maitha development block of Akbarpur tehsil. Nearby villages are Ranjitpur, Bhadhpur, Bhool, Dharmangadpur, Naubasta, Pratappur, Raipalpur, Rasatpur, pachehara and Surar

== Transport ==
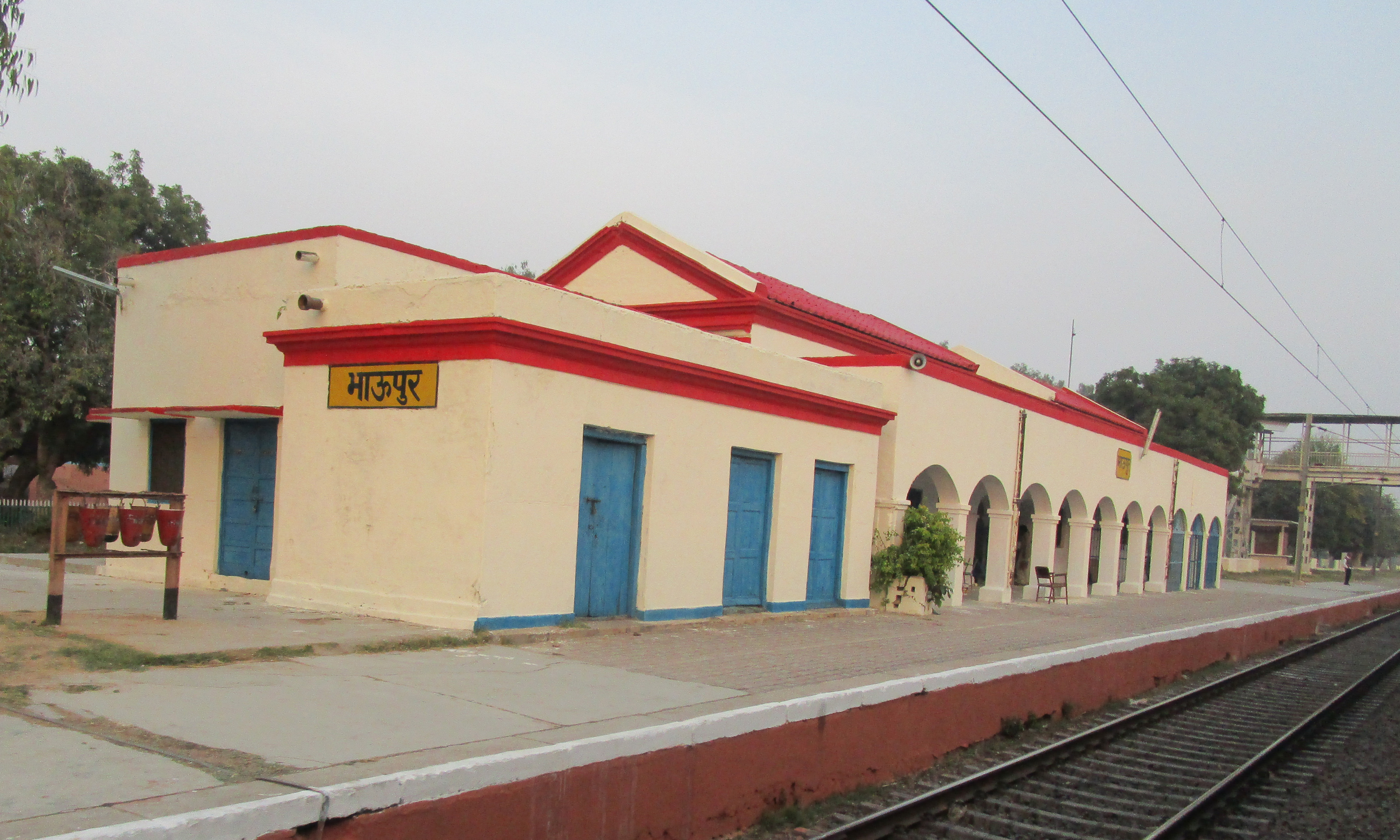
Bhaupur Railway Station at Kanpur Dehat

Bhaupur is well connected by road and rail.

Bhaupur Railway Station is on the Agra-Kanpur rail route. Kanpur-Etawah passenger and Kanpur-Tundla Passenger are among the main trains that pass through this station. To the east, Panki Station (11 km) is the nearest Station. Going west, Maitha (10 km) is the next station. Kanpur Central Railway Station is the nearest major railway station. Station Code is: BPU

Nearest International Airport is Amausi Airport or Chaudhary Charan Singh International Airport (IATA: LKO, ICAO: VILK) having regular scheduled flight. The nearest domestic airport is at Kanpur Chakeri. Although Kanpur City have number of airstrips along with a full-fledged Airport but there have been only periodic schedule flights from it.

== Demographics ==
As of 2001 India census, Bhaupur had a population of 823. Males constitute 57% of the population and females 43%. The Bhaupur village has population of 823 of which 405 are males while 418 are females as per Population Census 2011. Bhaupur village has higher literacy rate compared to Uttar Pradesh. In 2011, literacy rate of Bhaupur village was 88.63% compared to 67.68% of Uttar Pradesh. In Bhaupur Male literacy stands at 93.04% while female literacy rate was 82.67%.

== Geography ==
Bhaupur is located at 26°28'6"N 80°7'21"E.
