= Dankuni =

Dankuni ডানকুনি
- City; Kolkata Metropolitan Region
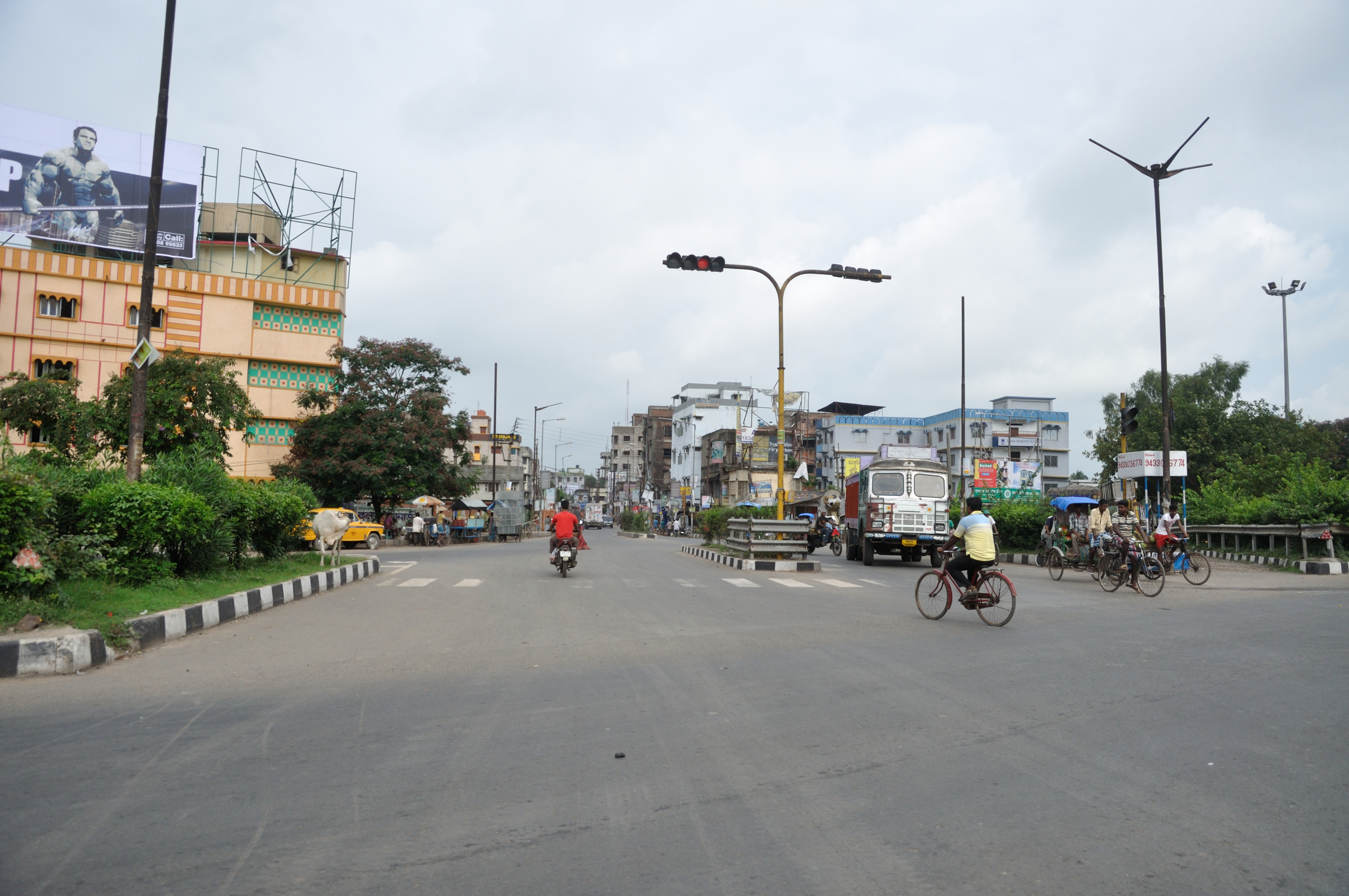
- T.N. Mukherjee Road, Durgapur Expressway, Dankuni, 712311

- Location in Kolkata, West Bengal, India Dankuni (West Bengal) Dankuni (India)
- Coordinates: 22.681041°N 88.297085°E
- Country: India
- State: West Bengal
- Division: Burdwan
- District: Hooghly
- Subdivision: Serampore

Government
  - Type: Municipality
  - Body: Dankuni Municipality
  - Chairperson: Hasina Shabnam

Area
  - Total: 35 km^{2} (14 sq mi)
- Elevation: 7.9 m (26 ft)

Population (2011)
  - Total: 249,840
  - Rank: 11th in West Bengal
  - Density: 7,100/km^{2} (18,000/sq mi)
- Demonym: Dankunian

Languages
  - Official: Bengali, English
- Time zone: UTC+5:30 (IST)
- PIN: 711205, 712310, 712311, 712702 and 712708
- Telephone code: +91 33
- Vehicle registration: WB-18
- Website: http://dankunimunicipality.in/

Dankuni is a city in Kolkata Metropolitan Region of Hooghly district in the Indian State of West Bengal. It is a part of the area covered by Kolkata Metropolitan Development Authority (KMDA). Dankuni has rapidly grown into one of the region’s most dynamic urban hubs.

Once a small township, Dankuni has grown into an industrial and commercial centre, attracting businesses and a growing residential population. Its urban area combines industry with expanding residential neighbourhoods.

== Geography ==
Cities and towns in Chanditala I, Chanditala II and Jangipara CD blocks in Srirampore subdivision in Hooghly district
M: municipal city/ town, CT: census town, R: rural/ urban centre,
Owing to space constraints in the small map, the actual locations in a larger map may vary slightly

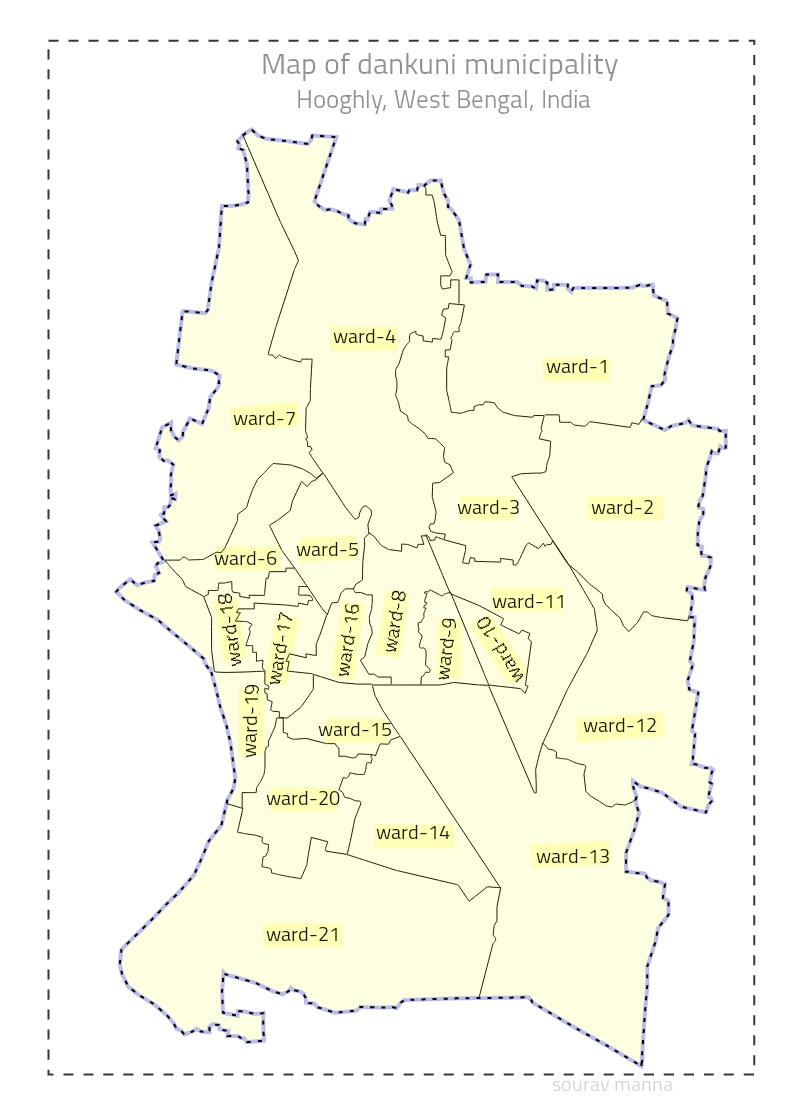
Map of Dankuni municipality

=== Location ===
Dankuni is located at 22.681041°N 88.297085°E.

Kharsarai, Tisa, Kapashanria, Jaykrishnapur, Purba Tajpur, Begampur, Baksa, Panchghara, Chikrand, Janai, Pairagachha, Naiti, Barijhati, Garalgachha and Krishnapur, all the census towns form a series from the northern part of Chanditala II CD Block to its southern part. The only municipality in the area, Dankuni, located outside the CD Block, occupies the south-east corner of the entire cluster.

=== Police station ===
Dankuni police station has jurisdiction over Dankuni Municipal area and parts of Dankuni Housing complex police station and Sreerampur Uttarpara CD Blocks.

=== Urbanisation ===
Srirampore subdivision is the most urbanized of the subdivisions in Hooghly district. 73.13% of the population in the subdivision is urban and 26.88% is rural. The subdivision has 6 municipalities and 34 census towns. The municipalities are: Uttarpara Kotrung Municipality, Konnagar Municipality, Serampore Municipality, Baidyabati Municipality, Rishra Municipality and Dankuni Municipality. Amongst the CD Blocks in the subdivision, Uttarapara Serampore (census towns shown in a separate map) had 76% urban population, Chanditala I 42%, Chanditala II 69% and Jangipara 7% (census towns shown in the map above). All places marked in the map are linked in the larger full screen map.

=== Climate ===
City has a tropical climate. When compared with winter, the summers have much more rainfall. According to Köppen and Geiger, this climate is classified as Aw.

Located at an elevation of 0 metres/feet above sea level, city's yearly temperature is 30.28 °C (86.5 °F) and it is 4.31% higher than India's averages. Dankuni typically receives about 150.21 millimetres (5.914 inches) of precipitation and has 150.54 rainy days (41.24% of the time) annually.

== Etymology ==
The origin of the name "Dankuni" is not entirely clear, but there are a few theories about its etymology.

One theory suggests that the name "Dankuni" is derived from the Bengali words "Dhanya" (meaning "grain") and "Kuni" (meaning "heap"). This theory suggests that Dankuni was once a place where grains were stored in large heaps.

Another theory suggests that the name "Dankuni" is derived from the name of a local deity, "Dhankuni." According to this theory, the city was named after the deity and the temple that was built in her honor.

There is also a third theory that suggests that the name "Dankuni" is derived from the Sanskrit word "Dhenukuni." "Dhenu" means "cow" and "kuni" means "pit," so the name would refer to a pit where cows were kept. It is not clear which theory is correct, but all of them suggest that the name "Dankuni" has agricultural roots and is linked to the region's history as an agricultural area.

== History ==
The city has a rich history that dates back to the pre-colonial era. During the 18th century, Dankuni came under the control of the British East India Company. The city was an important center of jute production and had several jute mills that provided employment to the local population.

In the early 20th century, Dankuni became a hub of the Indian independence movement. Many freedom fighters, including Netaji Subhas Chandra Bose, visited the city and addressed public meetings.

After India gained independence in 1947, Dankuni underwent rapid industrialization. Several factories and industries were set up in the city, which led to an influx of people from different parts of the country.

== Demography ==
=== Population ===
In the 2011 census, Dankuni Urban Agglomeration had a population of 249,840, out of which 128,139 were males and 121,701 were females. The 0–6 years population was 22,956. Effective literacy rate for the 7+ population was 85.69 per cent.

Religion in Dankuni Urban Agglomeration (2011)
| Religion | Percentage |
| Hinduism | 83.48% |
| Islam | 10.33% |
| Buddhism | 2.75% |
| Sikhism | 1.73% |
| Christianity | 1.21% |
| Others | 0.49% |

=== Literacy Rate ===
The literacy rate of Dankuni Agglomeration is 84.72% which is lower than National Urban average of 85%. Literacy rate for male and female for Dankuni stood at 88.10% and 81.20% respectively. Total literates in Dankuni UA were 190,629 of which males were 101,141 and remaining 89,488 were females.

=== Languages ===
Languages of Dankuni (2011)
1. Bengali (70.1%)
2. Hindi (25.8%)
3. Odia (2.39%)
4. Others (1.70%)

Bengali is the official language in Dankuni city.

In the city at the time of the 2011 census, 70.12% of the population spoke Bengali, 25.79% Hindi and 2.39% Odia as their first language.

=== Urban Agglomeration ===
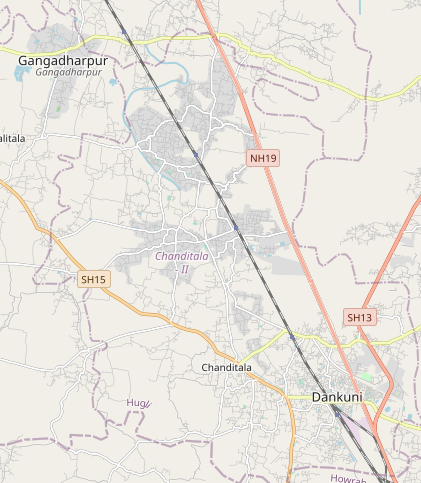
Map of Dankuni Urban Agglomeration

As per the 2011 census, Dankuni Urban Agglomeration includes: Dankuni (M), Purba Tajpur (CT), Kharsarai (CT), Begampur (CT), Chikrand (CT), Pairagachha (CT), Barijhati (CT), Garalgachha (CT), Krishnapur (CT), Baruipara (CT), Borai (CT), Nawapara (CT), Basai (CT), Gangadharpur (CT), Manirampur (CT), Janai (CT), Kapashanria (CT), Jaykrishnapur (CT), Tisa (CT), Baksa (CT), Panchghara (CT) and Naiti (CT).

== Civic administration ==
The civic administration of Dankuni is overseen by the Dankuni Municipality, which is responsible for providing basic civic amenities and services to the residents of the town.

The Dankuni Municipality is headed by a chairman who is elected by the members of the municipality. The municipality is divided into wards, and each ward is represented by a councillor who is also elected by the residents of the ward.

== Education ==
Colleges

- Seven Rangers Institute of Nursing

Schools

- Methodist School, Dankuni
- Annapurna Pry.
- Balai Ch. Smriti Vidyaniketan
- Bonderbil Panchanantala Pry
- Chakundi Pry School
- Chakundi High School
- Chakundi Sayadatia.q.m.s.kendra
- Dankuni Agragami Pry School
- Dankuni Ashwash Inst For The Disabled
- Dankuni S R K G. Vidyashram
- Dankuni S R K Vidyashram
- Dankuni Siddiquia Sr. Madrasaa
- Gobra Pry School
- Kalipur Pramathanath Pry
- Kharial Board Pry
- Kharial High School
- Mathurdangi Pry School
- Monber Kalitala Board Pry School
- Monber Vivekananda Vidyapith
- Monoharpur Chamundamata Pry
- Monoharpur Model Pry
- Monoharpur Pallimangal Pry
- Mrigala Pry School
- Mrigala Barajala Pry School
- Pardankuni Panchanantala Pry
- Pardankuni Pry School
- Patha Bhavan Dankuni
- Patsaihat K.a.m. Pry School
- Ramkrishnabati Pry
- Satghara Pry
- Sree Ramkrishna Sishu Tirtha High School
- Sri Ramkrishna Sishuthirtha Pry.
- Vidyasagar Pry School
- Zamila Jabbar

== Economy ==
=== Commercial and Industrial activity ===
Some of the units engaged in commercial and industrial activity in and around Dankuni are:

- Diesel Locomotive Component Factory of the Indian Railways was inaugurated by Mamata Banerjee at Dankuni in 2012. It produces high horse power diesel locomotive underframes. It functions as a sister unit of Banaras Locomotive Works at Varanasi.
- Electric Loco Assembly and Ancillary Unit of Chittaranjan Locomotive Works of Indian Railways at Dankuni has started functioning in 2016.
- The Eastern Dedicated Freight Corridor will have its eastern terminus at Dankuni. The 1,839 km long Eastern Dedicated Freight Corridor from Ludhiana to Dankuni, is part of the total Dedicated Freight Corridor Project, presently with two corridors (western and eastern). The Son Nagar-Dankuni sector of the eastern corridor, will have electrified double line. There is provision for extension of the lines to the proposed deep-sea port in the Kolkata area. The Sonnagar-Dankuni sector is to be implemented through the PPP mode. The eastern corridor will serve primarily the steel and coal sectors. The Government of India approved the project in 2006 at an estimated initial cost of Rs. 28,181 crores. As of 2015, the project is delayed and needs additional sanctions for cost over runs.
- Mother Dairy, Kolkata was set up as a part of Operation Flood launched by the National Dairy Development Board in the 1970s. It covered the 4 metros and all the units were named Mother Dairy. Eventually, NDDB moved out and West Bengal Cooperative Milk Producers Federation took over in 1996. This is separate from the Delhi-based Mother Dairy. Kolkata Mother Dairy’s main plant at Dankuni produces 4.5 lakh litres of milk daily. Apart from milk, it produces dahi, yoghurt, paneer, ghee and drinking water.
- Dankuni Coal Complex, a low temperature carbonisation plant set up by Coal India Limited in the 1980s, and currently operated under lease, by South Eastern Coalfields Limited, at Dankuni, to produces 1,000 MT per day of solid smokeless fuel branded as "CIL Coke™" and 18 million cft per day of coal gas for supply in and around Kolkata and Howrah, through the Greater Calcutta Gas Supply Corporation Limited (A Govt of WB State Undertaking); Tar Chemicals.
- Bhusan Power and Steel started with a cold rolling and galvanising plants in 2001 at Bangihati, Mallickpara, Dankuni and have subsequently expanded.
- Dankuni Poly Chemicals Pvt. Ltd. was incorporated in 1982. It manufactures refined petroleum products.
- Nezone Tubes Ltd., Delhi Road, Village: Chakundi, DCC Township, Dankuni, was established in 2000. It produces galvanised tubes, steel tubes and galvanised pipes.
- Bengal Beverages Pvt. Ltd. was established at Dankuni in 1984. The authorised bottlers of Coca-Cola, its key products include Thumps Up, Sprite, Coca-Cola, Fanta, Limca, Maaza, Kinley Soda and Kinley Water.
- Patco Tech India Private Limited was established at Dankuni in 2007. It manufactures and exports discharge and collecting electrodes and air preheater baskets, used in thermal power and steel industries.
- Vikrant Forge Limited was established at Dankuni in 1985. It manufactures and exports forgings up to 8 tonnes for the power, steel and other industries.
- Anmol Industries (formerly. Anmol Biscuits)., one of the leading biscuit manufacturers, was established in 1993. It produces 8 lakh cartons per month (in 2017). It has manufacturing units at Dankuni and Noida.
- Ifabex Technologies formed in 2012.

=== Township project ===
Dankuni has two townships. One, the Government Housing Estate, was constructed by the Government of West Bengal and is popularly known as "Dankuni Housing". The other is Dankuni Coal Complex Township of Coal India Limited, known as "Township", for its employees, which was constructed by National Projects Construction Corporation Limited. A large portion of the Dankuni Coal Complex Township is being slowly encroached upon by the West Bengal Police. The Dankuni Coal Complex authorities have given two areas, on a very low rent lease, to Methodist School and Patha Bhavan School, within the township premises.

In addition to this, there was a plan for a new township at Dankuni. The project area was 4,846 acres (19.61 km^{2}) of which 4,069 acres (16.47 km^{2}) was township area and 777 acres (3.14 km^{2}) was earmarked as industrial area. The project area covered 20 mouzas (villages) – 5 full and 15 part, spread across four police stations, namely Dankuni, Chanditala, Singur and Serampore. Important railway stations in the project area were Gobra, Janai Road and Begampur, apart from the important station at Dankuni itself, all on the Howrah-Bardhaman chord. Important road corridors cutting across the project area were Durgapur Expressway (NH 19), Delhi Road, Naity Road and Serampore-Siakhala Road. The Delhi-based DLF, which had entered into an agreement with KMDA for development of the township, withdrew from the project in 2009, primarily because KMDA was unable to procure land.

== Transport ==
Roads

Both NH 19 and NH 16 terminate at Dankuni. The Palsit-Dankuni section of NH 19 (old numbering NH 2) is also referred to as Durgapur Expressway. Other major arteries meeting at Dankuni are Belghoria Expressway connecting to NH 12 (old numbering: NH 34), SH 13/ Dankuni-Mogra Delhi Road and SH 15.

Dankuni Railway Station

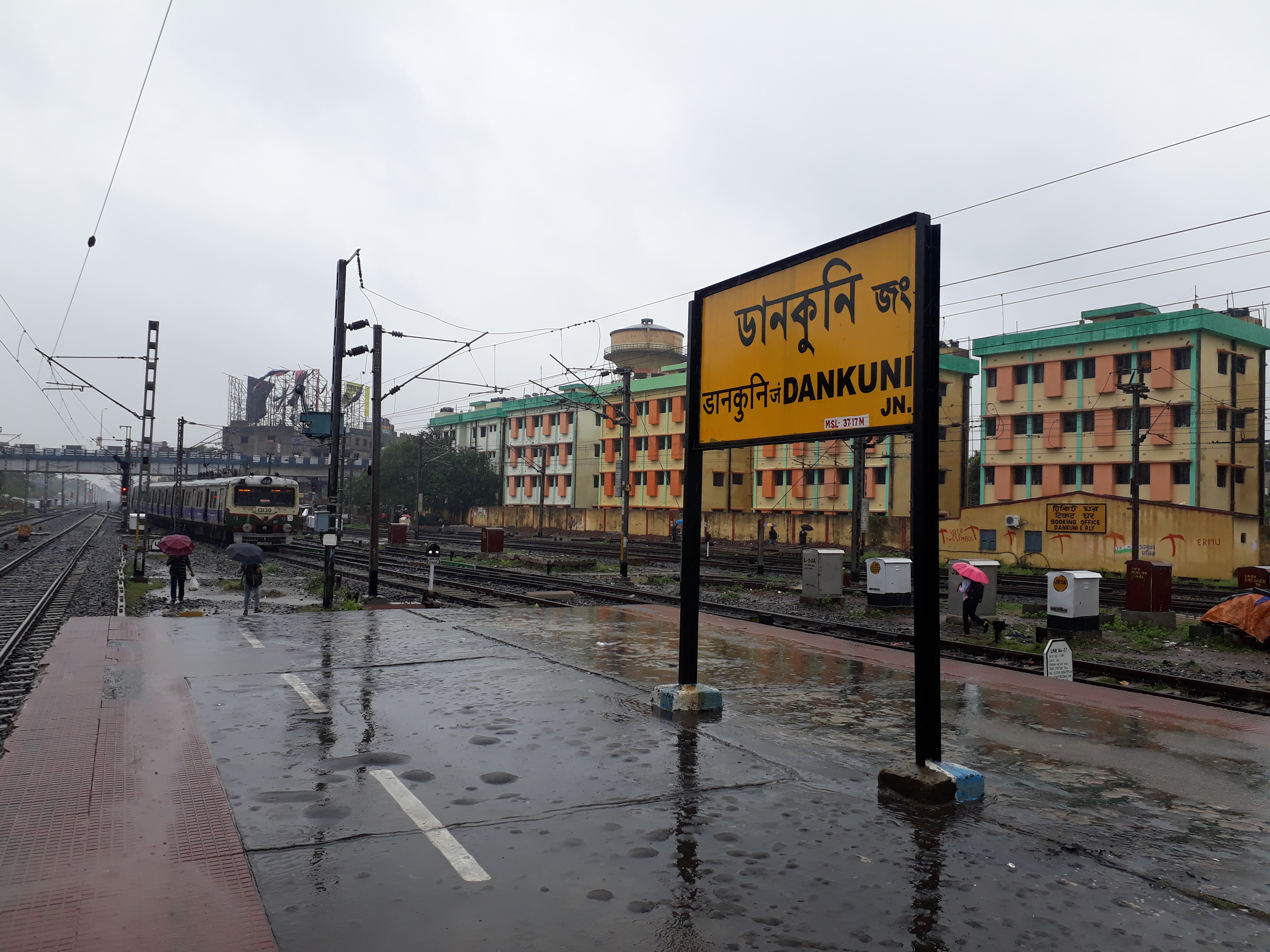
Dankuni railway station

Dankuni railway station is located on the Howrah-Bardhaman chord line, which was constructed in 1917. It is an important yard of the Howrah division. The Calcutta Chord from Dum Dum to Dankuni over the Willingdon Bridge (renamed Vivekananda Setu) was opened in 1932. It is part of the Kolkata Suburban Railway system. Already, there is a growing presence of freight and wagon movements around Dankuni Railway Station, which is important as it connects Eastern Railway with South Eastern Railway with a link line. Dankuni has a fast-growing freight yard, where goods traffic is moved, sorted and packed to deliver at other destinations.

Kolkata Airport

Netaji Subhash Chandra Bose International Airport is situated 18.6 km From Dankuni

Metro Railway

KMRCL has proposed a metro line from Howrah Maidan to Dankuni in 1st phase and further to Shrirampur in 2nd phase. The project aims to connect the Howrah metro with the suburb of Hooghly, located on the outskirts of Kolkata. The proposed metro line will be around 14.5 km long and will have 12 stations.

The project is being implemented by the Kolkata Metro Rail Corporation Limited (KMRCL). The estimated cost of the project is around Rs. 5,838 crore,2 rounds of servey has been done and it is expected to get approval in 2026.

== Neighborhoods ==
Dankuni has many neighborhoods the most notable being Howrah, Uttarpara, Konnagar, Chanditala, Jagadishpur, Serampore and Bally
