= Son Nagar Junction railway station =

Railway station in Aurangabad, Bihar, India

SON NAGAR JUNCTION

- Son Nagar railway station nameplate

General information
- Location: Son Nagar, Aurangabad, Bihar; India
- Coordinates: 24°52′53″N 84°13′44″E
- System: Indian Railways station
- Line: New Delhi–Gaya–Howrah line
- Platforms: 4

Construction
- Structure type: Standard (on ground station)

Other information
- Status: Functioning
- Station code: SEB
- Zone(s): Eastern Central Railway
- Division(s): Pandit Deen Dayal Upadhyaya

History
- Opened: 1902
- Former names: East Indian Railway
Location

Son Nagar Junction (station code: SEB), is a railway station in Aurangabad district, of the Indian state of Bihar. It serves Barun and Daudnagar towns of Bihar. It is located on the east bank of the Son River and was earlier known as Son East Bank.

== History ==
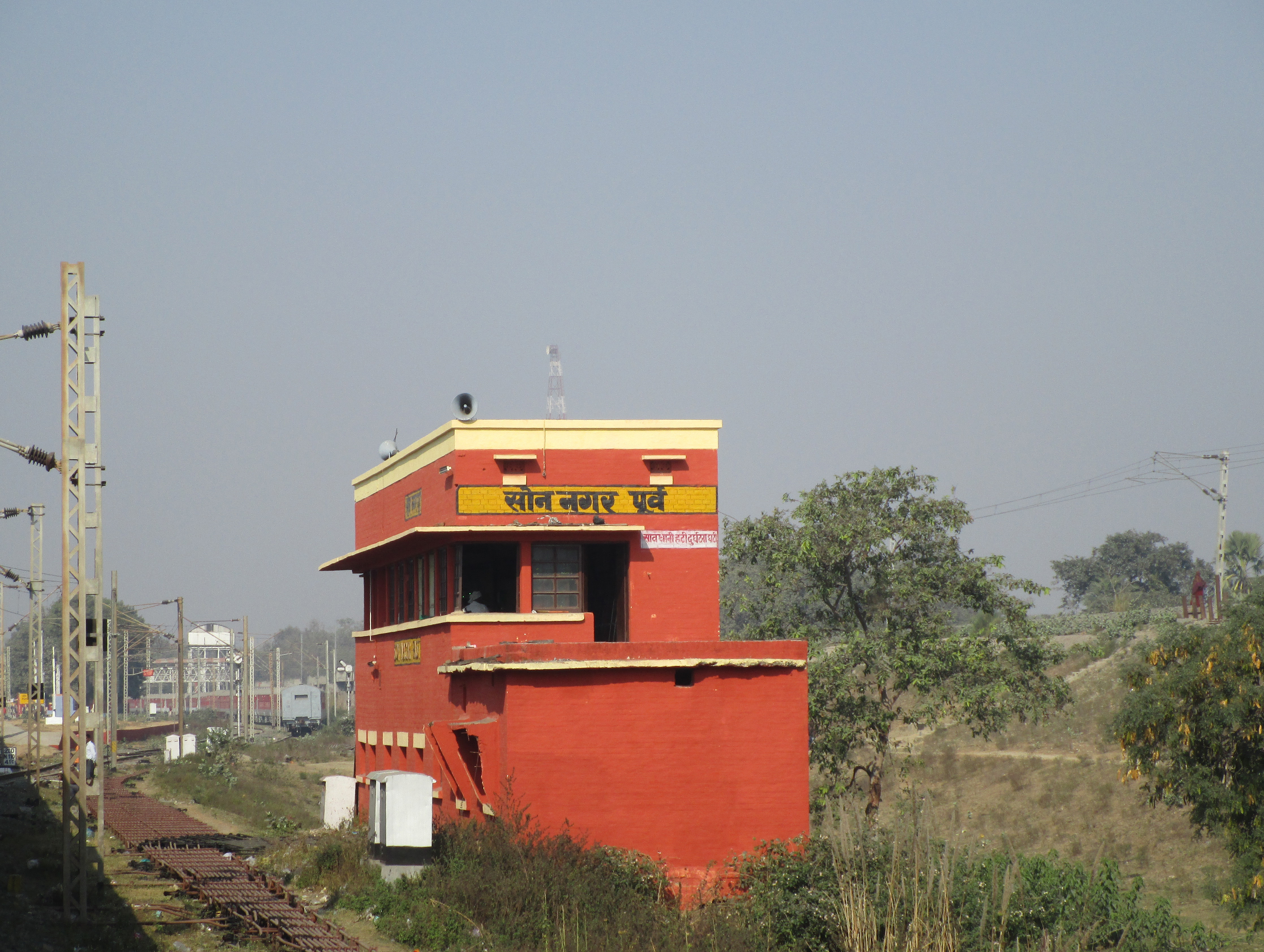
Son Nagar railway station east control room

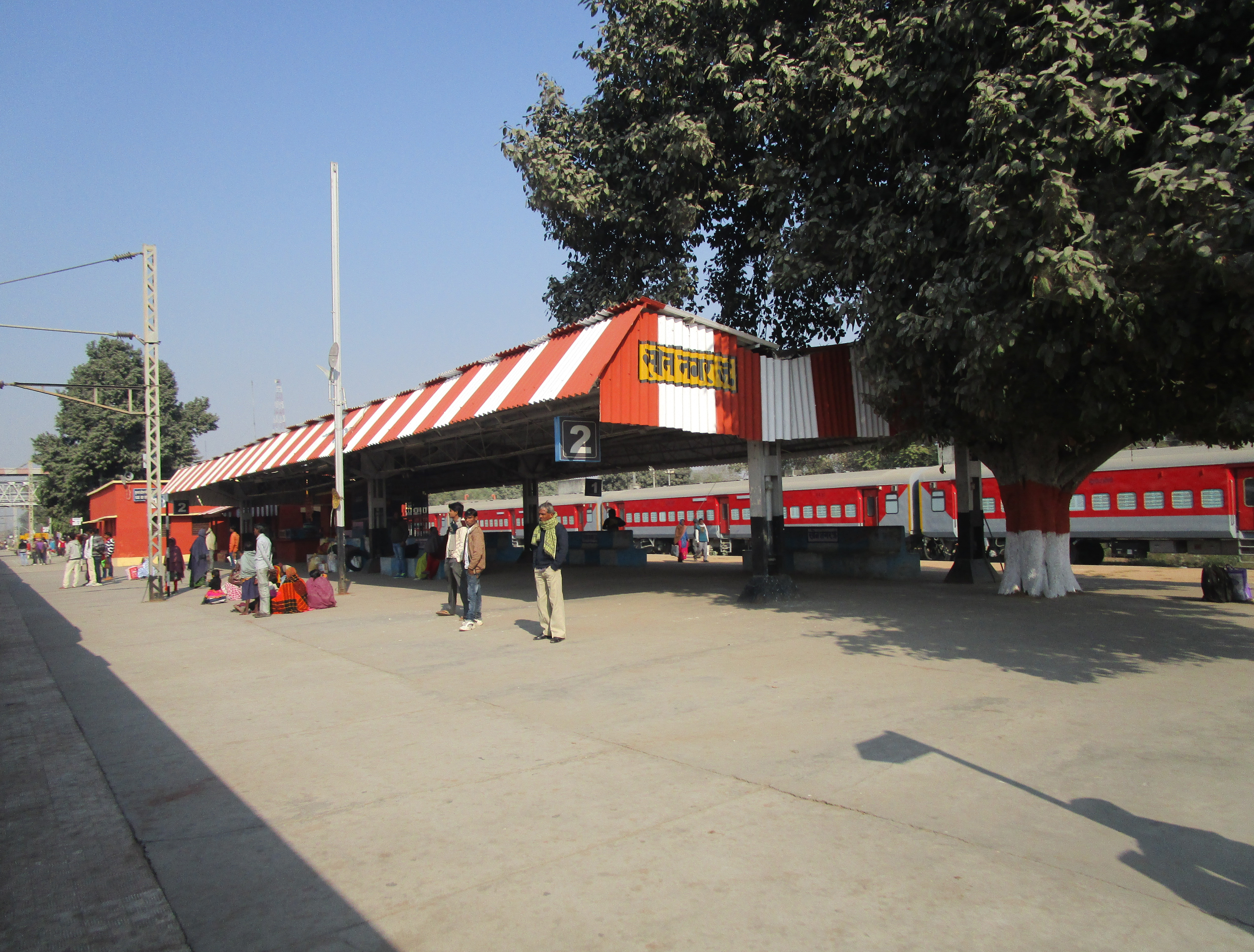
Son Nagar railway station platform no. 2

The Upper Soane Bridge, connecting Son Nagar and Dehri-on-Sone across the Son River, was completed in 1900. The 3,064-metre (10,052 ft) bridge was then the longest bridge in India. Work on the Grand Chord line of East Indian Railway was completed in 1901. It was formally inaugurated in 1907.

A branch line was opened from Son East Bank, as Son Nagar was then known, to Daltonganj in 1902.

== Freight corridor ==
Son Nagar is expected to be connected with Ludhiana as part of the Eastern Corridor. The primary feeder routes for this will be from Son Nagar to Durgapur via Gomoh, Son Nagar to Tatanagar via Garhwa Road, and Barkakana to Bokaro via Chandrapura.

Preceding station	Indian Railways	Following station
Chiralia towards ?	East Central Railway zone Gaya–Mughalsarai section	Dehri-on-Sone towards ?
Terminus	East Central Railway zone Barkakana–Son Nagar line	Bagaha Bishnupur towards ?
