= Jawaharlal Nehru Port =

Container port in Maharashtra, India

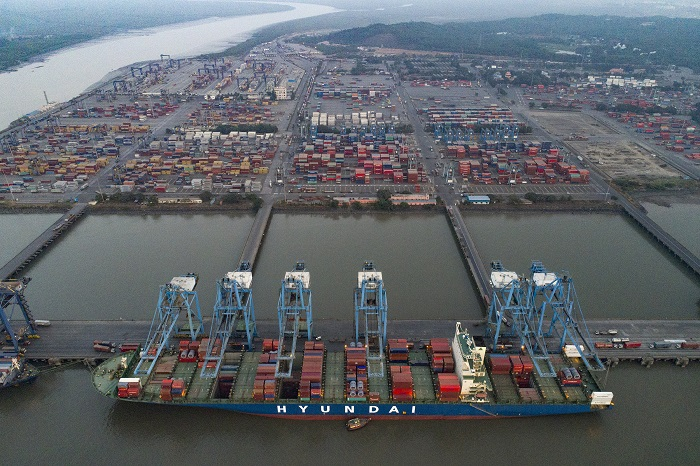
- The port along with Belpada Canal on the top left and an HMM container ship docked at bottom
- Interactive map of Jawaharlal Nehru Port
- Location within India

Location
- Country: India
- Location: Navi Mumbai, Raigad district, Maharashtra
- Coordinates: 18°57′N 72°57′E

Details
- Opened: 26 May 1989
- Operated by: Jawaharlal Nehru Port Trust Authority
- Owned by: Government of India
- Terminals: 5

Statistics
- Annual cargo tonnage: Bulk: 7.07 million tonnes (2023-24); Container: 78.05 million tonnes (2023-24)
- Annual container volume: 5,835,650 TEUs (2023-24)
- Website jnport.gov.in

Jawaharlal Nehru Port, also known as JNPT and Nhava Sheva Port, is a large container port in India. Operated by the Jawaharlal Nehru Port Trust Authority (JNPTA), it is located on the eastern shores of Arabian Sea in Navi Mumbai, Raigad district, Maharashtra. This port can be accessed via Uran, a nodal city of Navi Mumbai. It is the main port of the Mumbai Metropolitan Region, also of Maharashtra and Western India. Its common name derives from the names of Nhava and Sheva (new sheva) villages that are situated here. It is also the terminal of the Western Dedicated Freight Corridor.

As of January 2023, the port is undergoing upgrades with the help of a loan agreement signed between the Asian Development Bank (ADB) and Nhava Sheva Freeport Terminal Private Limited (NSFTPL). The loan of $131 million will be used to improve the terminal's infrastructure, increase its container handling capacity, upgrade existing berths and yards, and install energy-efficient equipment. The upgrades aim to attract vessels and make international trade more efficient, transparent and sustainable.

== History ==
The port was established on 26 May 1989 and became the second largest and premier container handling port in India, surpassing the capacity of 4 million TEUs (Twenty-foot equivalent units) in containers between 2016 and 2021.

JNP consists of a full-fledged customs house, 30 container freight stations and connectivity to 52 inland container depots across the country. The hinterland connectivity both by rail and road is being further strengthened by ongoing projects like the Dedicated Freight Corridor (DFC), which will increase the existing train capacity from 27 to 100 trains per day; Multi-Modal Logistics Park (MMLP) and widening of the port's connecting roads. Its proximity to the cities of Mumbai, Navi Mumbai and Pune; airports, hotels, exhibition centres, etc. gives the port an edge in efficiency and promptness to address the shippers’ needs.

In 2006, the port implemented the logistics data tagging of containers.

JNPT houses logistics connectivity facilities in India, with facilitation from container freight stations and public logistics parks as well as private facilities.

=== Nhava Sheva Freeport container terminal ===
The JNP Trust (JNPT) Container Terminal was originally operated by JNPT. It has a quay length of 680 metres (2,230 ft) with 3 berths.

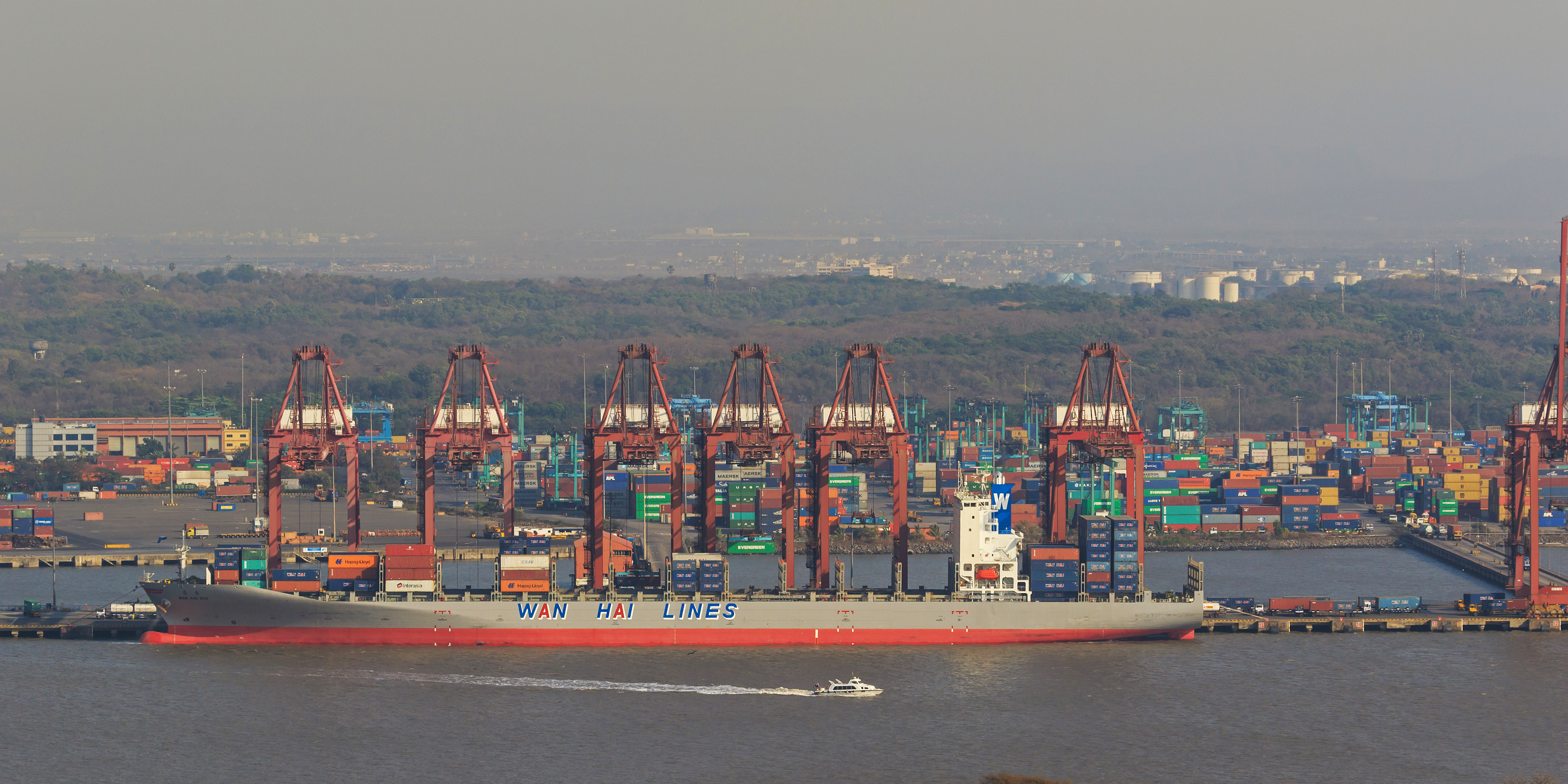
A container ship of Wan Hai Lines at JNPT in 2016

In 2023 Nhava Sheva Freeport Terminal Private Limited commenced operations of the terminal (renamed to the NSFT terminal) and plans to enhance it to handle 1.8 million TEUs by 2025.

=== Nhava Sheva International container terminal ===
The Nhava Sheva International Container Terminal (NSICT) was originally leased to a consortium led by P&O, a part of DP World. Commissioned in July 2000, it has a 600 metres (2,000 ft) quay length with two berths. It was intended to handle up to 62.15 million tonnes of cargo. NSICT was India’s first privately managed container terminal.

=== GTI-APM container terminal ===
In the year 2006, GTI (Gateway Terminals India Pvt Ltd) commissioned a third container terminal operated by APM Terminals, with the capacity to handle 1.3 million TEUs.

=== Bharat Mumbai container terminal ===
The fourth container terminal, Bharat Mumbai Container Terminal (BMCT), is developed and operated by PSA International. Phase 1 with capacity of 2.4 million TEUs was completed in Dec 2017. The terminal was planned to have full capacity of 4.8 million TEUs p.a. and a quay length of 2,000 meters with the completion of Phase 2.

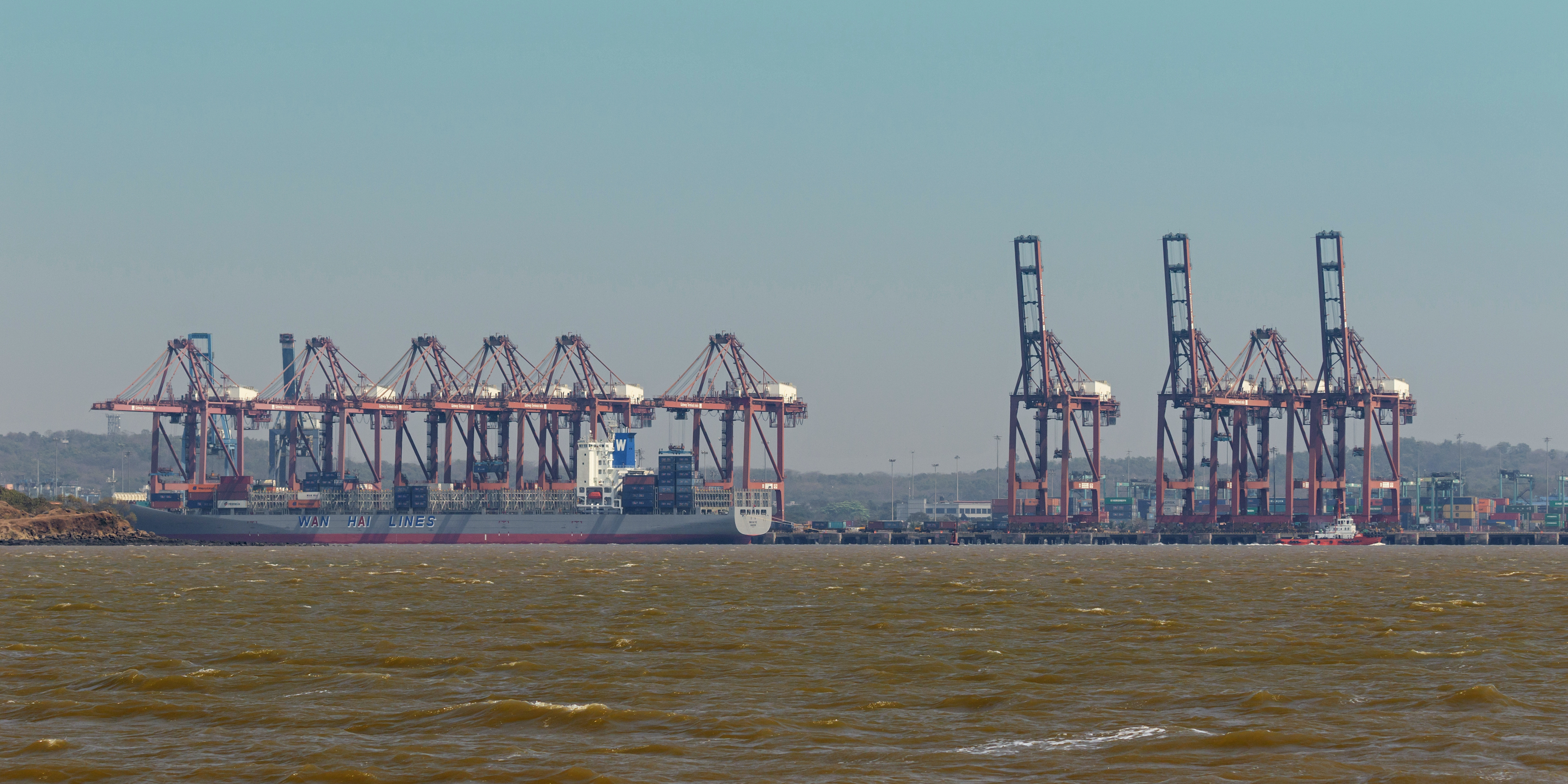
JNPT view from seaside

=== Nhava Sheva (India) Gateway container terminal ===
A new standalone container terminal by the name of NSIGT, having a quay length of 330 meters and a capacity of 0.8 million TEUs was operational in July 2016.

== Traffic ==
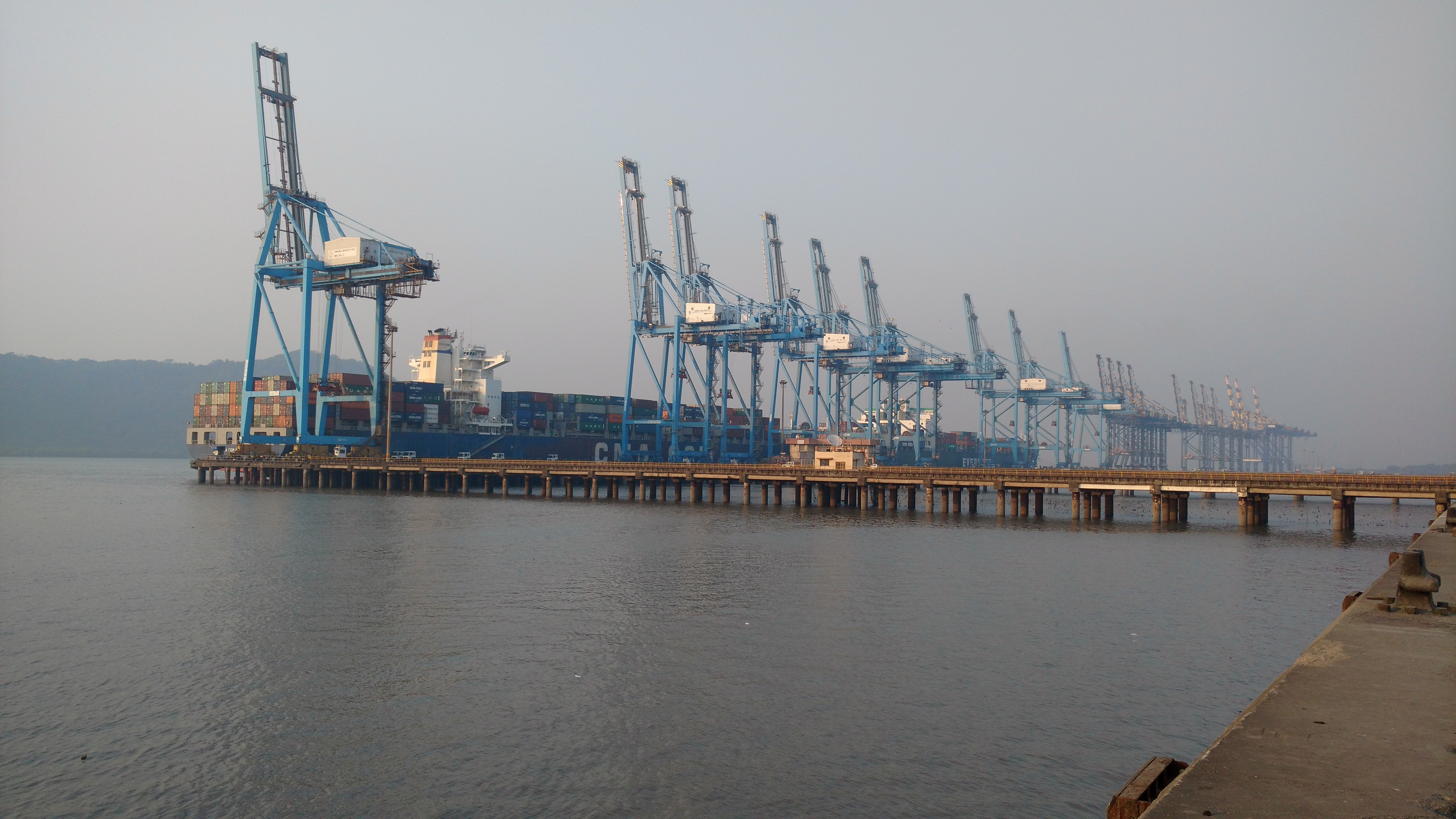
JNPT view from portside

Major exports from Jawaharlal Nehru Port are textiles, sporting goods, carpets, textile machinery, boneless meat, chemicals, and pharmaceuticals. The main imports are chemicals, machinery, plastics, electrical machinery, vegetable oils, and aluminium and other non-ferrous metals. The port handles cargo traffic mostly originating from or destined for Maharashtra, Madhya Pradesh, Gujarat, Karnataka, as well as most of North India.

== See also ==
- List of ports in India
- Mumbai Port
- Navi Mumbai International Airport
- Ports in India
- Ministry of Ports, Shipping and Waterways
- Uran
- City and Industrial Development Corporation
- Mumbai Port Trust
- Mumbai Trans Harbour Link
- Navi Mumbai
