= Chi V, Greater Noida =

Neighborhood in Uttar Pradesh, India

Chi V चाई 5
- Neighborhood
- Location within Uttar Pradesh
- Coordinates: 28°25′50″N 77°30′19″E
- Country: India
- Region: North India
- State: Uttar Pradesh
- City: Greater Noida

Government
  - Body: Greater Noida Industrial Development Authority

Languages
  - Official: Hindi, English
- Time zone: UTC+5:30 (IST)
- PIN: 201310

Chi V or Chi 5 (Hindi: चाई 5) is a residential locality in south-western Greater Noida, Uttar Pradesh, India. Bordered by Chi IV and Chi III to the east and Sector 150 A, Noida to the west, it is known to be one of the real estate hotspots of Greater Noida, alongside Omega II, Omega I, Phi I, Phi III, Phi IV, Phi II, Chi II, Chi I, Chi IV and Chi III. It is named after the Greek letter Chi.
