= Chi IV, Greater Noida =

Chi IV चि चतुर्थ Chi-4
- Neighbourhood
- Chi Sector IV, Greater Noida
- Location within Uttar Pradesh
- Coordinates: 28°25′50″N 77°30′58″E
- Country: India
- Region: North India
- State: Uttar Pradesh
- City: Greater Noida
- District: Gautam Buddha Nagar district

Government
  - Body: Greater Noida Industrial Development Authority
- Elevation: 206 m (676 ft)

Languages
  - Official: Hindi, English
- Time zone: UTC+5:30 (IST)
- PIN: 201310
- Area code: +91-120
- Vehicle registration: UP-16

Chi IV or Chi 4 is a residential locality in south-western Greater Noida, Uttar Pradesh, India. Bordered by Phi IV to the east and Chi III to the north, it is known to be one of the real estate hotspots of Greater Noida, alongside Omega II, Omega I, Phi I, Phi III, Phi IV, Phi II, Chi II, Chi I, Chi III and Chi V. It is named after the Greek alphabet Chi.
