= Phi IV, Greater Noida =

Phi IV
- Neighborhood
- Location within Uttar Pradesh
- Coordinates: 28°26′25″N 77°31′37″E
- Country: India
- Region: North India
- State: Uttar Pradesh
- City: Greater Noida

Government
  - Body: Greater Noida Industrial Development Authority

Languages
  - Official: Hindi, English
- Time zone: UTC+5:30 (IST)
- PIN: 201310

Phi IV or Phi 4 is a residential locality in south-western Greater Noida, Uttar Pradesh, India. Bordered by Phi III to the north and Chi III and Chi IV to the west, it is known to be one of the real estate hotspots of Greater Noida, alongside Omega II, Omega I, Phi I, Phi II, Phi III, Chi I, Chi II, Chi III, Chi IV and Chi V. It is named after the Greek letter Phi.
