= Chi III, Greater Noida =

Chi III
- Neighborhood
- Location within Uttar Pradesh
- Coordinates: 28°26′16″N 77°30′45″E
- Country: India
- Region: North India
- State: Uttar Pradesh
- City: Greater Noida

Government
  - Body: Greater Noida Industrial Development Authority

Languages
  - Official: Hindi, English
- Time zone: UTC+5:30 (IST)
- PIN: 201310

Chi III or Chi 3 is a residential locality in south-western Greater Noida, Uttar Pradesh, India. Bordered by Phi I, Chi II and Chi I to the north and Chi IV the south, it is known to be one of the real estate hotspots of Greater Noida, alongside Omega II, Omega I, Phi I, Phi III, Phi IV, Phi II, Chi II, Chi I, Chi IV and Chi V. It is named after the Greek letter Chi.
