= Chi II, Greater Noida =

Neighborhood in Uttar Pradesh, India

Chi II
- Neighborhood
- Location within Uttar Pradesh
- Coordinates: 28.44253°N 77.51176°E
- Country: India
- Region: North India
- State: Uttar Pradesh
- City: Greater Noida

Government
  - Body: Greater Noida Industrial Development Authority

Languages
  - Official: Hindi, English
- Time zone: UTC+5:30 (IST)
- PIN: 201310

Chi II or Chi 2 is a residential locality in south-western Greater Noida, Uttar Pradesh, India. Bordered by PSI-II to the north and Chi II to the south, it is known to be one of the real estate hotspots of Greater Noida, alongside Omega II, Omega I, Phi I, Phi III, Phi IV, Phi II, Chi I, Chi III, Chi IV and Chi V. It is named after the Greek letter Chi.
