= Modi Mall =

Shopping mall in Noida, India

Modi Mall (formerly Spice World and Smart Bharat)
- Location: Noida, Uttar Pradesh, India
- Coordinates: 28.5863°N 77.3413°E
- Address: I-2, Sector 25A, Noida, Uttar Pradesh, India 201301
- Num. of stores: 50+
- Floor area: 150,000 sq ft (14,000 m^{2})
- Floors: 7
- Parking: Available
- Website: www.modimall.in/shop.asp

Modi Mall, formerly named Spice World Mall and Smart Bharat Mall, is a shopping mall in Noida, Uttar Pradesh, India. The mall was opened in 2013 and is adjacent with Noida Cricket Stadium.

Cinepolis India operates a multiplex in the mall.

== See also ==
- The Great India Place
- List of shopping malls in India
