= Shaheed Vijay Singh Pathik Sports Complex =

Cricket stadium in Jaypee greens

- Interactive map of Shaheed Vijay Singh Pathik Sports Complex

Ground information
- Location: Jaypee greens Greater Noida, Uttar Pradesh, India
- Country: India
- Coordinates: 28.47047°N 77.51994°E
- Establishment: 2013
- Capacity: 8,000
- Owner: Greater Noida Industrial Development Authority
- Operator: Greater Noida Industrial Development Authority
- Tenants: Afghanistan national cricket team
- End names
- Far End; Pavilion End

International information
- First men's ODI: 15 March 2017: Afghanistan v Ireland
- Last men's ODI: 24 March 2017: Afghanistan v Ireland
- First men's T20I: 8 March 2017: Afghanistan v Ireland
- Last men's T20I: 10 March 2020: Afghanistan v Ireland

Team information
| Afghanistan national cricket team | (2015-present) |
- As of 10 March 2020; Source: ESPNcricinfo

The Shaheed Vijay Singh Pathik Sports Complex or Greater Noida Sports Complex Ground is a cricket and association football stadium in Greater Noida, in Uttar Pradesh state of India. It has served as a home ground of the Afghanistan national cricket team. In 2017, it lost its status to hold any matches conducted by the Board of Control for Cricket in India (BCCI), after staging a private league which was not permitted by BCCI.

The stadium is named after Vijay Singh Pathik, an Indian revolutionary who fought against British rule. The stadium conforms to the specifications prescribed by International Cricket Council (ICC) with associated amenities like media and corporate boxes, medical facilities, merchandise stores, a food court, an information kiosk and many others. In December 2016, the ICC gave approval for the ground to host international matches between Full Member teams.

== History ==
Uttar Pradesh Cricket Association secretary Rajeev Shukla in November 2009 said the Jaypee Group, who are developing a Sports city in Greater Noida are building a cricket stadium there and UPCA has already inked a fifty-year agreement with them to hold matches. At that time, he added that stadium will be ready by 2011 and would hold Twenty20 and One-Day International matches. Initially, the spectator capacity at the stadium will be 40,000 which would be increased to 100,000.

The stadium had discussions with ICC to give it a status for holding Tests and One Day International matches. Previously, the stadium qualified for holding all matches except Tests and ODIs, but later confirmed to host any international match.

It is also the home ground of the Afghanistan cricket team. However, the seating capacity of the stadium is currently 8,000 with no current plans to upgrade it to what was initially planned.

Shukla said they were ready to take Green Park Stadium on lease from the state government but they have not been successful in convincing the authorities. He said they were looking for a land between Kanpur and Lucknow to have their own stadium.

It is built as per the latest ICC specifications and guidelines, and is named Shaheed Vijay Singh Pathik Sports Complex. The stadium is fully equipped with all the facilities with floodlights, a bowling alley, an indoor stadium, lawn tennis courts in the premises. The stadium is located near YMCA and Jaypee Resorts in Greater Noida. The stadium hosted its first ever Ranji Trophy match between Uttar Pradesh cricket team and Baroda cricket team from 1 to 4 December 2015.

Greater Noida has hosted the 2016 Duleep Trophy matches. All the matches were played with pink ball under lights.

== Home ground for Afghanistan ==
The stadium became the home ground for the Afghanistan cricket team after they decided to shift their home ground from Sharjah. The stadium hosted 2015–17 ICC Intercontinental Cup match between Afghanistan cricket team and Namibia cricket team in April 2016 as Afghanistan beat Namibia by an innings and 36 runs.

On 25 July 2016, it was announced that Afghanistan will host a full series against Ireland at this stadium. Besides a 4-day Intercontinental cup match, Ireland and Afghanistan played 5 ODIs and 3 T20Is in March 2017. Afghanistan won both T20I series 3–0, and ODI series 3–2.

The ground was also set to host its first ever Test match between Afghanistan and New Zealand in September 2024. However the Test was abandoned without a single ball being bowled due to a wet outfield on days one and two, followed by heavy rain. This was only the eight instance of a Test match being abandoned without where single ball being bowled.

The ground will no longer host international cricket due to poor drainage and has been revoked by the ICC.

== International Centuries ==
The following table summaries the centuries scored at Shaheed Vijay Singh Pathik Sports Complex, Greater Noida.

=== ODIs ===
| No. | Score | Player | Team | Balls | Inns. | Opposing team | Date | Winning team |
|---|---|---|---|---|---|---|---|---|
| 1 | 119 | William Porterfield | Ireland | 98 | 2 | Afghanistan | 15 March 2017 | Afghanistan |
| 2 | 101 | Asghar Stanikzai | Afghanistan | 90 | 1 | Ireland | 17 March 2017 | Afghanistan |
| 3 | 108* | Rahmat Shah | Afghanistan | 128 | 2 | Ireland | 24 March 2017 | Afghanistan |

== List of Five Wicket Hauls ==
| Symbol | Meaning |
|---|---|
| † | The bowler was man of the match |
| ‡ | 10 or more wickets taken in the match |
| § | One of two five-wicket hauls by the bowler in the match |
| Date | Day the Test started or ODI was held |
| Inn | Innings in which five-wicket haul was taken |
| Overs | Number of overs bowled. |
| Runs | Number of runs conceded |
| Wkts | Number of wickets taken |
| Econ | Runs conceded per over |
| Batsmen | Batsmen whose wickets were taken |
| Drawn | The match was drawn. |

=== ODIs ===
Five-wicket hauls in ODIs at Shaheed Vijay Singh Pathik Sports Complex
| No. | Bowler | Date | Team | Opposing Team | Inn | Overs | Runs | Wkts | Econ | Batsmen | Result |
|---|---|---|---|---|---|---|---|---|---|---|---|
| 1 | Paul Stirling | 17 March 2017 | Ireland | Afghanistan | 1 | 10 | 55 | 6 | 5.50 | Samiullah Shenwari; Mohammad Nabi; Gulbadin Naib; Rashid Khan; Shafiqullah Shafiq; Dawlat Zadran | Lost |
| 2 | Rashid Khan | 17 March 2017 | Afghanistan | Ireland | 2 | 9.3 | 43 | 6 | 4.52 | Paul Stirling; Niall O'Brien; William Porterfield; Gary Wilson; Andy McBrine; Peter Chase | Won |

=== T20Is ===
Five-wicket hauls in T20Is at Shaheed Vijay Singh Pathik Sports Complex
| No. | Bowler | Date | Team | Opposing Team | Inn | Overs | Runs | Wkts | Econ | Batsmen | Result |
|---|---|---|---|---|---|---|---|---|---|---|---|
| 1 | Rashid Khan | 10 March 2017 | Afghanistan | Ireland | 2 | 2 | 3 | 5 | 1.50 | Kevin O'Brien; Gary Wilson; Lorcan Tucker; Greg Thompson; Barry McCarthy | Won |

== See also ==
- Greater Noida
- 2016–17 Duleep Trophy
- Noida Cricket Stadium
- Tehra Cricket Stadium
