= Bhagwantpur =

- Village
- Interactive map of Bhagwantpur
- Coordinates: 28.109555°N 77.519456°E
- Country: India
- State: Uttar Pradesh
- District: Gautam Budh Nagar
- Elevation: 189 m (620 ft)

Population (2011)
  - Total: 1,241

Languages
  - Official: Hindi
- Time zone: UTC+5:30 (IST)
- PIN: 203135
- Telephone code: 05738
- Vehicle registration: UP16 XXXX
- Nearest city: Noida, Palwal

Bhagwantpur is a village in Gautam Buddha Nagar district of the Indian state of Uttar Pradesh. Bhagwantpur and Chhatanga are two small villages under the gram panchayat of Jewar Tehsil.

== Demographics ==
Bhagwantpur village had a total population of 1,241 at the 2011 census, with 231 families residing in the village. The sex ratio of village was 667 male, 574 female.
