= Bhangel =

- Location in Uttar Pradesh, India
- Coordinates: 28.54°N 77.38°E
- Country: India
- State: Uttar Pradesh
- District: Gautambudh Nagar
- Established: 1975

Government
  - Type: Nagar Panchayat
- Elevation: 92 m (302 ft)

Population (2014)
  - Total: 175,890 (Approx)

Languages Hindi & Hariyanwi A local version of Hindi, Shri Ramcharit Manas was written by Tulasidas in Awadhi.
  - Official: Hindi
- Time zone: UTC+5:30 (IST)
- 201304 PIN: [201304]
- Telephone code: 0120
- Vehicle registration: UP 16
- Sex ratio: 860 ♂/♀

Bhangel is a semi-urban neighborhood in Noida, in Gautam Buddh Nagar district of the Indian state of Uttar Pradesh.It was established by brahman Community years ago.

The 5.5km Bhangel elevated road over Dadri-Surajpur-Chhalera (DSC) Road was completed in July 2025. The construction was started in 2020. It was built at a cost of Rs. 608 crore and was opened in November 2025. During the works in April 2025, the Barola cross was temporarily closed.
