= Greater Noida Press Club =

Journalists' organization in India

Greater Noida Press Club is a social organization of journalists from Noida, Greater Noida and Delhi NCR. It works for journalists' professional, social and economic development. The aim of the organization is to develop high standards in journalism and protect the rights of journalists. Greater Noida Press Club was established on 24 July 2003.

== About ==
Founded on 24th of July, 2003
Office: J267, J Block, Beta 2, Greater Noida, Uttar Pradesh

== Shabd Madhu ==
Shabd Madhu is the mouthpiece of Greater Noida Press Club. Articles from top journalists of our Press Club are being published in this magazine.
