= Sports Box =

Indian restaurant chain

- Company type: Wholly owned subsidiary
- Industry: Restaurants
- Genre: Sports bar
- Founder: Sunil Biyani
- Headquarters: Mumbai; Noida; Indore; Siliguri; Bangalore
- Number of locations: 5
- Area served: India
- Website: Official Site

Sports Box, shortened to SBX, is an Indian restaurant chain focusing on sports theme based casual dining. Sports Box was founded by Sunil Biyani, brother of Kishore Biyani, head of Galaxy Entertainment.

== Location ==
Sports Box has locations in Mumbai, Bangeluru, Siliguri, Noida, Indore. The chain would open in Jaipur and Ajmer. In Mumbai, SBX is located in Neptune Magnet Mall. In Bhandup and in Noida, it is located in The Great India Place.

== Design ==
The design for the pub is rustic where primary colours are black and grey, with red accents. Shruti Chaudhari, head architect of Chrysalis Studio, contributed to the design of SBX. SBX has games such as a pool tables, basketball cage, dartboards and punching bags.

== Menu ==
The food and drinks are named after the famous sports personalities. Captain Cool and Maria Sharapova Mocktail are the names of a few drinks.
