= Greater Valley School, Greater Noida =

- Greater Noida; Uttar Pradesh; India

Information
- Type: Primary, Middle, Secondary
- Motto: Ignite. Empower. Achieve
- Established: 2008
- School district: Gautam Buddha Nagar
- Chairperson: Sudhir Shukla
- Principal: Anamika Sood
- Staff: 100
- Enrollment: 1000
- Classes: Nursery to class XII
- Campus: Sector Omega-II, Greater Noida
- Campus size: 25 acres
- Affiliation: CBSE
- Website: greatervalleyschool.com

Greater Valley School, Greater Noida, a.k.a. GVS, Greater Noida, is located in the district of Gautam Buddha Nagar, in Sector - Omega II, Greater Noida city. The school is affiliated to the Central Board of Secondary Education, New Delhi from class Nursery to XII. The current principal is Anamika Sood.

== History ==
The school was established in 2008. GVS Greater Noida is divided into three wings: junior, middle and senior school. It has around 1,000 students and 100 faculty members.

== Academics ==
The school follows curriculum designed by the Central Board of Secondary Education. Subjects taught are English, Hindi, math, EVS, science, social science, Sanskrit, French and German as third language, physics, chemistry, mathematics, physical education, economics, psychology, accounts, business studies, information practices, political science, history, geography.

== Co-curricular activities ==
A wide range of co-curricular activities are organized to supplement the academic programme, such as Art & Craft Club, Music (Vocal and instrumental), Indian and Western Dance, Activity clubs, Quiz club, Taekwondo, Skating, Yoga, Public Speaking, Dramatics, Book club, Cooking without fire, Clay modeling, German Club, Theater, Kathak Dance, Robotics club and many more.
