= Noida Cricket Stadium =

Cricket ground

- Noida Stadium
- Location: Noida, Uttar Pradesh
- Country: India
- Coordinates: 28.589441°N 77.339451°E
- Establishment: 2013
- Capacity: 25,000
- Owner: Noida Authority
- Tenants: Uttar Pradesh cricket team

Noida Cricket Stadium, also known as Noida Stadium Complex, is a cricket stadium in Noida, India. It is located in Sector 21A of Noida, Uttar Pradesh. As of April 2017, the playing area and the stands for the stadium have been built, with the seating and media facilities still being completed.

The stadium has played host to various local and corporate matches and the Noida Authority is looking to stage first-class games soon. Former Indian cricketer, Madan Lal is acting as the consultant for the cricket stadium. The authority had decided to upgrade the Noida stadium in 2012 and started work on a cricket stadium in 2013. It had promised to complete the work by the end of March, 2016. The construction work of the stadium has been delayed many times now with a deadline of 2023. The stadium being upgraded to host international matches. After upgradation the stadium will become the third international venue for cricket in Delhi NCR. This will increase the number of venues in the NCR from two to three including the Feroz Shah Kotla Ground in Delhi and Greater Noida Sports Complex in Greater Noida.

In October 2025, the stadium hosted the first edition of the Sanatan Cricket League, a charity-based cricket tournament.

Panoramic View

== See also ==
- Greater Noida Cricket Stadium
- Tehra Cricket Stadium
