= Greater Noida railway station =

Railway station in India

General information
- Coordinates: 28.5076°N 77.5638°E
Location
- Location within Uttar Pradesh Location within India

Greater Noida railway station (code: BRKY), formerly known as Boraki railway station or Bodaki railway station, is a railway station in Greater Noida in Delhi NCR in Uttar Pradesh state of India. It lies on Delhi Mumbai Industrial Corridor, Eastern Dedicated Freight Corridor, and the under-construction Eastern Orbital Rail Corridor-Haryana Orbital Rail Corridor (EORC-HORC) ring railway around Delhi.

== History ==
During 1863–64, this station and rail line were constructed by the East Indian Railway Company when the Howrah–New Delhi main line was extended westward and the Kanpur–Delhi section was completed in 1864.

== Train services ==
As of 2025, it is a small station with 3 platforms and 3 tracks (a triple electric-line) on the Kanpur–Delhi section of Howrah-New Delhi main line.

== Future development ==
The government plans to upgrade the Greater Noida junction in to Delhi NCR's world-class largest train hub and create a multi modal transport hub (MMTH) over an area of 400 acres at the cost of ₹1,625 cr excluding the cost of land provided free by GNIDA, including train, metro and buses in the following two zones:

- Zone-1 Multi-model Transport and Commercial Hub: which will have 12.5 acre Inter-State Bus Terminal (ISBT) and Local Bus Terminal (LBT), 5.5 acre metro transit hub, and 65 acre commercial and retail hub.
  - Boraki-IGI Metro route: It will connect the Greater Noida railway station to IGI Airport, via Pari Chowk, Badarpur, Delhi, Tughlakabad, Khanpur and Mehrauli before terminating at the IGI airport, through high-speed metro rail (max speed 160 km/h) which will cover the distance in about 40 minutes. Noida Metro's Aqua Line will be extended from the existing Depot Station metro station (Noida) to the future Greater Noida railway metro station. Then passengers from Greater Noida railway station can interchange from Noida's Aqua Line to Delhi Metro's Magenta Line at Botanical Garden metro station till Kalindi Kunj metro station where they will interchange again with the under-construction Delhi's Golden Line which goes to the Delhi IGI Airport's Delhi Aerocity metro station.
- Zone-2 Railway, Retail and Hotel hub with multi-level parking and overbridge: railway hub over 137 acres with 13 platforms and 98 track lines including 63 yard lines for the train maintenance. To reduce the congestion at Anand Vihar Terminal railway station, over 70 eastward trains to Uttar Pradesh, Bihar, and West Bengal will be relocated here.

== Present status ==
- 2025 Aug: Survey negotiations with farmers for the land acquisition was underway.

== See also ==
- Transport in Delhi NCR
  - Transport in Delhi
  - Transport in Haryana
  - Transport in Uttar Pradesh
- Major airports in Delhi NCR
  - Indira Gandhi International Airport (IGI Airport), 65 km west of Greater Noida railway station
  - Noida Airport (Jewar Airport), is 50 km south of Greater Noida railway station
  - Hindon Airport (civil enclave at Air Force Station), 40 km northwest of Greater Noida railway station
  - Hisar Airport, 250 km northwest
- Bijwasan railway station
