= Mahvalipur =

Mahvalipur Mohablipur
- Village
- Location in Uttar Pradesh, India Mahvalipur (India)
- Coordinates: 28.1560°N 77.668°E
- Country: India
- State: Uttar Pradesh
- District: Gautam Buddha Nagar
- Subdistrict: Jewar
- Founder: Gusai Baba (Khere wale)
- Elevation: 195 m (640 ft)

Population (2011)
  - Total: 1,422

Languages
  - Official: Hindi
  - Other official: Urdu
- Time zone: UTC+05:30 (IST)
- Pincode: 203135
- Telephone code: 05738
- Vehicle registration: UP-16
- Website: www.gbnagar.nic.in

Mahvalipur, also called Mohablipur, is a village and a Gram Panchayat in Gautam Budh Nagar district in the Indian state of Uttar Pradesh. The population was 1,422 at the 2011 Indian census.

== Location ==
Mohablipur is located in the suburbs of Jewar about 7 km about 67 km from Noida, 47 km from Greater Noida, 40 km from Gautam Buddha University and 35 km from Khair. It is situated on the northeast bank of the Yamuna River. It lies 195 metres (640 ft) above mean sea level.
