= Chipyana Buzurg =

Urban village in Uttar Pradesh, India

Coordinates: 28.625°N 77.450°E

Chipiyana Buzurg is an urban village in the Indian state of Uttar Pradesh, located in district Gautam Buddha Nagar. It is situated adjacent to NH 24 and just 500 meters away from ABES IT college.

The Chipiyana Buzurg urban village has two ponds, the first pond is for fishing and the second famous pond is dog bite pond, it's an ancient belief that when anybody gets bitten by a dog, they can get cured if they take a bath in the pond.

The District headquarters at Noida is 2 kilometres (1.2 mi) to the north. Delhi Meerut Exp Way is just 700 meters from this place.

According to the 2011 census of India, Chipiyana Buzurg has population of 17400, with a notable literacy rate of 85.12%, which is higher than the state average.

== Transportation ==
The railway station at Chipyana Buzurg is closest to the village. Ghaziabad Junction railway station is about 5 km away. Shaheed Sthal Metro station is about 7 km away and Noida electronic city is about 8 km from Chipiyana Buzurg.
