= Arjun Bhati =

Indian amateur golfer (born 2004)

Personal information
- Nationality: India
- Born: 7 September 2004 (age 22) Noida, India
- Height: 177 cm (5 ft 10 in)

Career
- Sport: Golf
- Status: Amateur

Arjun Bhati (born 7 September 2004) is an Indian amateur golfer. He is from Greater Noida, won the FCG Callaway Junior World Golf Championships 2019. He is a golf prodigy, an amateur golfer. 40 countries and 637 golfers had participated in the tournament. Arjun secured the first position with 199 strokes in the three-day final.

Arjun Bhati is an emerging champion of Indian golf history, he has won Junior World Golf Championships 2018. Arjun has won several championships in various world golf tournaments.

Arjun was in the news for donating ₹4.30 lakhs to the PM-CARES relief fund, which he raised by selling 102 trophies he had been awarded.
