= Bisrakh =

Indian village in western Uttar Pradesh

Bisrakh Jalalpur
- Village
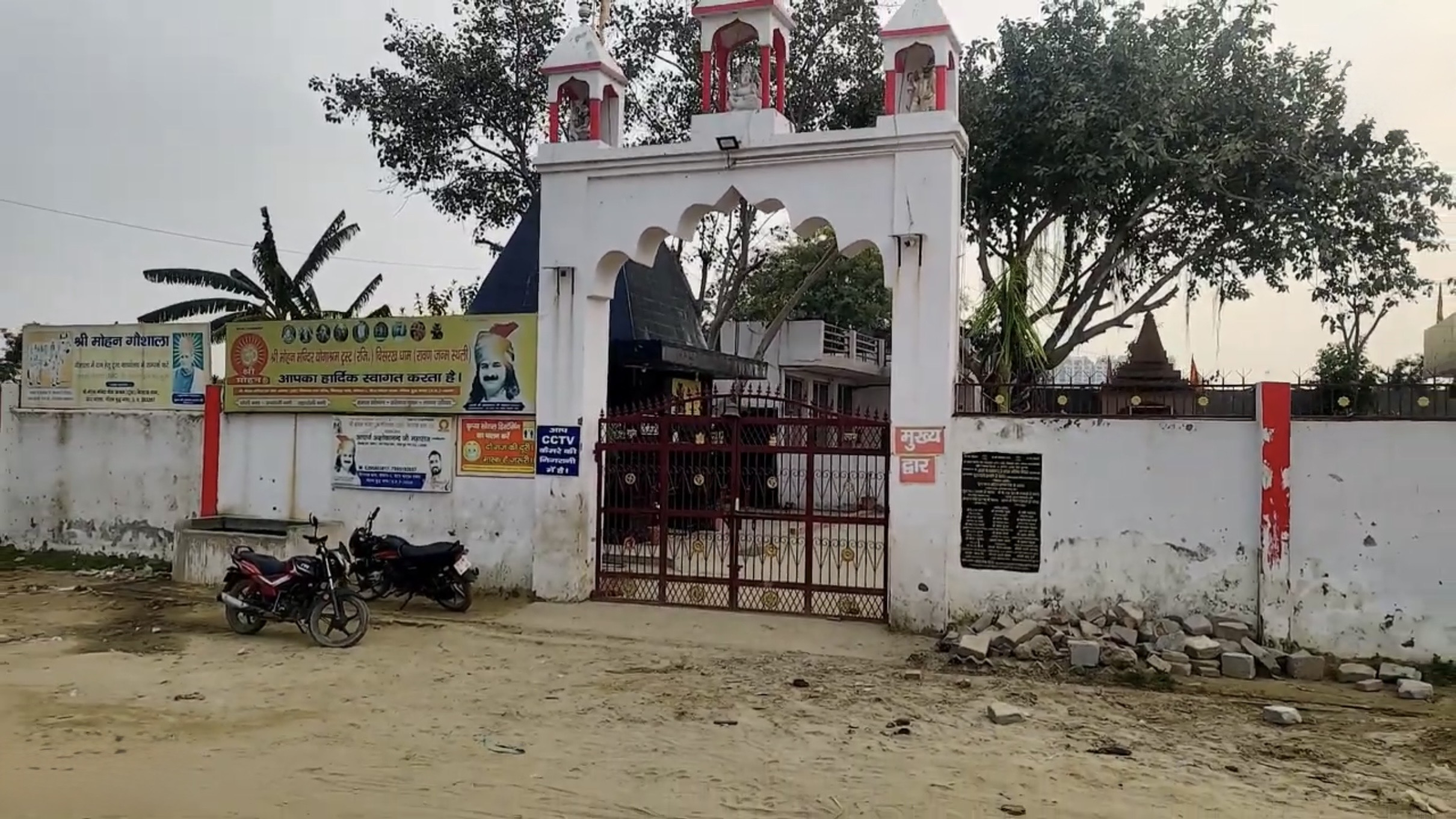
- Ravana Temple in Bisrakh

- Location within Uttar Pradesh Location within India
- Coordinates: 28.571298°N 77.432116°E
- Country: India

'Bisrakh Jalalpur' is a village near Kisan Chowk in Greater Noida (West), India. It is a part of Gautam Buddha Nagar district of Uttar Pradesh state. This village is said to be the birthplace of the king Ravana, who ruled Lanka in the epic Ramayana.

During the Dussehara festival, which celebrates Rama's victory over Ravana, effigies of Ravana are burnt in several parts of India. However, in Bisrakh, the nine days of Navratra ending in Dassehara are observed as a period of mourning when they offer prayers for peace to the soul of Ravana and perform Yagna. Locals believe that if Ramlila were to be performed in the village, it would trigger the wrath of Ravana on the villagers.

== Location ==
Bisrakh Jalalpur is a small village, in the Gautam Budh Nagar district which adjoins the urban center of Greater Noida, and which still retains an ancient layout consisting of narrow lanes, dirty and potted roads. It is the headquarters of the administrative center of Bishrak Block in western Uttar Pradesh. It is 30 kilometres (19 mi) away from the national capital, New Delhi.

== Legends ==
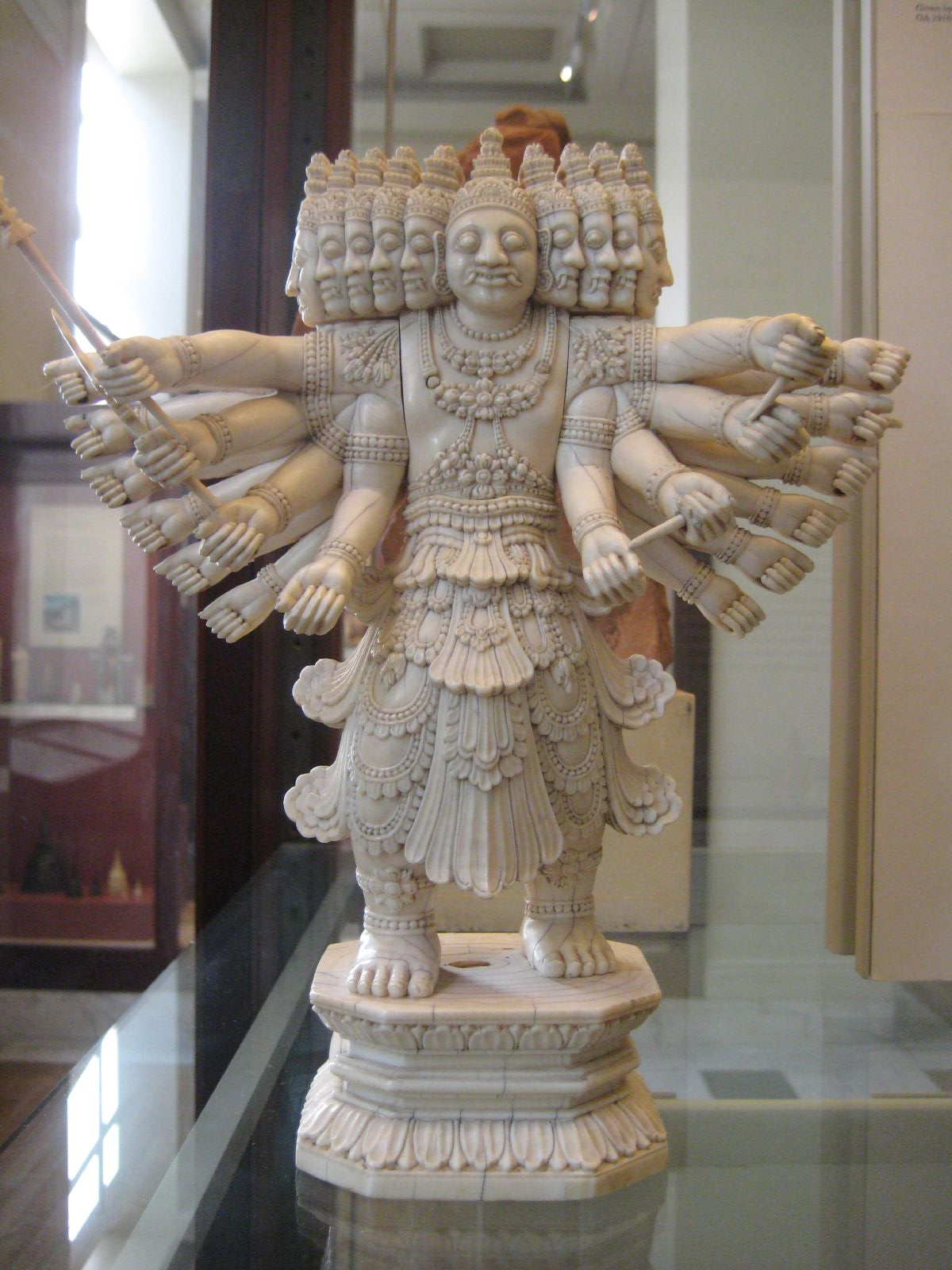
Ravana

According to a local legend, the name of the village is a derivation of Vishravas, father of Ravana, who was a famous sage of the ancient times who lived and worshipped Shiva in this village. Ravana who was born in this village had spent his early childhood here. Vishravas had found a linga in the forest area and had established the Bisrakh Dhaam (abode of God) with the linga deified therein where he offered worship.

According to Hindu mythology, Vishravas, a Brahmin, had wedded Kaikesi, a rakshasa princess; Ravana thus had a mix of Brahmin and rakshasa (not demon in Indian mythology, as a rakshasa cannot be literally translated to demon) blood. Vishravas's elder son by his first wife was Kubera, now worshipped as a god of wealth, who ruled Lanka until Ravana became the king himself.

According to local belief celebrations of Ramlila in Bisrakh would invite the wrath of Ravana. Instead, fire sacrifices or Yajnas are held during Navratri festival to the Shiva linga praying homage to Ravana.

== Temples ==
Several temples exist in the village that are over 1,000 years old. The Swayambhu (self manifest) Shiva linga, which was worshiped by Ravana and his father Vishravas, was unearthed more than 100 years ago. It is octagonal in shape. The linga is visible above the surface for 2.5 feet (0.76 m) height and a further 8 feet (2.4 m) length is said to extend below the ground. It is deified in a temple here and worshipped daily. The temple is set near a large banyan tree and has a courtyard laid with marble.

A new temple dedicated to Ravana is under construction at a cost of Rs 2 crores. This temple will be deified with a 42 feet (13 m) Shiva Linga and a 5.5 feet (1.7 m) image of Ravana.

== Demographics ==
According to 2011 Census, the village has a total population of 5,470 (24.31% consist of Scheduled Caste) population of 882 families; 2,921 are males and 2,549 females with an average sex ratio of 767 much less than the Uttar Pradesh state average of 902. Literacy rate is 77.58% which is higher than the state's figure of 68.01%.

== Economy ==
The economy of the village and the Bishrakh Block was mainly agriculture to the extent of 70% with the balance 30% related on non-agricultural activities of people such as teachers, administrative and police officials, politicians, carpenters, shopkeepers, barbers, and also agricultural labour. The village, compared to the rest of the Block, has non-farmer elitists, and elite farmers who own land area of 40 bighas or more, with the richest farmer owning 300 bighas. However, the economy is still considered "subsistence level." for the village as a whole.

== Bibliography ==
- Sachchidananda, Sachchidananda (1980). Elite and Development. Concept Publishing Company. pp. 160–. GGKEY:2QLJ09TPF3U.
- Vasudevan, Vandana (22 November 2013). Urban Villager: Life in an Indian Satellite Town. SAGE Publications. ISBN 978-81-321-1783-4.
