= Worlds of Wonder (amusement park) =

Water park and amusement park in Noida, India

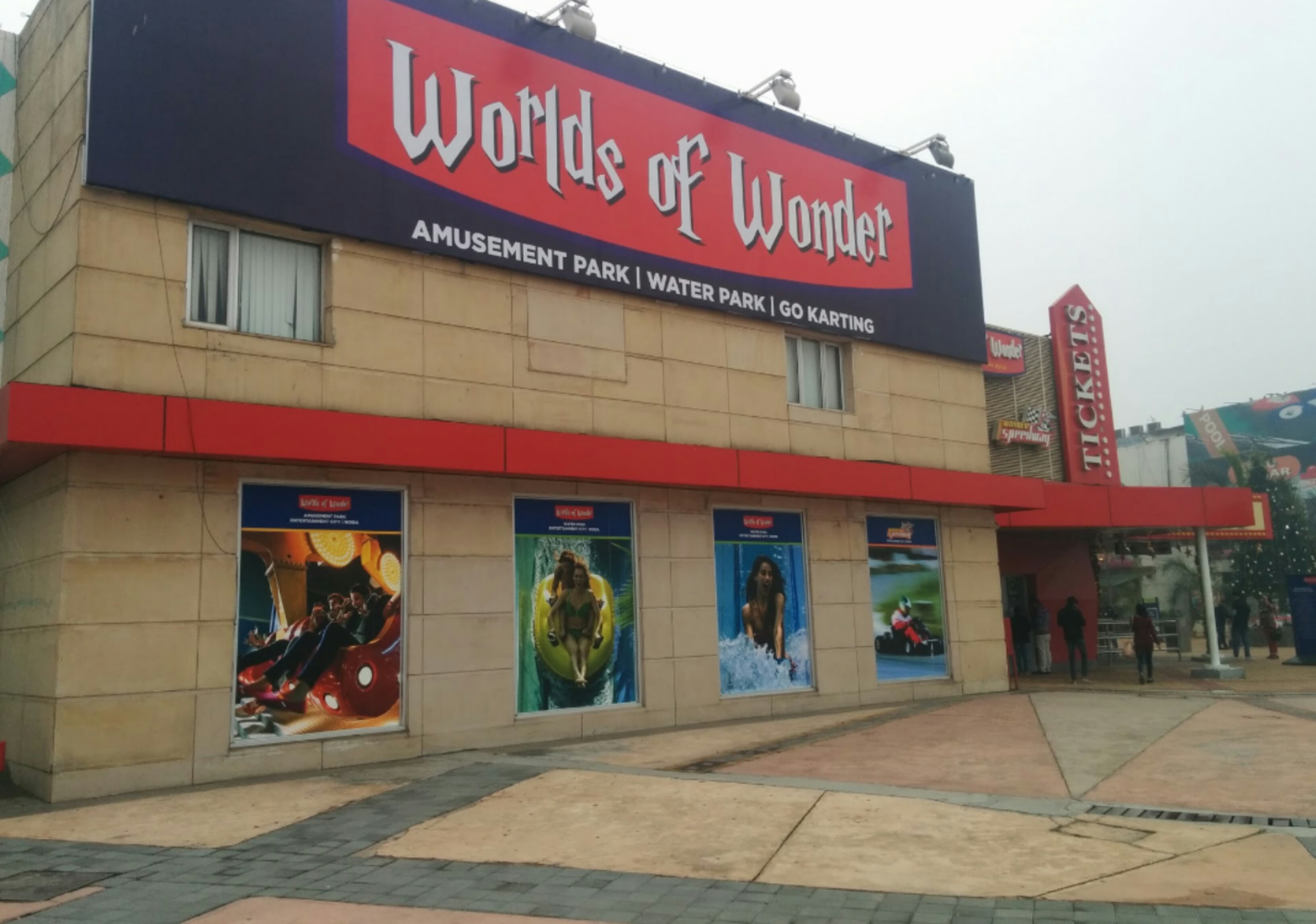
- Worlds of Wonder water and amusement park
- Interactive map of Worlds of Wonder
- Location: Entertainment City, adjacent to The Great India Place mall, Noida, Uttar Pradesh, India
- Coordinates: 28°33′52.93″N 77°19′24.92″E
- Theme: Water Park and Amusement Park
- Owner: Entertainment City
- Operated by: Entertainment City
- General manager: Amit Gupta
- Opened: 2007
- Operating season: Year-round
- Area: 50.04 acres (20.25 ha)
- Website: www.worldsofwonder.in

Worlds of Wonder is a water and amusement park located in Noida, Uttar Pradesh, India. The Park is owned and operated by Entertainment City Limited, a joint venture of International Amusement Limited and Unitech Holdings Ltd.

== History ==
The park opened in mid 2007 and includes over 20 rides, water park and go-kart.

In August 2023, the shareholders of Entertainment City Limited expressions of interest for the complete sale of the company. The sale encompasses the entire complex, including the Worlds of Wonder amusement and water parks.

== Park ride details ==
- Amusement Park (Teen Zone): operational since September, 2007
- Amusement Park (Family & Children's Zone): operational since December, 2008
- Arrival Village: operational Since December, 2009
- WOW Lake: operational since August, 2012
- Water Park: operational since August, 2013
- Go Karting: operational since January, 2014
