= Phi I, Greater Noida =

Phi I फ़ाई 1
- Neighborhood
- Location within Uttar Pradesh
- Coordinates: 28°26′52.9″N 77°30′59″E
- Country: India
- Region: North India
- State: Uttar Pradesh
- City: Greater Noida
- District: Gautam Buddha Nagar district

Government
  - Body: Greater Noida Industrial Development Authority

Languages
  - Official: Hindi, English
- Time zone: UTC+5:30 (IST)
- PIN: 201310

Phi I or Phi 1 (Hindi: फ़ाई 1) is a residential locality in south-western Greater Noida, Uttar Pradesh, India. Bordered by Omega I to the north and Phi II to the east, it is known to be one of the real estate hotspots of Greater Noida, alongside Omega II, Omega I, Phi II, Chi I Chi II and Chi III . It is named after the Greek letter Phi.
