= Greater Noida Industrial Development Authority =

Nodal agency that administers the city of Greater Noida in Uttar Pradesh, India

Agency overview
- Formed: 28 January 1991; 35 years ago
- Jurisdiction: Government of Uttar Pradesh
- Motto: Planned with an obsession
- Agency executives: Alok Tandon, Chairman; Narendra Bhooshan, CEO
- Parent agency: Department of Infrastructure and Industrial Development
- Website: www.gnida.up.gov.in/en/

Greater Noida Industrial Development Authority (GNIDA), simply sometimes Greater Noida Authority and at times shortened to GreNo Authority, is a nodal agency and planning authority solely responsible for the administration of Greater Noida city in the Gautam Buddha Nagar district of the Indian state of Uttar Pradesh. It comes under the Uttar Pradesh government's Department of Infrastructure and Industrial Development.

Established in January 1991 by the Government of Uttar Pradesh during the First Mulayam Singh Yadav ministry under the UP Industrial Area Development Act, 1976, it is responsible for the city's overall planning, development, maintenance, regulation and operation and is among the nine industrial development authorities of Uttar Pradesh.

== History ==
Greater Noida Industrial Development Authority was established as a statutory authority on 28 January 1991 by the Government of Uttar Pradesh during the First Mulayam Singh Yadav ministry in accordance with the UP Industrial Area Development Act, 1976, which mandates that every UP city must have a municipal authority of its own.
