= Jaypee Sports City =

Indian sports-themed development

- JSC
- Location in Uttar Pradesh
- Address: Dankaur; India
- Location: Dankaur, Uttar Pradesh
- Coordinates: 28°20′50.26″N 77°32′2.22″E
- Owner: Jaypee Group
- Operator: Jaypee Sports International Limited
- Main venue: Buddh International Circuit; Capacity: 110,000

Construction
- Groundbreaking: 2009
- Cost: S$1.3 billion est.
- Architects: Skidmore, Owings & Merrill, Peter Ellis New Cities, Hermann Tilke

Tenants
- Indian Grand Prix, Uttar Pradesh cricket team, Punjab Warriors

Jaypee Sports City is a sports complex located along the Yamuna Expressway near Greater Noida, Uttar Pradesh. It is India's first town developed and aimed for sports. It's 5,000 acres of area comprises various sports venues like international standard cricket stadium, a hockey stadium and an international circuit for F1 races.

== Facilities ==
=== Cricket ===
A cricket stadium is under construction. When completed, it will seat 40,000 spectators, with a planned expansion to a capacity of 100,000. Cricket Stadium will be given a face lift similar to Lord's Cricket Ground. The stadium scheduled to be ready in 2022. The stadium will conform to norms and specifications prescribed by ICC with associated amenities like media and corporate boxes, medical facilities, merchandise stores, a food court, an information kiosk and many others.

=== Field hockey ===
There will also be a hockey stadium named Jaypee Sport City Hockey Stadium with a sports training academy and infrastructure for other sports.

=== Racing ===
Buddh International Circuit hosted India's first ever F1 Grand Prix in 2011. It was the seventeenth round of the 2011 Formula One season and the first Formula One Grand Prix to take place on the Indian subcontinent and even the circuit is the first of its kind in South Asia. The second Formula One Indian Grand Prix was held in October 2012 which was won by Red Bull Racing Driver Sebastian Vettel, his second consecutive win. The third Formula One Indian Grand Prix was held in October 2013 which was also won by Red Bull Driver Sebastian Vettel, his third consecutive win in India.

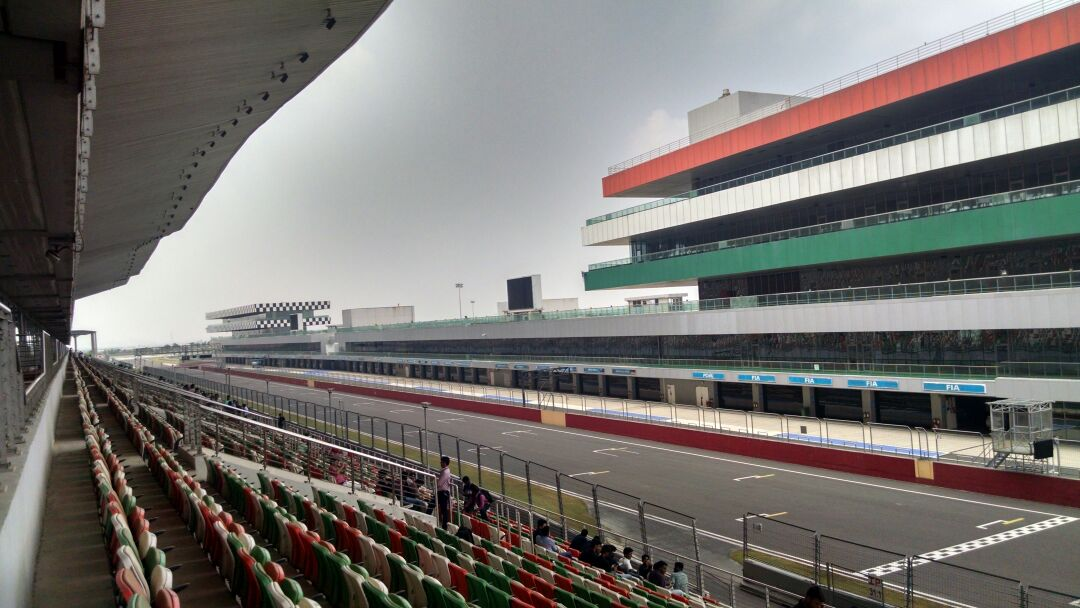
Image of Buddh international Circuit showing the race circuit, paddock and gallery.

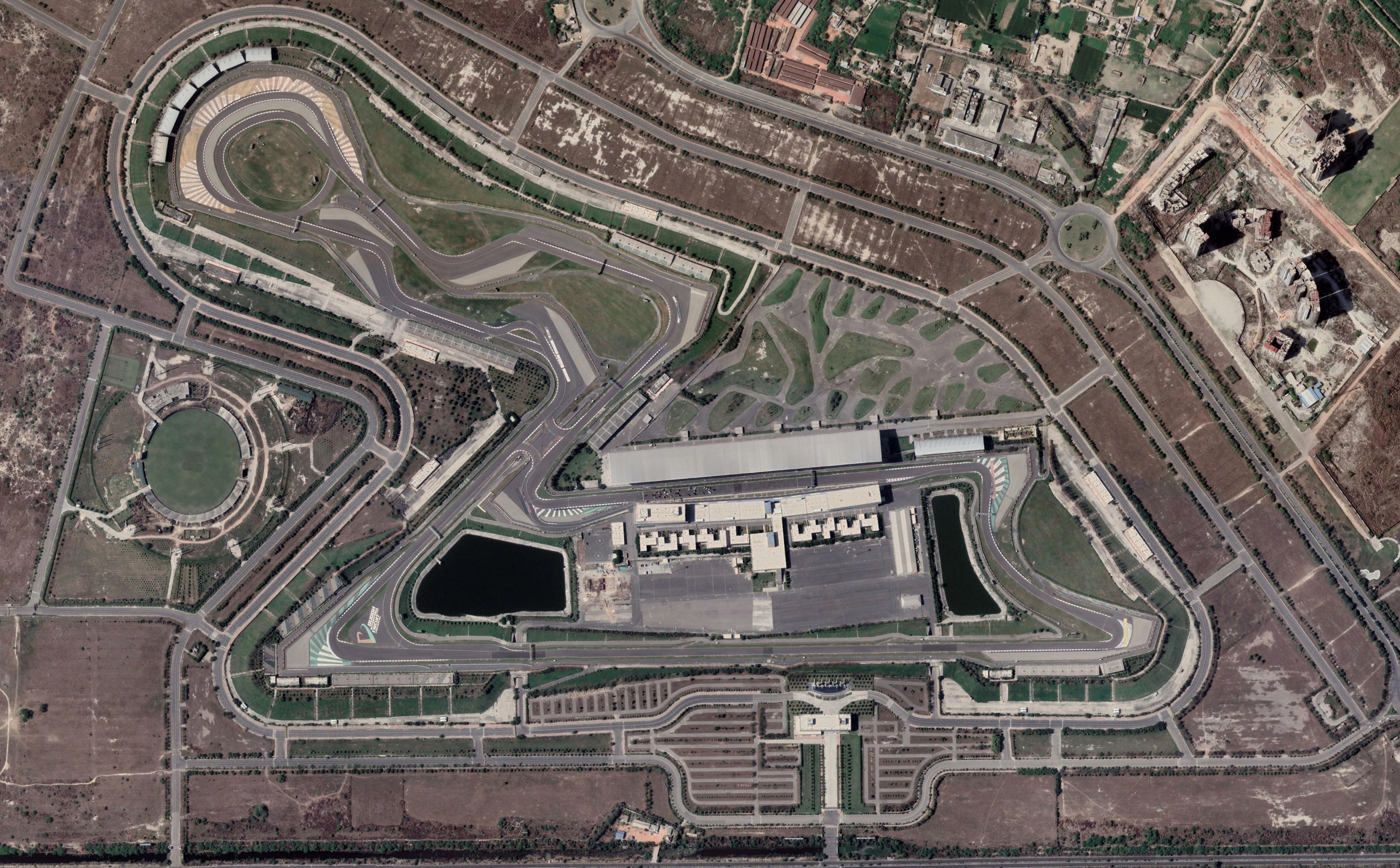
An Aerial image of the circuit, as it appeared in 2021

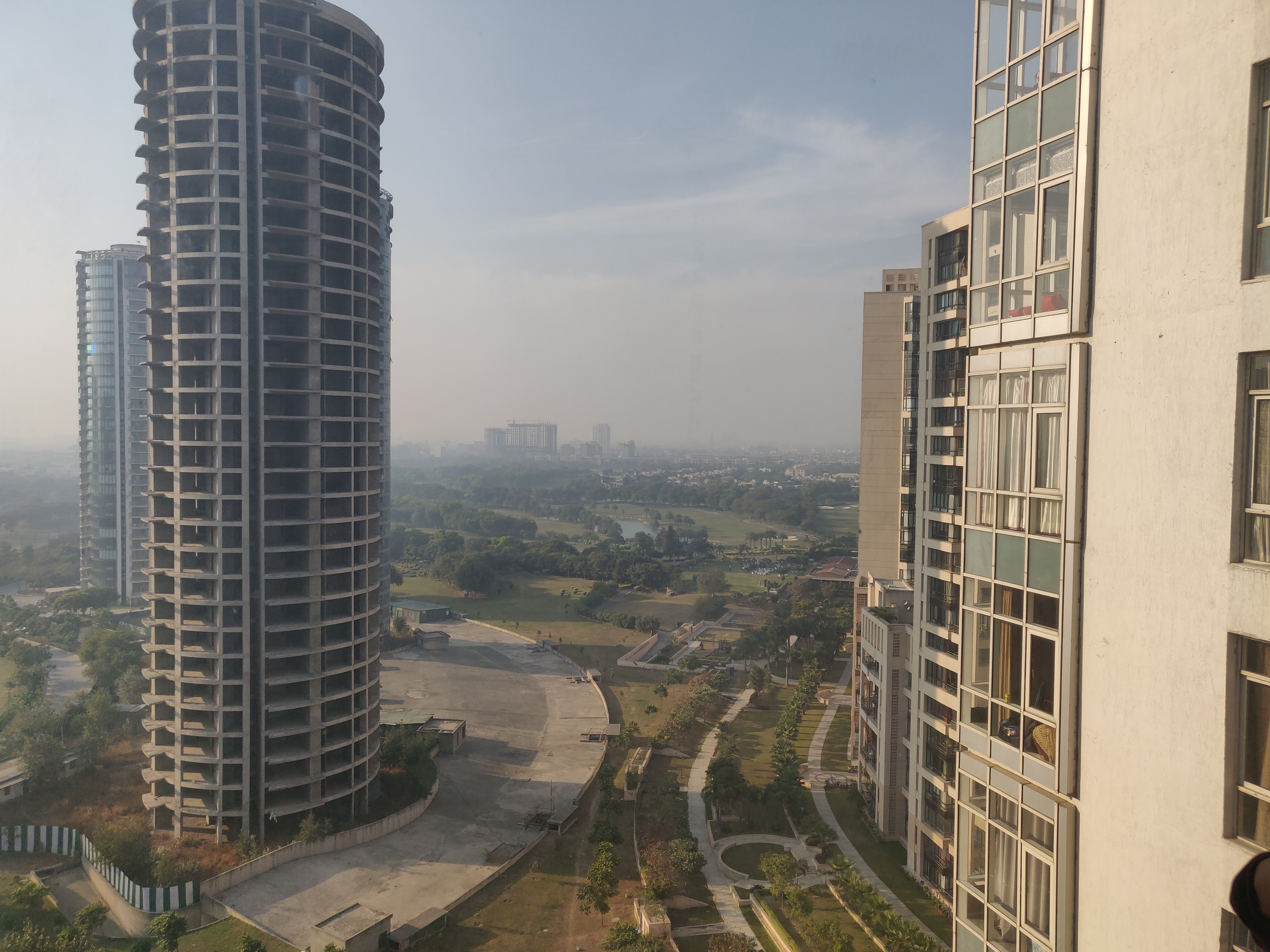
A view of Jaypee Greens Sports City

=== Other ===
Apart from sports there will be Financial Centre, Entertainment Centre, Education Centre, Residential area and Civil Centre for commercial / retail / residential uses.
