= The Great India Place =

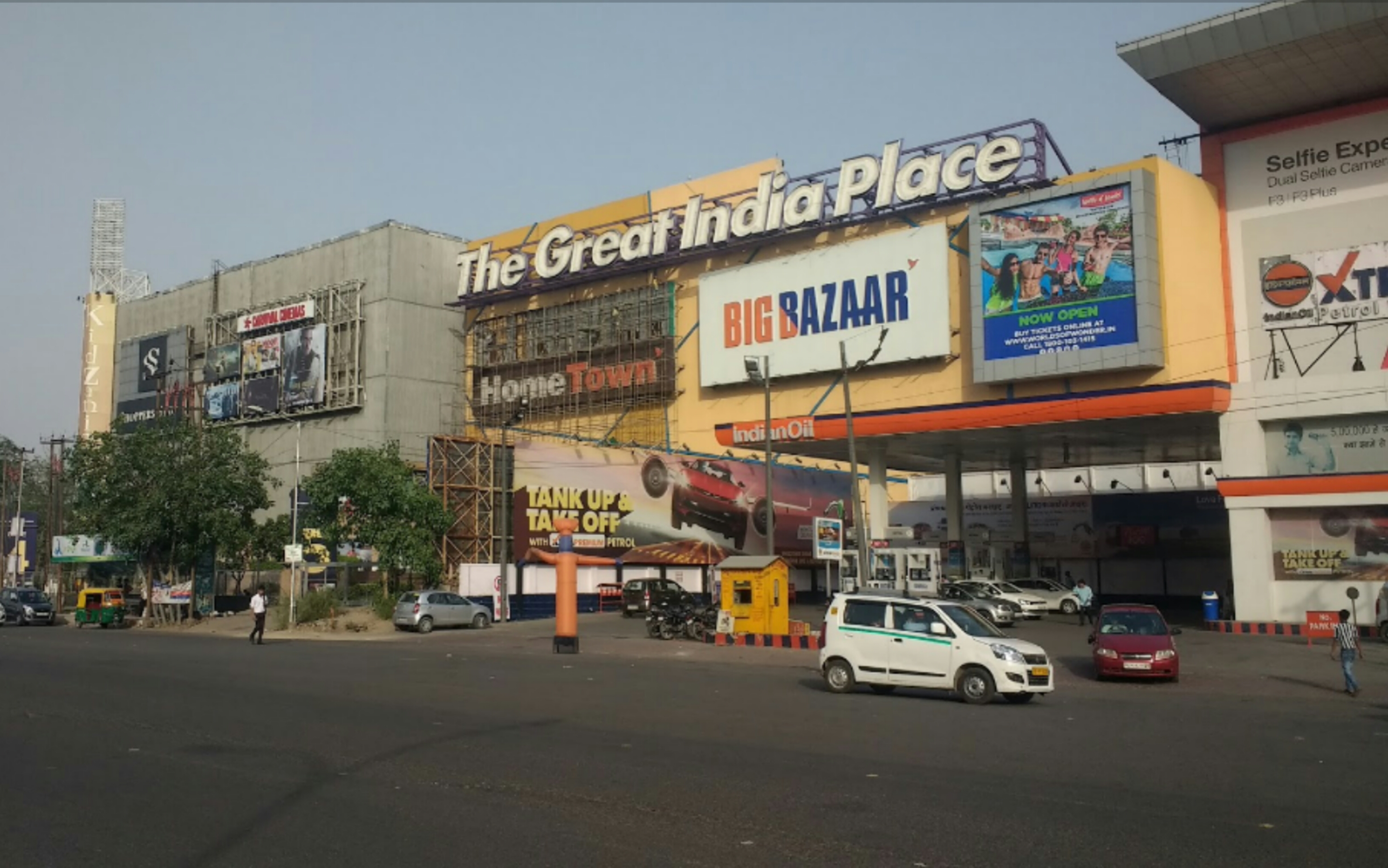
- GIP Mall, Noida
- Location: Sector-38A, Noida, Uttar Pradesh, India
- Coordinates: 28.5684°N 77.3258°E
- Opened: 2007
- Architect: Unitech Group
- Num. of stores: 258
- Num. of anchor tenants: 10
- Floor area: 1,000,000 sq ft (93,000 m^{2})
- Floors: 4
- Parking: 10,000+ vehicles
- Website: thegreatindiaplace.in

The Great India Place is a shopping mall in Noida, Uttar Pradesh, India. It is popularly known as GIP Mall. It is one of the largest malls in the country. The mall features a wide selection of national and international retail outlets. This grand shopping mall also shares its boundary with Worlds of Wonder, a major Amusement Park in the city. The Great India Place, Gardens Galleria Mall, Worlds of Wonder (WOW), Kidzania and Decathlon are all part of the larger Entertainment City Limited development on 150 acre land in the most expensive commercial hub of Noida in Delhi NCR.

== Features ==
The Great India Place was developed by the Appughar Group the Unitech Group and is maintained by Entertainment City Ltd. It is located in Sector 38-A, Noida, adjacent to Noida Sector 18 metro station. The mall opens at 10 am every day for its visitors. The mall is itself part of the larger Entertainment City amusement park Worlds of Wonder.

The mall houses a variety of retail outlets, including Shopper's Stop,Pantaloons, Smart Bazaar, Woodland and Max Lifestyle, along with international brands like Adidas, Bose, American Tourister, and Bata. The mall is divided into specific zones, with home and grocery on the basement level, women's apparel on one side, men's on the other and a 180,000 sq ft (17,000 m^{2}) food and entertainment zone on the top floor. Its six-screen Miraj Cinemas multiplex has a total seating capacity of 1220. There is also an 850 sq ft (79 m^{2}) zone dedicated to a Wedding Bazaar, and a Home Saaz section for home improvement.
