= Phi II, Greater Noida =

Phi II फ़ाई 2
- Neighborhood
- Location within Uttar Pradesh
- Coordinates: 28°27′04.3″N 77°31′13.9″E
- Country: India
- Region: North India
- State: Uttar Pradesh
- City: Greater Noida

Government
  - Body: Greater Noida Industrial Development Authority

Languages
  - Official: Hindi, English
- Time zone: UTC+5:30 (IST)
- PIN: 201310

Phi II or Phi 2 (Hindi: फ़ाई 2) is a residential locality in south-western Greater Noida, Uttar Pradesh, India. Bordered by Omega I to the north, Phi I to the west and Swarn Nagari to the east, it is known to be one of the real estate hotspots of Greater Noida, alongside Omega II, Omega I, Phi I, Phi III, Phi IV, Chi I, Chi II, Chi III, Chi IV and Chi V. It is named after the Greek letter Phi.
