= Gautam Buddha Nagar district =

Coordinates: 28.5333°N 77.3891°E

- District of Uttar Pradesh
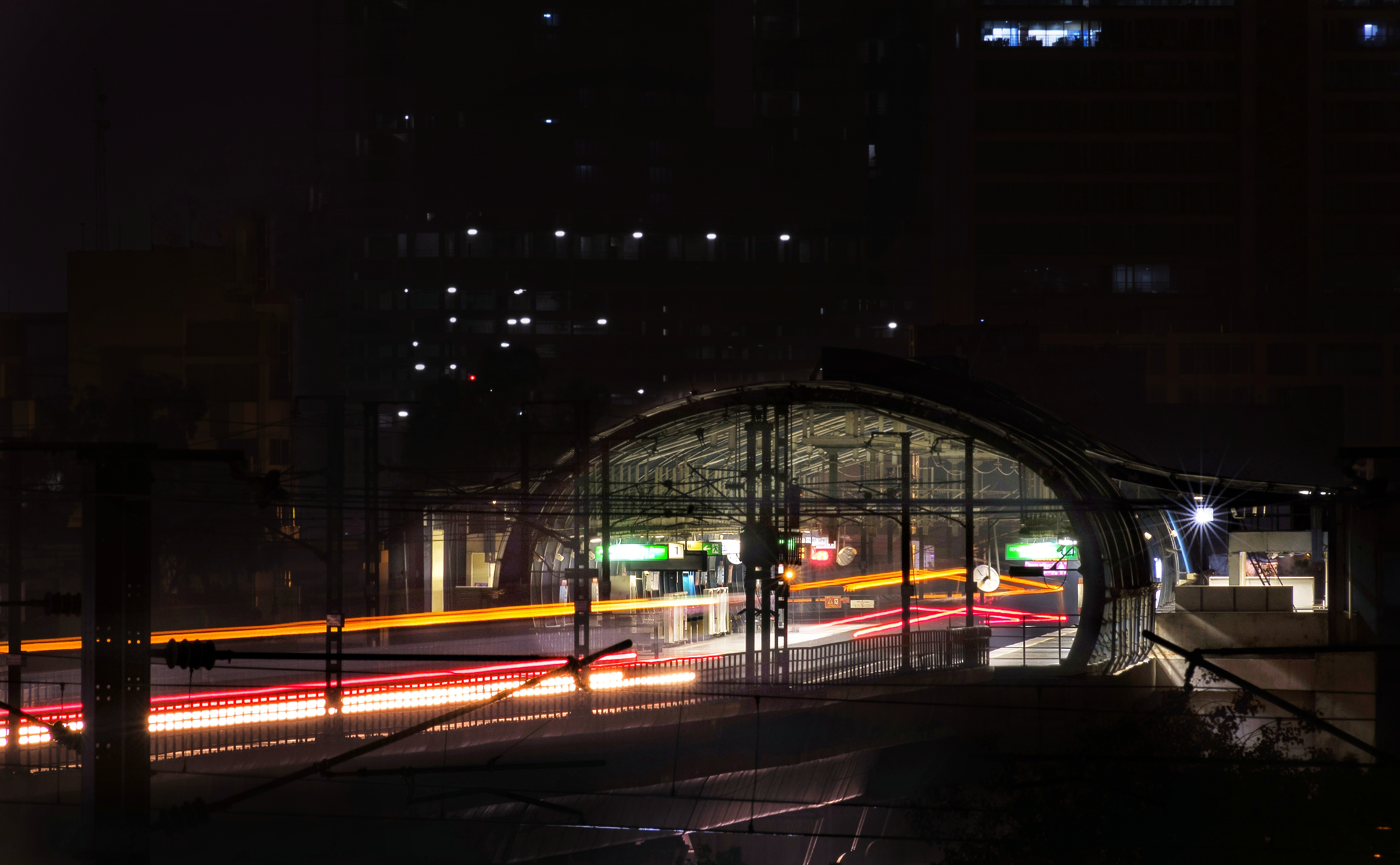
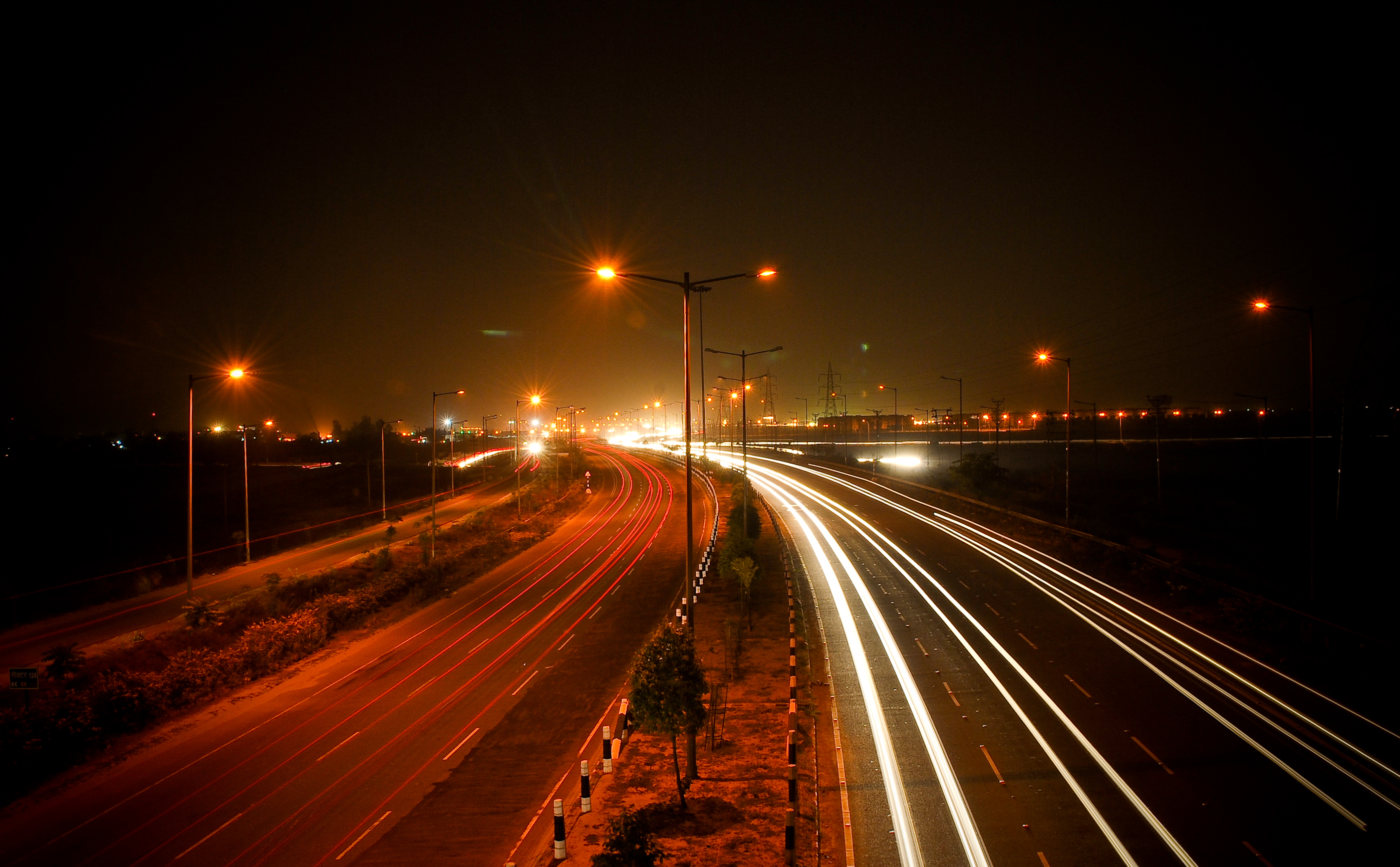
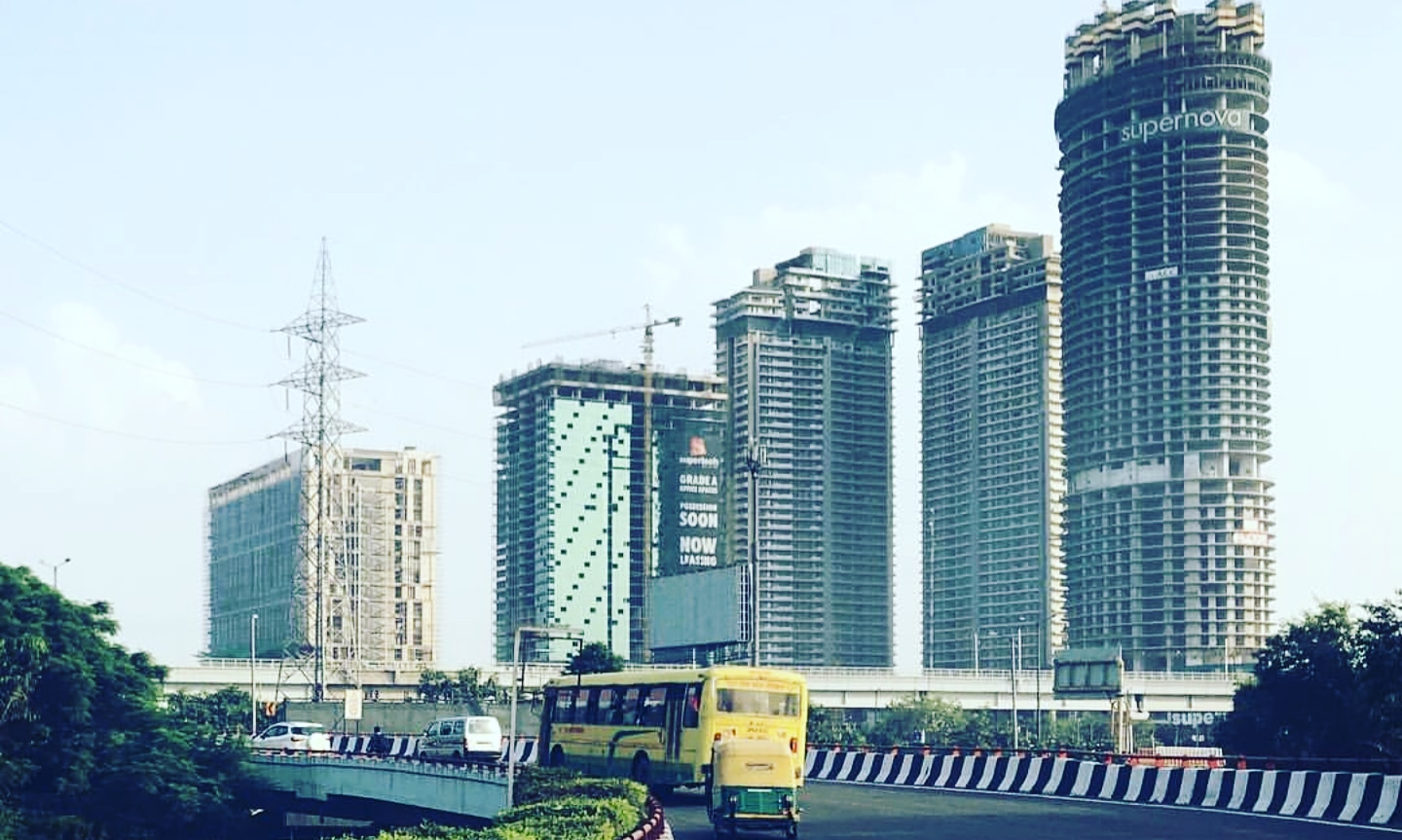
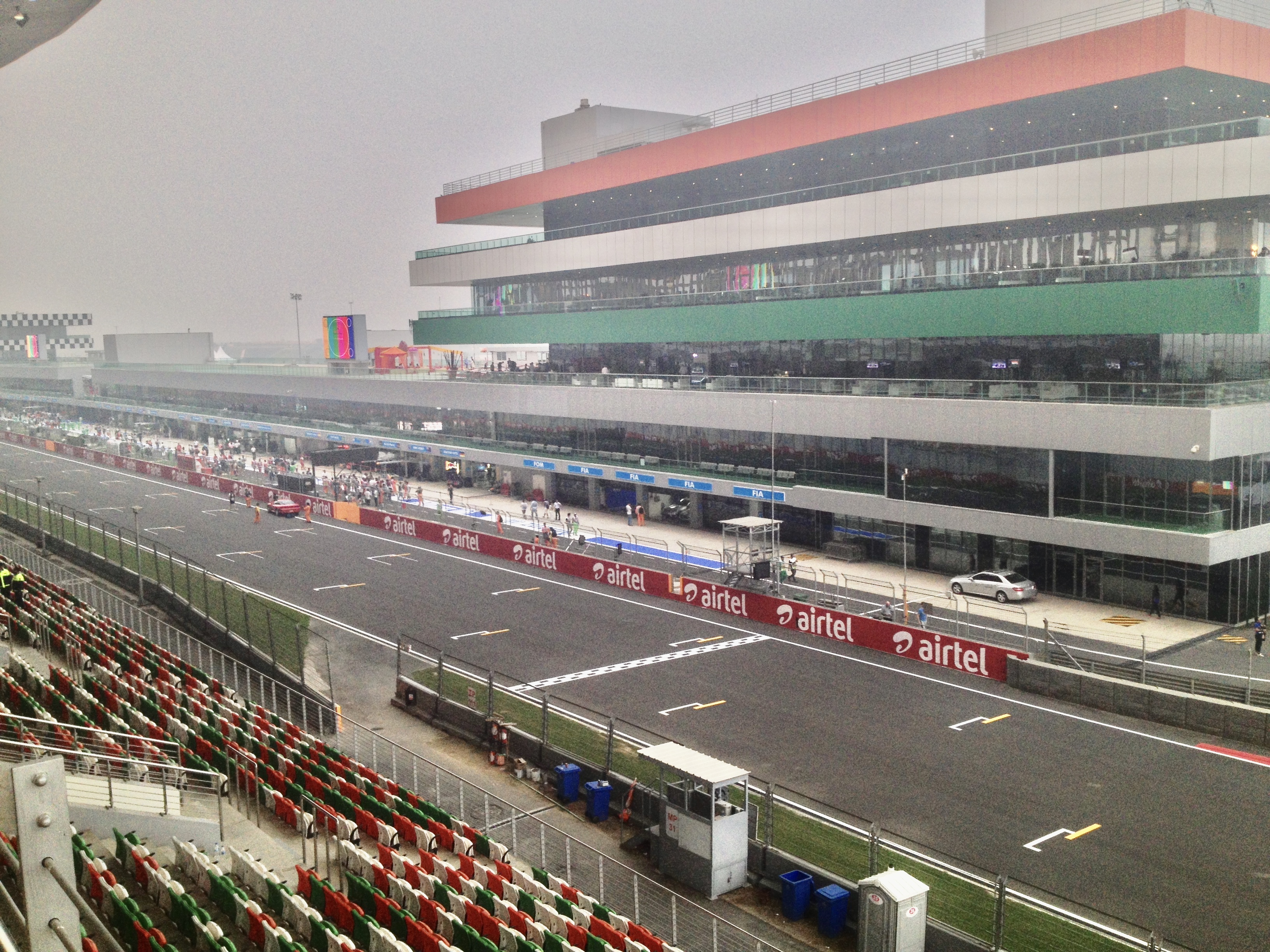
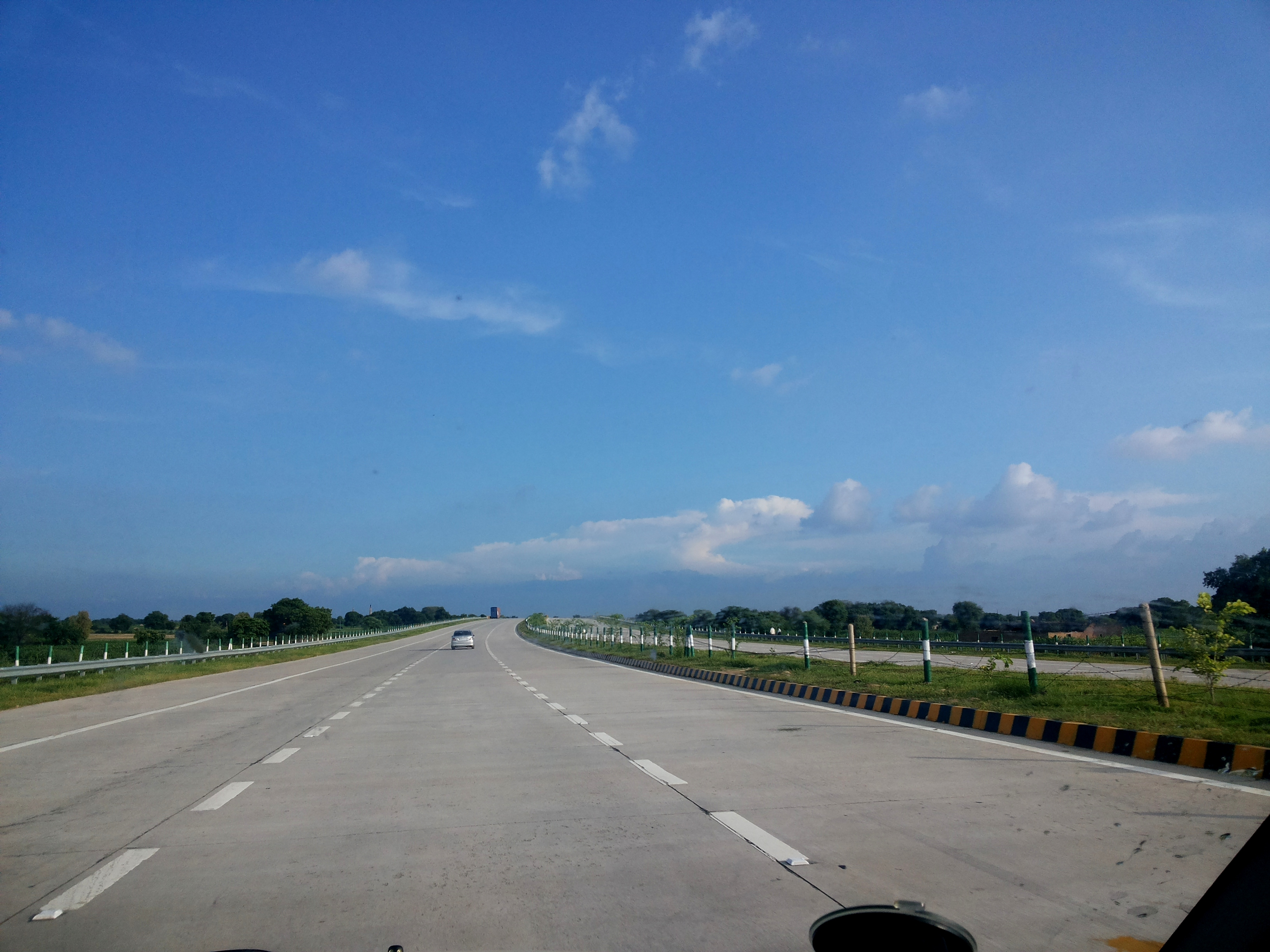
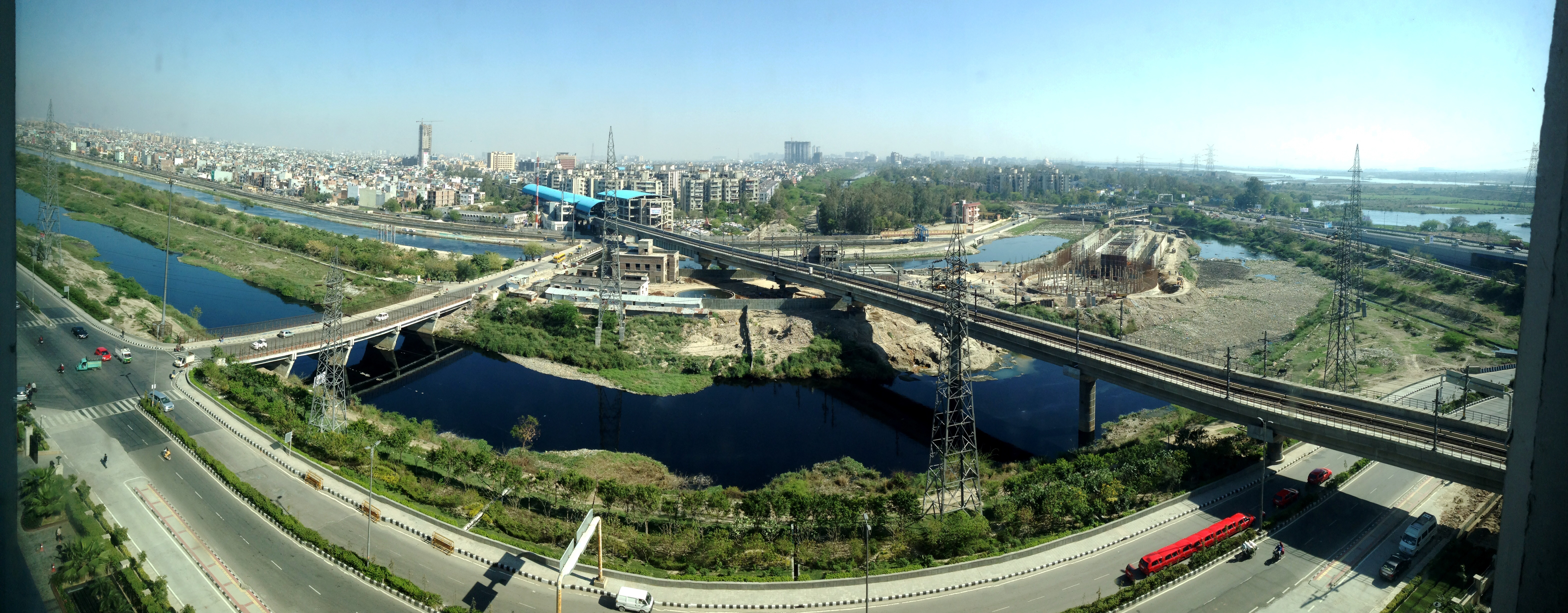
- From Top (left to right): Noida Metro, Noida–Greater Noida Expressway, Noida Skyline, Buddh International Circuit, Yamuna Expressway, Panoramic view of Noida City

- Location of Gautam Buddha Nagar district in Uttar Pradesh
- Country: India
- State: Uttar Pradesh
- Division: Meerut
- Established: 9 June 1997
- Headquarters: Greater Noida
- Tehsils: 1. Sadar (Noida); 2. Dadri; 3. Jewar

Government
  - District Magistrate: Medha Roopam (IAS)
  - Commissioner of Police: Laxmi Singh (IPS)

Area
  - Total: 1,442 km^{2} (557 sq mi)

Population (2011)
  - Total: 1,648,115
  - Density: 1,143/km^{2} (2,960/sq mi)

Demographics
  - Literacy: 98.14%
  - Sex ratio: 851 ♀/ 1000 ♂
- Time zone: UTC+05:30 (IST)
- Vehicle registration: UP-16
- Major highways: NH-24; DND Flyway; Noida–Greater Noida Expressway; Yamuna Expressway; Eastern Peripheral Expressway
- Website: gbnagar.nic.in

Gautam Buddha Nagar district is a district of Uttar Pradesh, named after Gautama Buddha. It is a part of Delhi National Capital Region and is divided into 3 sub-divisions (Tehsils) of Noida, Dadri and Jewar. Greater Noida is the administrative headquarters of Gautam Buddha Nagar district. Noida, Greater Noida, Dadri, Jewar, YEIDA City and Dankaur fall under this district.

== History ==
Gautam Buddha Nagar district was formed on 9 June 1997 under the leadership of Mayawati government by carving out the portions of Ghaziabad district and Bulandshahr district. Dadri and Bisrakh blocks carved out of Ghaziabad, while Dankaur and Jewar blocks have been carved out of Bulandshahr. People from this land were actively associated with the Indian independence movement. Bhagat Singh, Rajguru, Sukhdev and Chandra Shekhar Azad used Nalgadha village (Sector-145, Noida) presently situated on the Noida-Greater Noida Expressway to hide during the freedom struggle. They planned 1929 bomb attack on the Central Legislative Assembly (presently known as Parliament House) from Nalgadha village.

The area occupied by this district has roots in Ramayana, as Bisrakh village in Greater Noida, which is believed to be the birthplace of Ravana's father, Vishrava Rishi lies in this land. In Mahabharata, Dankaur was the Dronacharya's ashram, where Kauravas and Pandavas took their training.

== Demographics ==
Historical population

Year	Pop.	±% p.a.
1901	204,084	—
1911	201,453	−0.13%
1921	194,556	−0.35%
1931	207,635	+0.65%
1941	242,431	+1.56%
1951	281,621	+1.51%

Year	Pop.	±% p.a.
1961	331,688	+1.65%
1971	406,847	+2.06%
1981	514,037	+2.37%
1991	770,367	+4.13%
2001	1,105,292	+3.68%
2011	1,648,115	+4.08%

Religion in Gautam Buddha Nagar district (2011)
Religion	Percent
Hinduism	84.58%
Islam	13.08%
Sikhism	0.56%
Christianity	0.45%
Other or not stated	1.33%
Distribution of religions

According to the 2011 census of India, Gautam Buddha Nagar has a population of 1,648,115. It is ranked 294th out of a total of 640 Indian districts in terms of population. Gautam Buddha Nagar has a population density of 1,161 inhabitants per square kilometre (3,010/sq mi). The female literacy stands at 72.78%, much higher than national average of 65.46%. 59.12% of the population lived in urban areas. Scheduled Castes make up 13.11% of the population.

=== Language ===
Languages of Gautam Buddha Nagar district (2011)
1. Hindi (93.0%)
2. Bengali (1.29%)
3. Urdu (1.10%)
4. Punjabi (0.97%)
5. Bhojpuri (0.93%)
6. Others (2.75%)

At the time of the 2011 census, 92.96% of the population spoke Hindi, 1.29% Bengali, 1.10% Urdu, 0.97% Punjabi and 0.93% Bhojpuri as their first language.

== Administration ==
=== General administration ===
The Gautam Buddha Nagar district is headed by a District Magistrate (DM), usually an IAS officer. The district is divided into 3 sub-divisions, each headed by a Sub-Divisional Magistrate (SDM).

Sr. No	Sub-division	Block(s)	No. of Villages
1.	Sadar (Noida)	Bisrakh and Dankaur	
2.	Dadri	Dadri	
3.	Jewar	Jewar	

=== Police administration ===
On 14 January 2020, the Government of Uttar Pradesh declared Gautam Buddha Nagar district as a Police Commissionerate (along with the Lucknow district). These two Commissionerates were the first to be created in the state of Uttar Pradesh.

The Gautam Buddha Nagar Commissionerate is headed by a police Commissioner, who is an Inspector-General (IG) rank official, assisted by two Additional Commissioners — one each for law and order, and crime and headquarters — who are of Deputy Inspector General rank. Its current Commissioner is Laxmi Singh, a 2000-batch IPS officer. These top three officials are reported to by seven deputy commissioners of the SP rank, nine additional deputy commissioner of police and 17 assistant commissioners of police of the deputy SP rank.

The district is divided into three zones – Noida, Central Noida and Greater Noida - consisting of 29 police stations. Zone One is Noida, comprising 10 stations of Sector 20, Sector 24, Sector 39, Sector 58, Sector 49, Expressway and Women's police station. Zone Two, Central Noida, comprising parts of Noida, Greater Noida, and Greater Noida West, has nine stations – Phase 2, Phase 3, Bisrakh, Ecotech 3, Surajpur and Badalpur. Zone Three, Greater Noida, has nine police stations — Sector Beta 2, Knowledge Park, Site V, Dadri, Jarcha, Dankaur, Rabupura, Ecotech 1 and Jewar.

As of 14 January 2020, Gautam Buddha Nagar had 3,869 police personnel — 42 inspectors, 459 sub-inspectors, 972 head constables and 2,396 constables.

== Villages ==
- Chipyana Buzurg
- Mahvalipur

== Places of interest ==
- Buddh International Circuit
- The Great India Place
- Worlds of Wonder
- DLF Mall of India
- Gautam Buddha University
- Rashtriya Dalit Prerna Sthal and Green Garden
- Okhla Sanctuary
