= Omega I, Greater Noida =

Omega I ओमेगा 1
- Neighborhood
- Location within Uttar Pradesh
- Coordinates: 28°27′15″N 77°30′45″E
- Country: India
- Region: North India
- State: Uttar Pradesh
- City: Greater Noida

Government
  - Body: Greater Noida Industrial Development Authority

Languages
  - Official: Hindi, English
- Time zone: UTC+5:30 (IST)
- PIN: 201310

Omega I or Omega 1 (Hindi: ओमेगा 1) is a sector in south-western Greater Noida, Uttar Pradesh, India, mostly known for serving the Greenwoods and Divine Grace gated society. Bordered by Omega II to the north and Phi I, Phi II and Chi III to the south, it also serves the head office of Yamuna Expressway Industrial Development Authority (YEIDA). It is named after the Greek letter Omega.
