= Omega II, Greater Noida =

Omega II ओमेगा 2 NRI City
- Neighborhood
- Location within Uttar Pradesh
- Coordinates: 28°27′48″N 77°30′43″E
- Country: India
- Region: North India
- State: Uttar Pradesh
- City: Greater Noida

Government
  - Body: Greater Noida Industrial Development Authority

Languages
  - Official: Hindi, English
- Time zone: UTC+5:30 (IST)
- PIN: 201310

Omega II or Omega 2 (Hindi: ओमेगा 2), is a sector in south-western Greater Noida, Uttar Pradesh, India, primarily known for serving the NRI City. Bordered by Omega I to the south, PSI-I to the west and Knowledge Park I to the north, it shares close proximity with the Yamuna Expressway. It is named after the Greek letter Omega.
