= Greater Noida =

City in Uttar Pradesh, India

- City
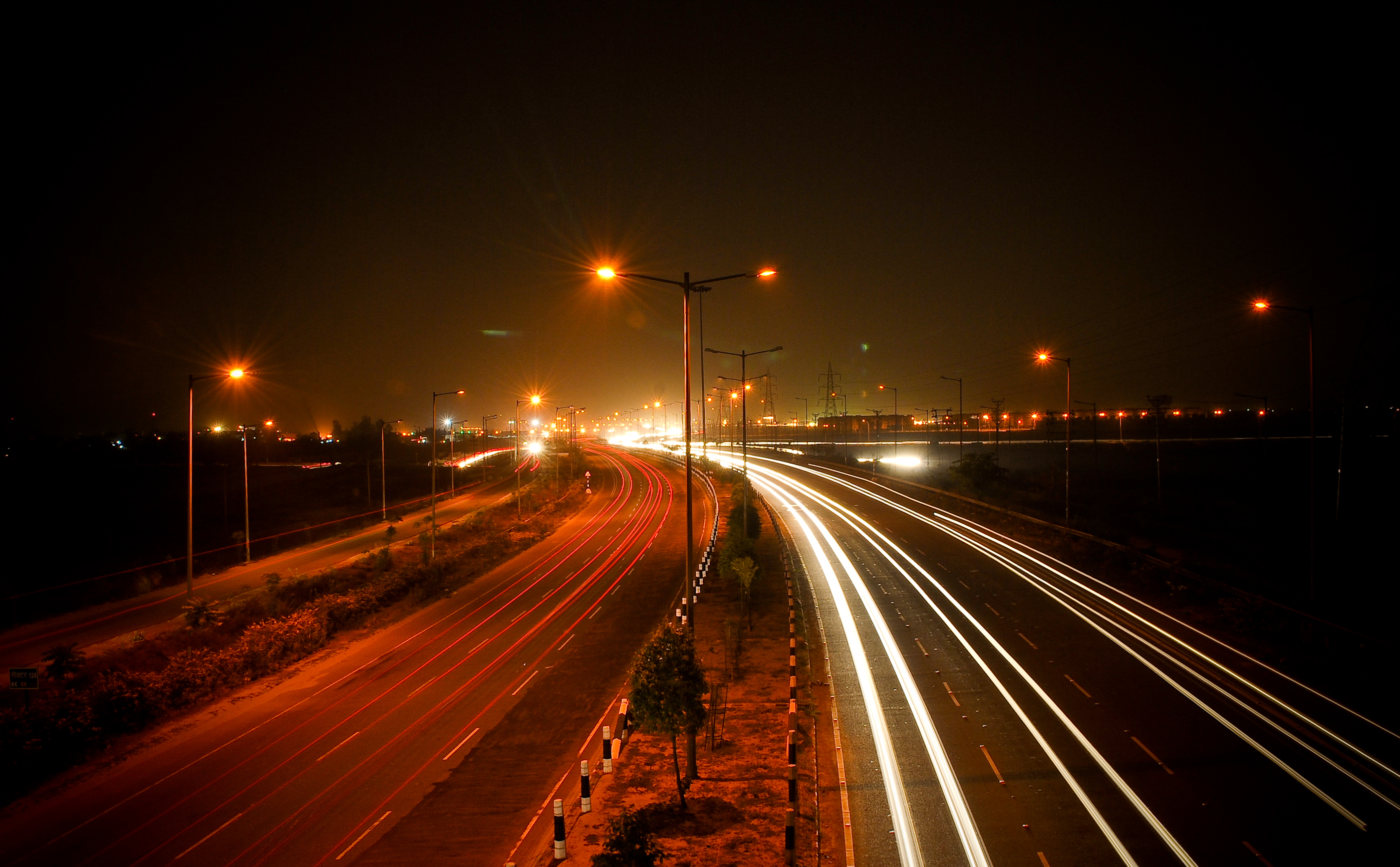
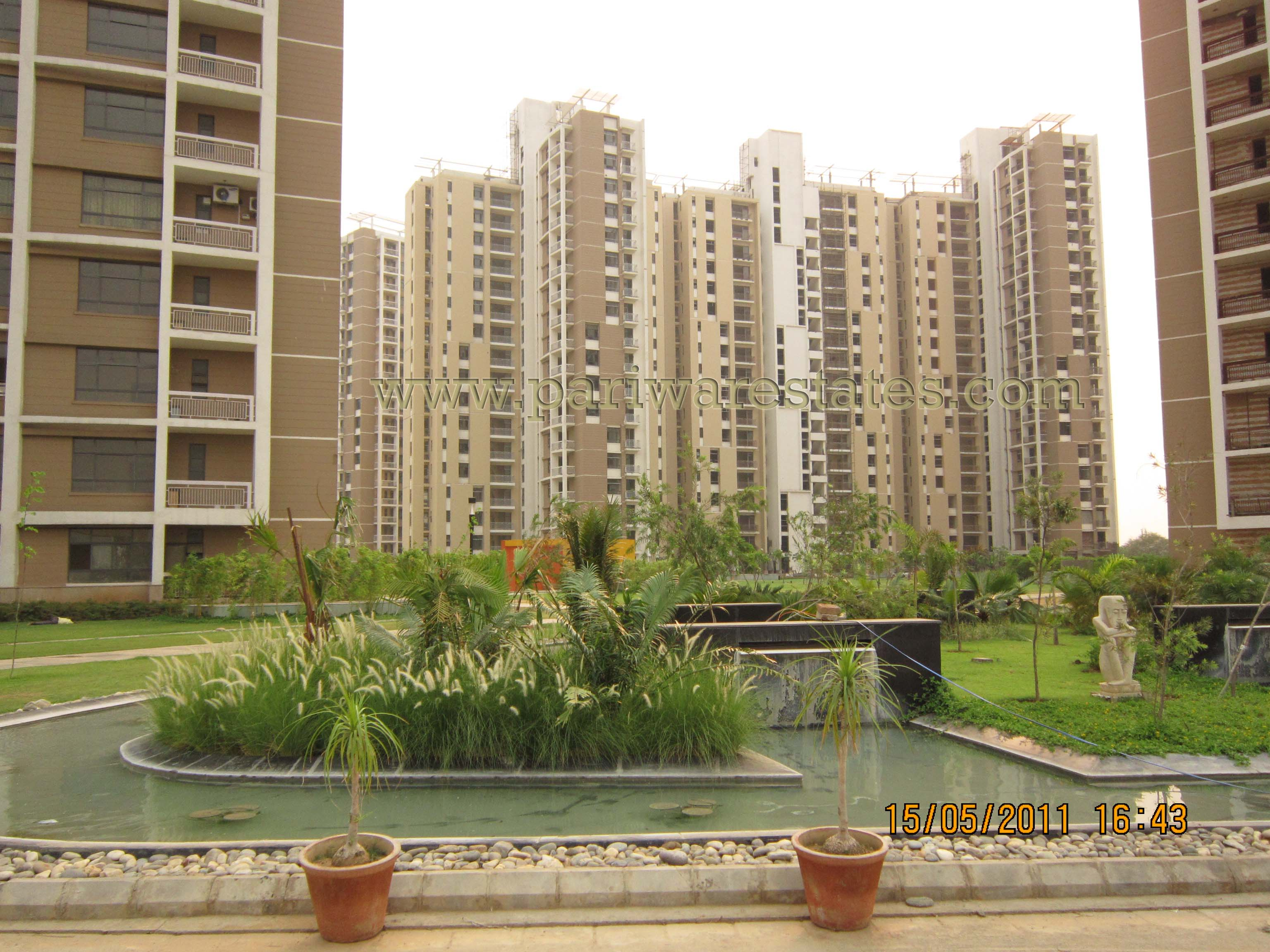
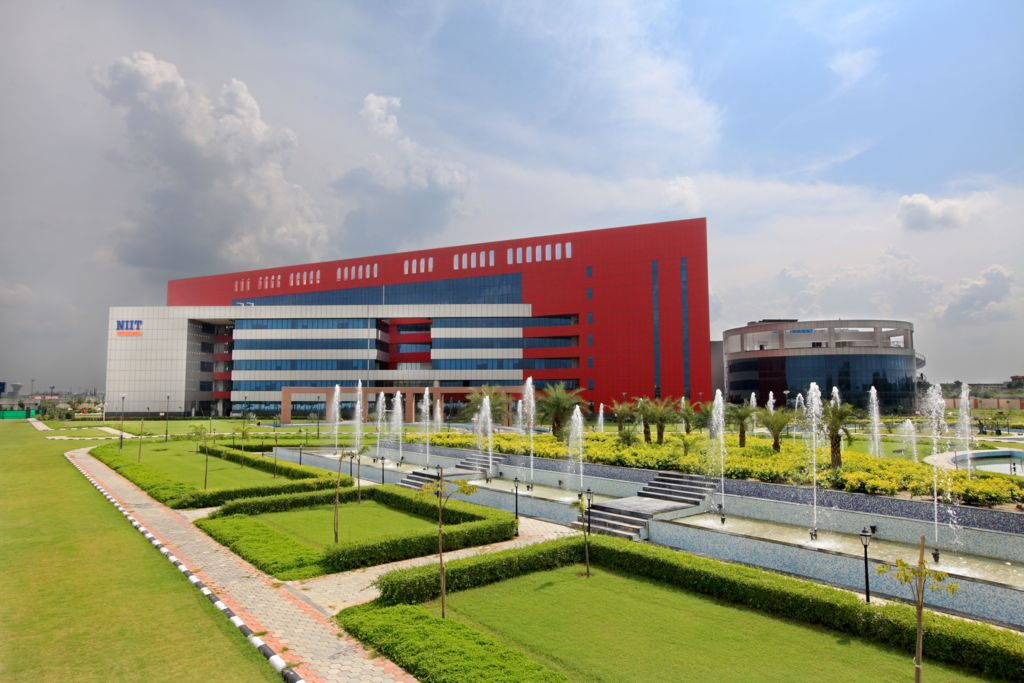
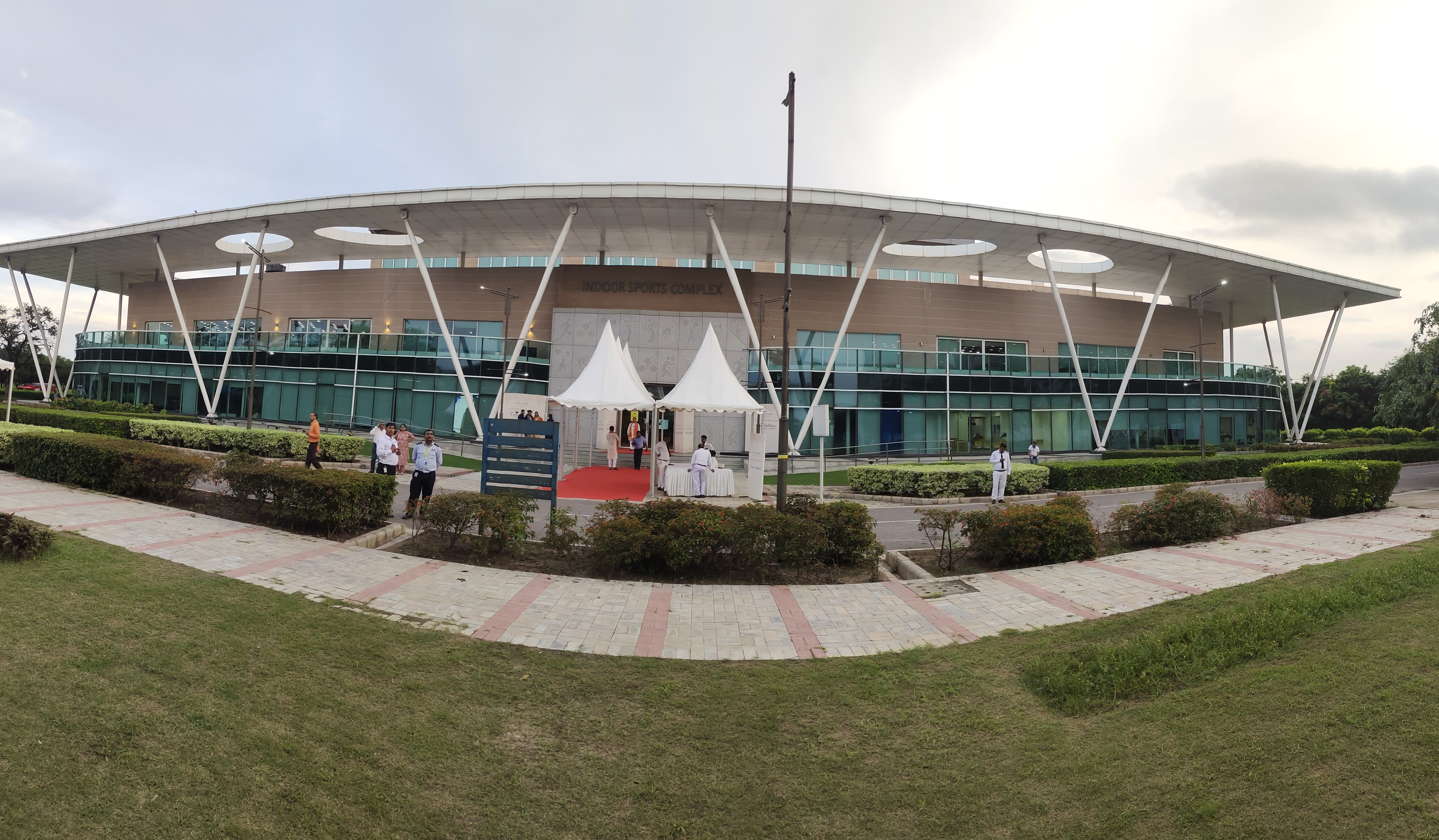
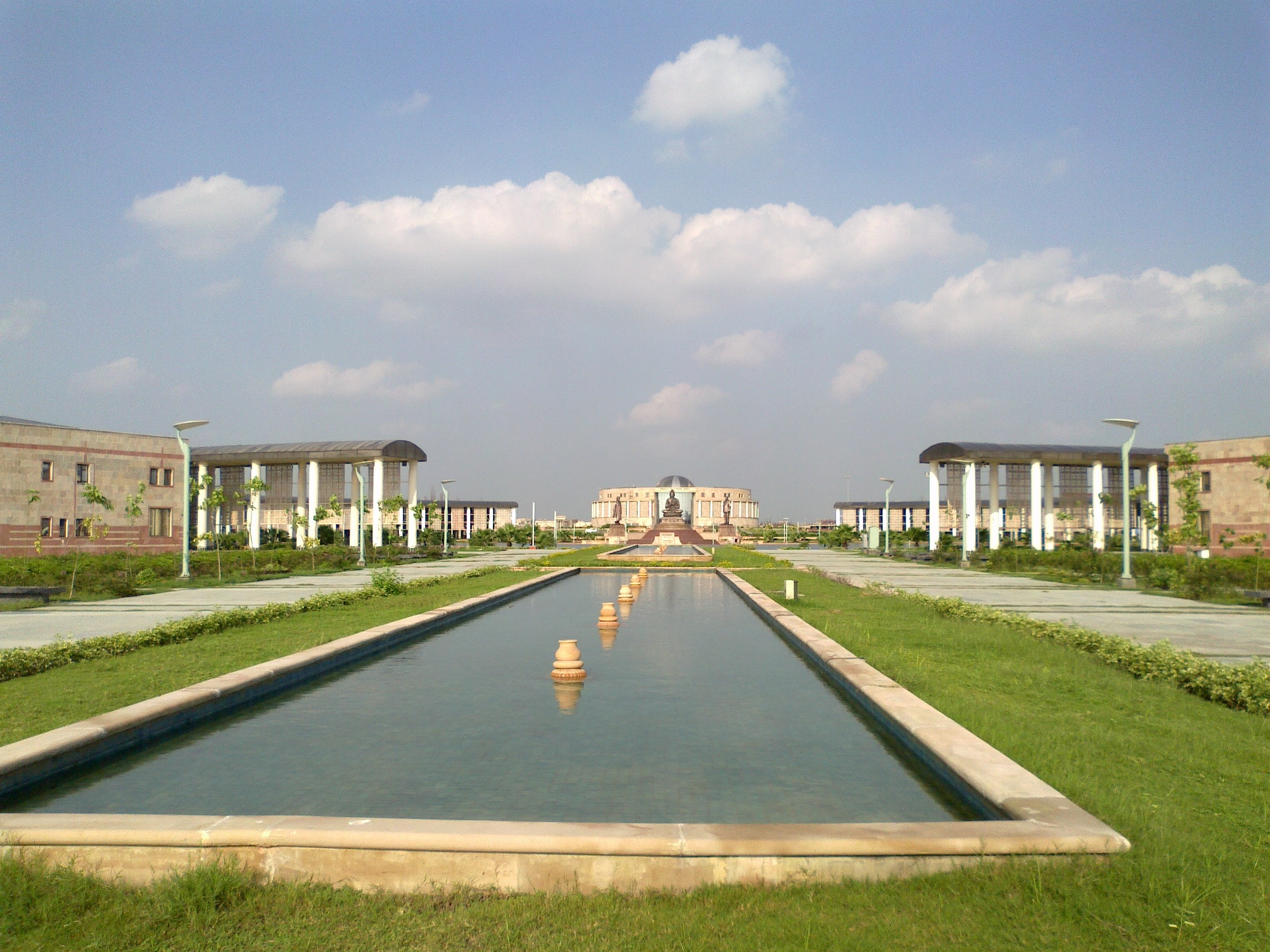
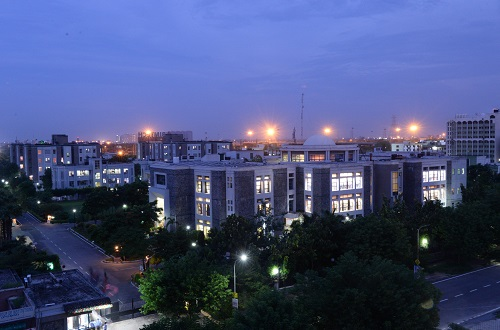
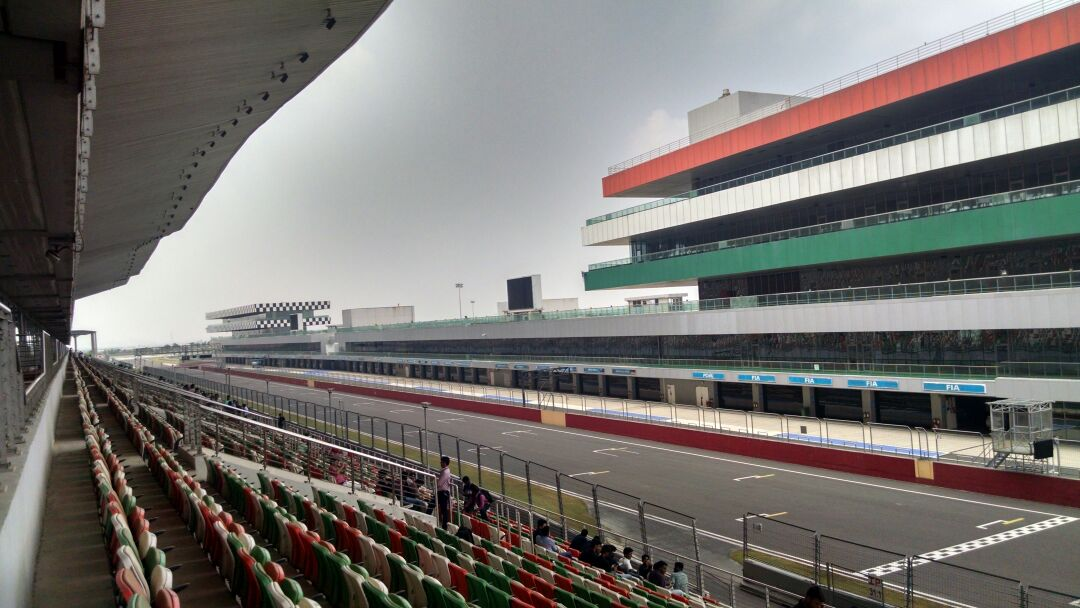
- Noida–Greater Noida Expressway Unitech Horizon Coforge headquarters Shiv Nadar University Gautam Buddha University BIMTECH Night skyline of GrenoWest Sector 1 Buddh International Circuit
- Nicknames: GreNo
- Motto: Planned with an obsession
- Location in Uttar Pradesh Location in India
- Coordinates: 28.47°N 77.51°E
- Country: India
- State: Uttar Pradesh
- Division: Meerut
- District: Gautam Buddha Nagar
- Established: January 28, 1991; 35 years ago

Government
  - Type: Government of Uttar Pradesh
  - Body: Greater Noida Authority
  - Chairman, Greater Noida Authority: Manoj Kumar Singh, IAS
  - CEO, Greater Noida Authority: Ravi Kumar N G, IAS
  - Commissioner, Meerut Division: Selva Kumari J, IAS
  - District Magistrate and Collector: Medha Roopam, IAS

Area
  - Total: 380 km^{2} (150 sq mi)

Population (2011)
  - Total: 107,676
  - Density: 280/km^{2} (730/sq mi)

Language
  - Official: Hindi
  - Additional official: Urdu
  - Other: English
- Time zone: UTC+5:30 (IST)
- PIN: 201310
- Telephone code: 0120
- Vehicle registration: UP-16, DL16
- Nearest city: Noida
- Literacy: 87%
- Lok Sabha Constituency: Gautam Buddha Nagar
- Expressways: Noida-Greater Noida Expressway, Yamuna Expressway and Eastern Peripheral Expressway
- Sports: Buddh International Circuit, Jaypee Sports City, Jaypee Sports Complex and Greater Noida Cricket Stadium
- Golf Course: Jaypee Greens Godrej Golf Links Golf Course
- Website: Greater Noida Authority

Greater Noida is a planned city located in the Gautam Buddha Nagar district of the Indian state of Uttar Pradesh. The city was created as an extension of the area under the UP Industrial Area Development Act, of 1976. Situated 40.2 km (25.0 mi) southeast of the Center of the capital city New Delhi, it takes around 30 minutes to travel between the cities via the Noida-Greater Noida Expressway. The city is administered by the Greater Noida Industrial Development Authority (GNIDA). Greater Noida is being developed as Metro Centre providing for quality urban environment, to attract economic activities and population to decongest Delhi. It provides for planning, Developing, Regulating and Operations under a Single Authority-GNIDA.

Noida was one of several planned cities developed in the 1980s to address rapid population growth in metropolitan areas such as Delhi, Mumbai, and Kolkata. However, population growth in Noida surpassed early projections, prompting the Government of Uttar Pradesh to plan an extension of the city — later developed as Greater Noida.

== Etymology ==
Initially, developers coined the term "Noida Extension" to distinguish it from the adjacent Noida. The Greater Noida Authority later declared that the area would be referred to as 'Greater Noida West'.

== History ==
In the early 1980s, the Government of India realised that the rapid rate at which Delhi was expanding would result in chaos. Hence, they planned to develop residential and industrial areas around the capital to reduce the demographic burden. Before Greater Noida City, two areas had been developed—Gurgaon, across the border from Haryana, and Noida, across the border with Uttar Pradesh.

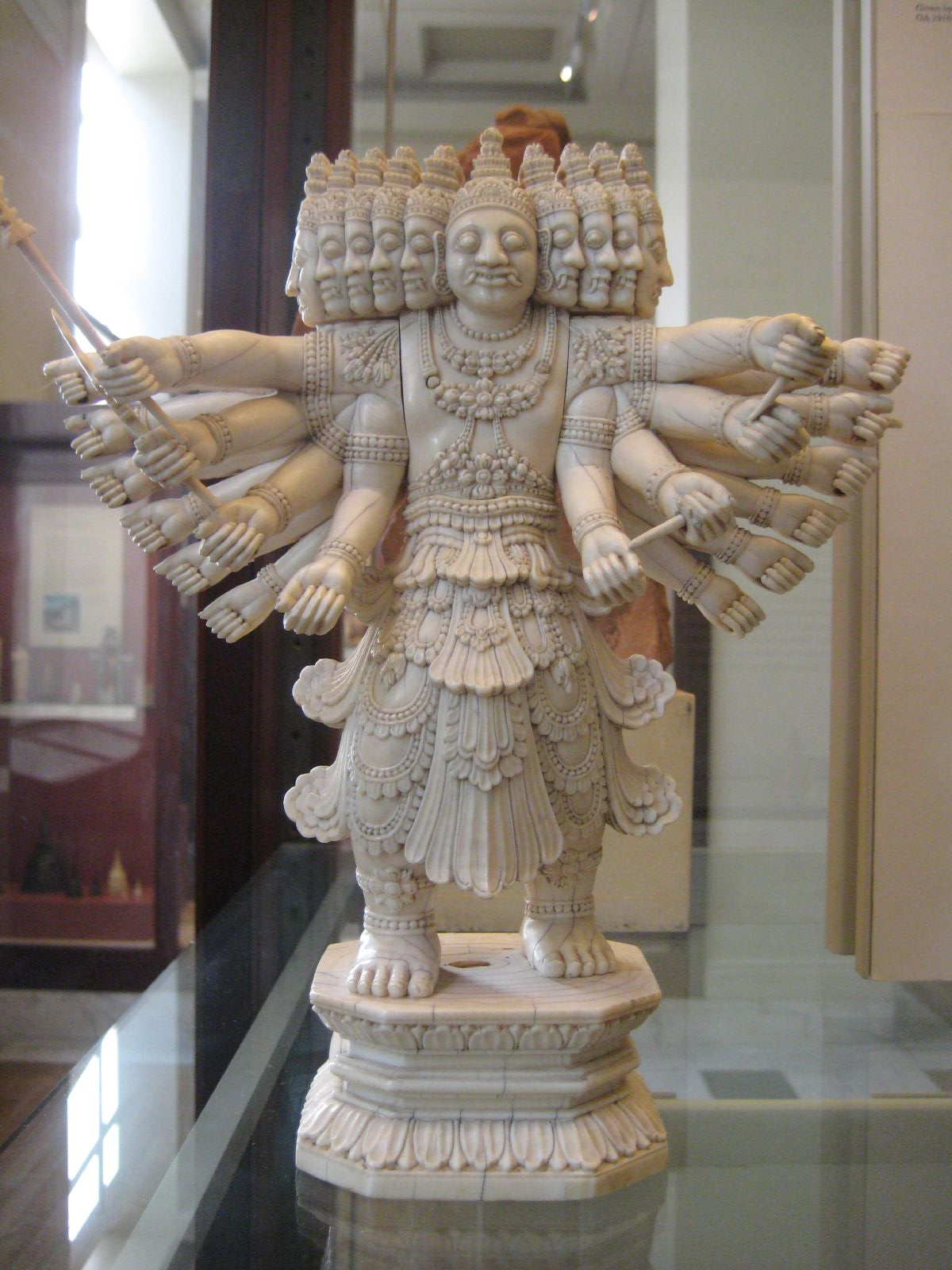
Bisrakh, Uttar Pradesh; the birthplace of Demon king Ravana

Greater Noida Notified Area – 38000 Ha (380 km^{2}) comprised 124 villages. Noida's infrastructure was carefully laid out, but the 1990s saw huge growth in the Indian economy. Migration to cities like Delhi, Mumbai, Kolkata, Chennai, Hyderabad and Bangalore exceeded planning estimates.

Noida was developed to accommodate population growth for 20–25 years. The massive population influx from Delhi, however, caused it to overload in a mere 15 years, although intake is not complete and illegal mining remains a problem.

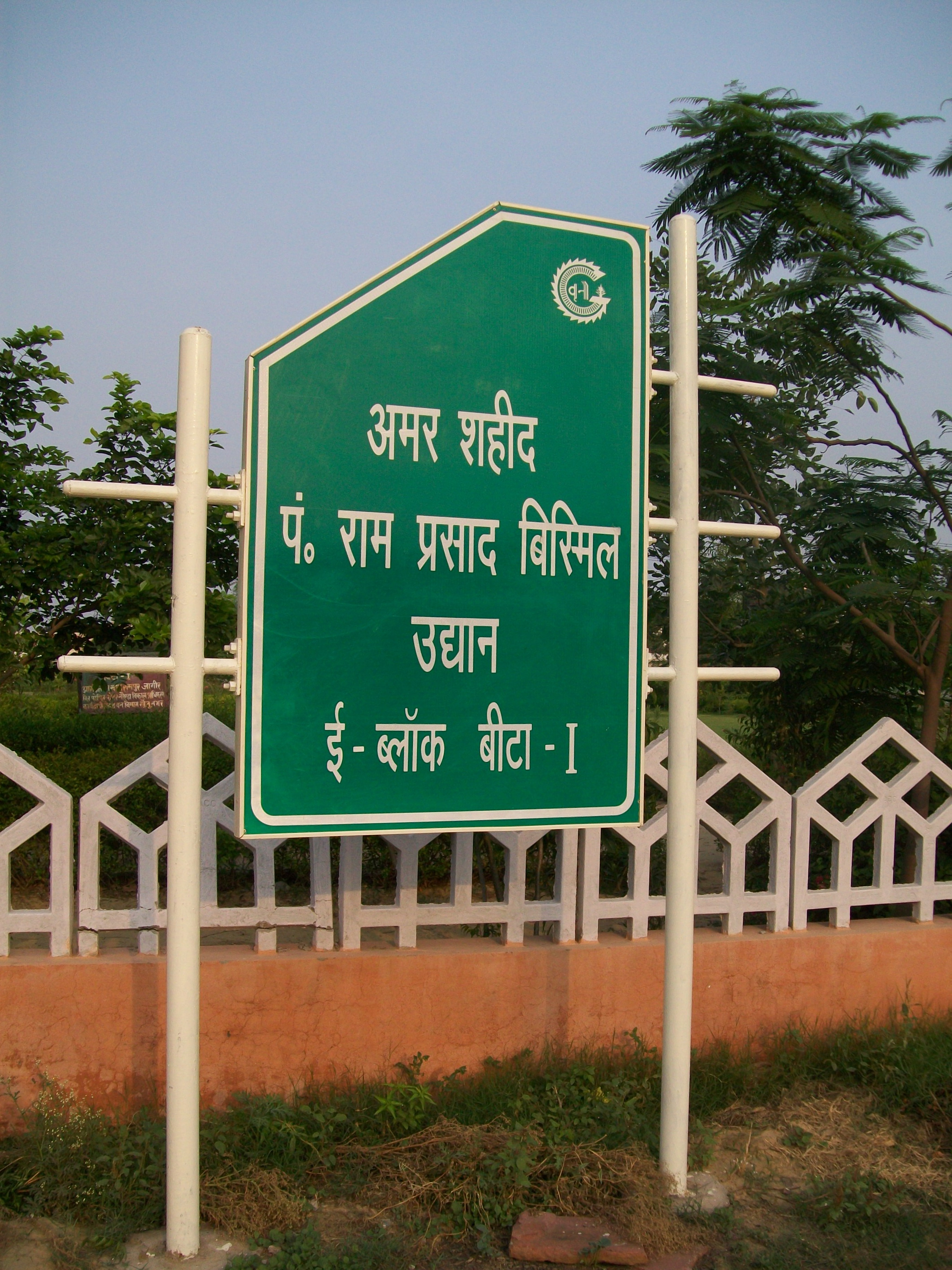
Shaheed Bismil Park, Sector-Beta 1 in Greater Noida City

The government of Uttar Pradesh decided to develop another city as an extension to Noida with better planning. The idea was to create a world-class town approximately 25 kilometres from Noida. A railway station near Boraki and an international airport were included later in the plan intending to develop Greater Noida as an independent city.

During the 1990s, the Noida extension (now a part of Gautam Buddh Nagar) became what is today known as Greater Noida. The Greater NOIDA Authority manages the development of the city. Greater Noida is connected to Agra by the six-lane Yamuna Expressway. The Buddh International Circuit was used to hold the Indian Grand Prix in 2011, 2012 and 2013 before the premature cancellation of the contract. The Indian MotoGP was held here in 2023.

Roads are wide with service lanes for every major road. The sectors are named by letters of the Greek alphabet. All cabling and utilities have been built underground. Alpha, Beta, and Gamma are the oldest sectors. The other emerging sectors include Xi, Delta, Mu, Omicron and Tau.

The present GNIDA office is in Gamma II sector just opposite the historical village Rampur Jagir/Jahangir where the revolutionary Pandit Ram Prasad Bismil lived in 1919 when he was hidden underground after the Mainpuri conspiracy. A park has been named "Amar Shaheed Pt. Ram Prasad Bismil Udyan" by the Uttar Pradesh Government.

The 12th, 13th, 14th and 15th Auto Expos (The Motor Show) were held at India Expo Mart, Greater Noida, in February 2014, 2016 and 2018, 2020 respectively.

== Geography ==
=== Greater Noida West ===
Greater Noida West, previously known as Noida extension is a part of Greater Noida and it is a sub city within GB Nagar district of UP near to National Capital Territory of Delhi and part of National Capital Region (NCR) Metropolitan area. Greater Noida West Spread over nearly 3,635 hectares is around 4–5 km from Sector 121 Noida are a part of the Greater Noida Authority (GNIDA).

The road from Sector 121 that crosses Hindon river reaches Sectors 1,2,3,4, 16B, 16C,10, 12, Techzone, Knowledge Park 5, etc in Greater Noida West and consists of 16 villages: Khairpur Gurjar, Shahberi, Devla, Patwari, Ghanghola, Bisrakh, Roza-Yakubpur, Haibatpur, Itaida, Patwari, Aminabad, Asadallapur, Maincha and Chipyana Buzurg.

Also, Greater Noida West (Noida extension) did not have any PIN Codes assigned by Postal Department yet, as of November 2018.

=== Climate ===
Greater Noida has a similar climate to Delhi: very hot and dry during summer, hot and humid during monsoons, pleasant and dry during spring and autumn, and cool to cold during winters.

According to the Bureau of Indian Standards, the town falls under seismic zone-III, on a scale of I to V (in order of increasing proneness to earthquakes). At the same time, the wind and cyclone zoning is a "very high damage risk", according to the UNDP report. Greater Noida has a Tropical Savanna Climate with three main seasons: summer, monsoon and winter. Aside from monsoon weather, it mainly remains dry.

In summer, i.e. from March to June, the temperature ranges from a maximum of 45 °C (i.e. 113 °F) to a minimum of 23 °C (73 °F). Monsoon season prevails during mid-June to mid-September with an average rainfall of 93.2 cm (36.7 inches). The cold waves from the Himalayan region make the winters in Greater Noida very chilly. Temperatures fall to as low as 3 to 4 °C at the peak of winter. In January, a dense fog envelopes the city, reducing visibility on the streets.

According to the World Air Quality Report 2024, Greater Noida is one of the world's 20 most polluted city in India.

== Demographics ==
According to voter data published by the Election Commission of India has constituency-level estimates for the GB Nagar Lok Sabha seat in Gautam Buddha Nagar district, community-wise population figures are often discussed during elections. Reports suggest that the Rajput community is estimated at around 4.5–5 lakh individuals thus making them single-largest voter group in Gautam Buddha Nagar (Greater Noida). Other estimates indicate approximately 3–3.5 lakh Gujjars, around 2.5–3 lakh Brahmins, and nearly 4 lakh voters belonging to Scheduled Castes and Communities. The Muslim population in the constituency is believed to be close to 3.5 lakh, making them a significant part of the electoral landscape.

As per the provisional data of the 2011 census, Greater Noida had a population of 107,676, with 58,662 males and 49,014 females. The literacy rate was 86.54%, 91.48% of males and 80.65% of females.

== Government and politics ==
=== Authority ===
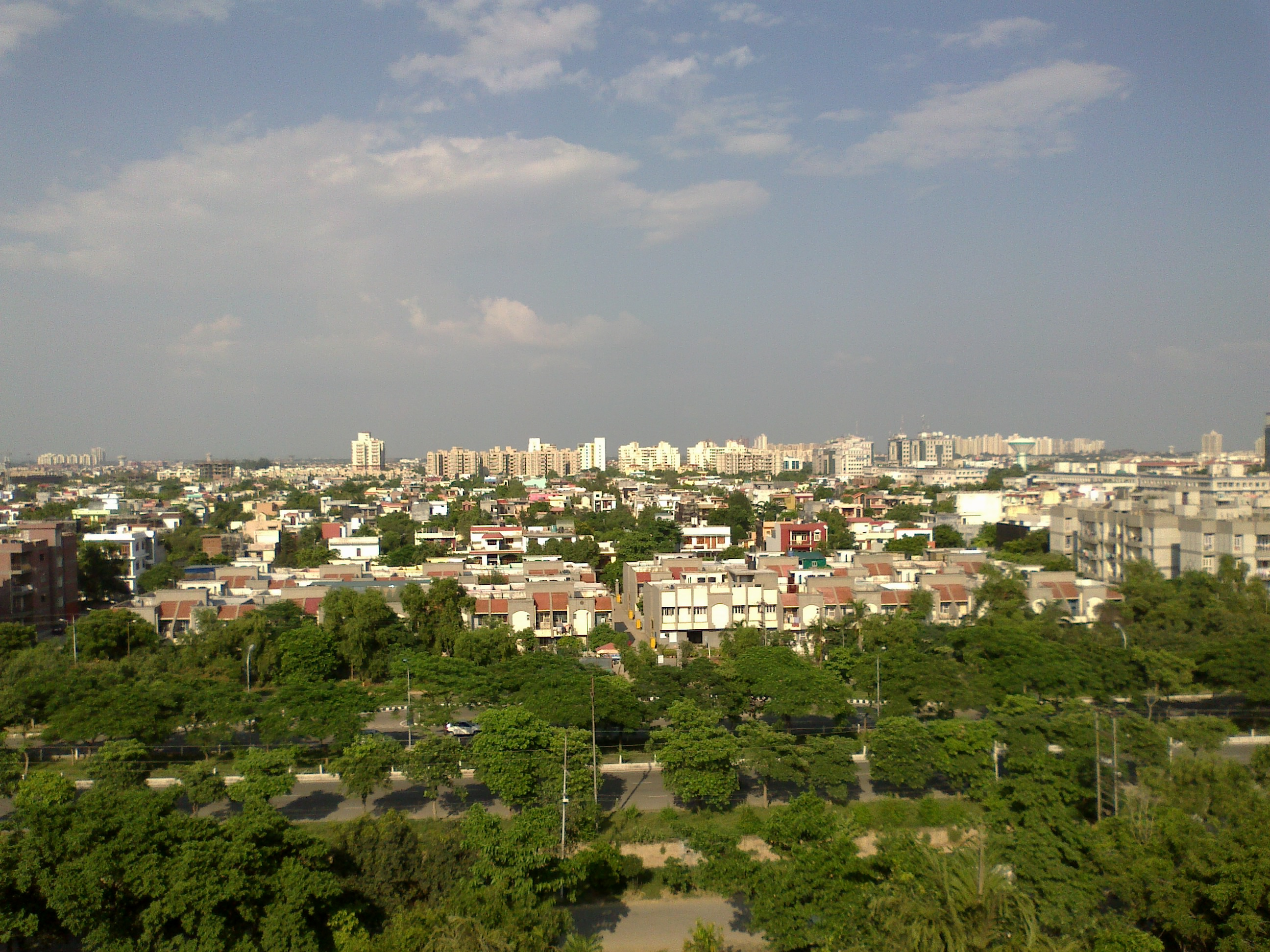
Panoramic view of Greater Noida

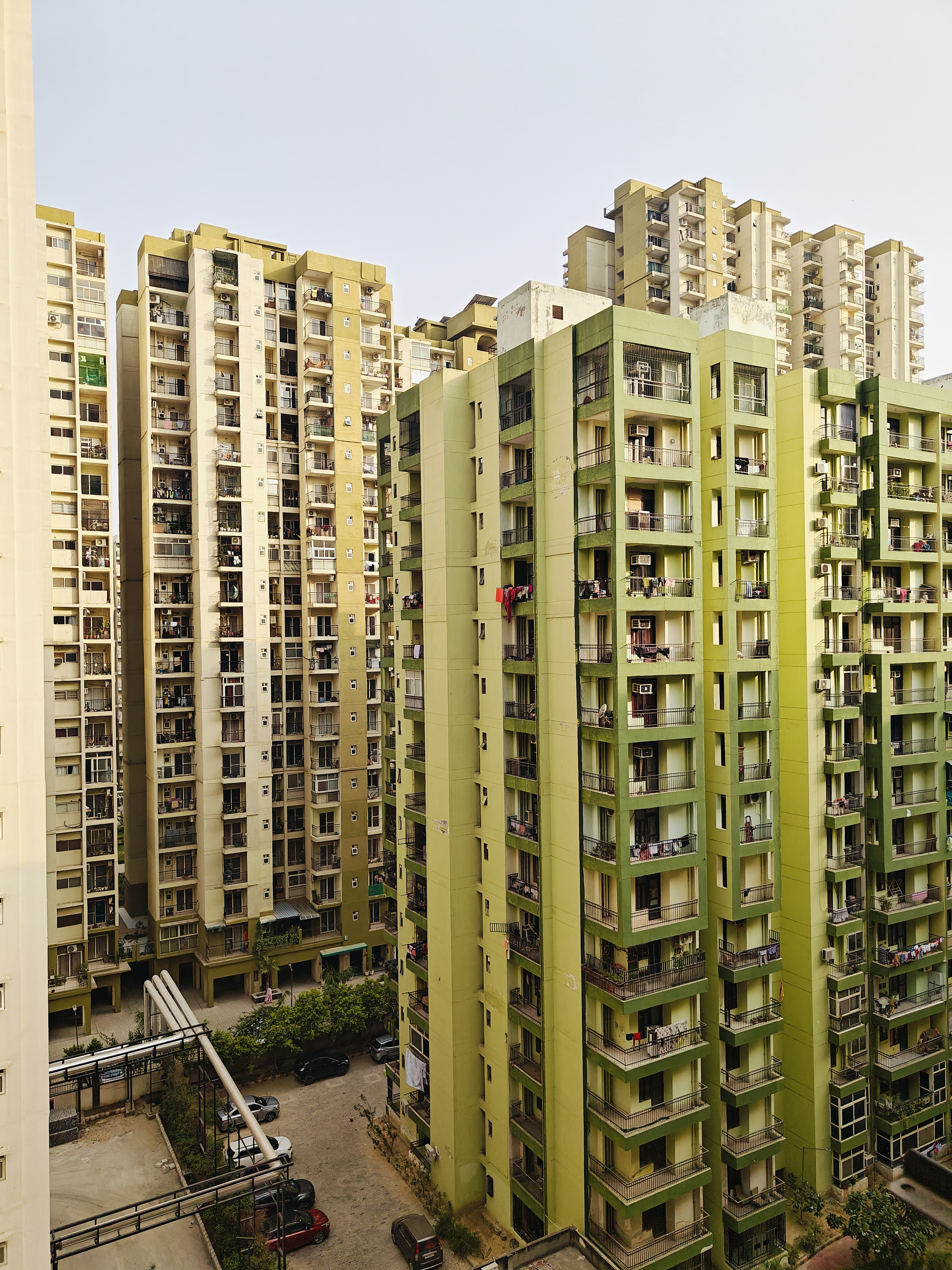
High-rise apartment complex in Greater Noida

The city's infrastructure is looked after by the Greater Noida Industrial Development Authority, a statutory authority set-up under Uttar Pradesh Industrial Area Development Act, 1976. Authority's head is its chairman, who is an IAS officer, the authority's daily matters however, are looked after by its CEO, who is also an IAS officer. Greater NOIDA Authority comes under the Infrastructure and Industrial Development Department of Uttar Pradesh Government. As of 30 September 2026, the Chairman is Manoj Kumar Singh, whereas the CEO is Ravi Kumar NG.

=== District administration ===
The Gautam Buddha Nagar district is a part of Meerut division, headed by the Divisional Commissioner, who is an IAS officer of high seniority, the Commissioner is the head of local government institutions (including Municipal Corporations) in the division, is in-charge of infrastructure development in his division, and is also responsible for maintaining law and order in the division. The District Magistrate, hence, reports to the Divisional Commissioner of Meerut. The current Commissioner is Anita Meshram.

Gautam Budh Nagar district administration is headed by the District Magistrate of Gautam Budh Nagar, who is an IAS officer. The DM is in charge of property records and revenue collection for the central government and oversee the national elections held in the city. The DM was also responsible for maintaining law and order in the city prior to Police Commissionerate, hence now police commissioner is only responsible for law and order of Gautam Budh Nagar.

The District Magistrate is assisted by one Chief Development Officer, three Additional District Magistrates (Executive, Finance/Revenue and Land Acquisition) and one City Magistrate. The district has divided into three Tehsils named Sadar, Dadri and Jewar each headed by a Sub-Divisional Magistrate who reports to the District Magistrate. As of 30 September 2026, the current DM is Medha Roopam (IAS).

=== Noida Police Commissionerate ===
Noida Police Commissionerate or Gautam Buddha Nagar Police Commissionerate On 14 January 2020, the Government of Uttar Pradesh declared Gautam Buddha Nagar district as a Police Commissionerate (along with the Lucknow district). These two Commissionerate were the first to be created in the state of Uttar Pradesh. The Gautam Buddha Nagar Police Commissionerate is headed by an Commissioner of Police, who is an Additional Director General (ADG) rank official, assisted by two Additional Commissioners of Police (Addl CP) — one each for law and order, and crime and headquarters — who are of Deputy Inspector General (DIG) rank.

As of 30 September 2026, Its current Police Commissioner is Laxmi Singh, a 2000-batch IPS officer (RR).These top three officials are reported by seven Deputy Commissioners (DCP) of the SP rank, nine additional deputy commissioner of police (Addl DCP) and 17 assistant commissioners of police (ACP) of the deputy SP rank.

The district is divided into three police zones – Noida, Central Noida and Greater Noida - consisting of 29 police stations. Zone One is Noida, comprising 10 stations of Sector 20, Sector 24, Sector 39, Sector 58, Sector 49, Expressway and Women's police station. Zone Two, Central Noida, comprising parts of Noida, Greater Noida, and Greater Noida West, has nine stations – Phase 2, Phase 3, Bisrakh, Ecotech 3, Surajpur and Badalpur. Zone Three, Greater Noida, has nine police stations — Sector Beta 2, Knowledge Park, Site V, Dadri, Jarcha, Dankaur, Rabupura, Ecotech 1 and Jewar.

As of 14 January 2020, Gautam Buddha Nagar had 3,869 police personnel — 42 inspectors, 459 sub-inspectors, 972 head constables and 2,396 constables.

=== Hospitals ===
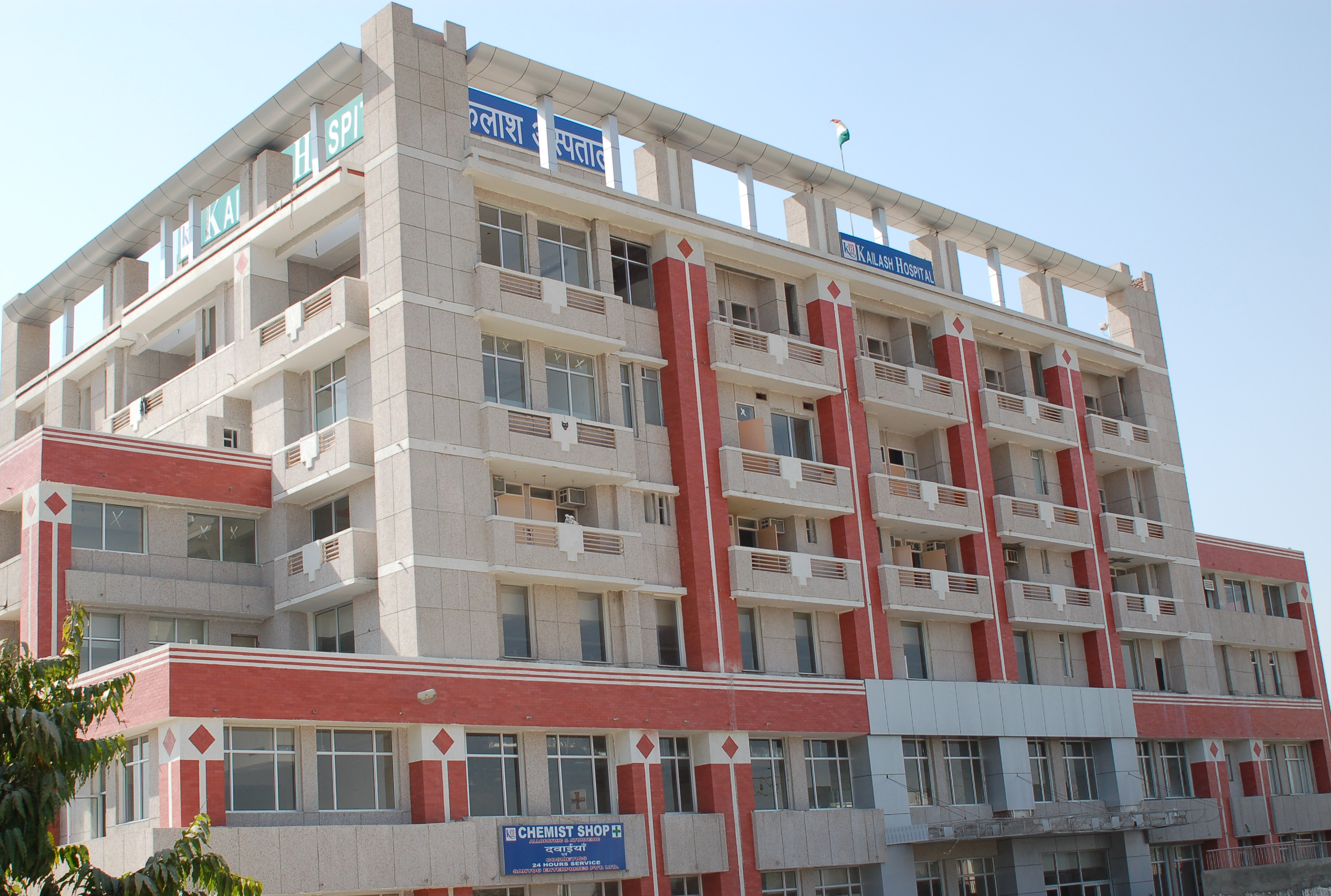
Kailash Hospital Greater Noida

Hospitals in Greater Noida include:

- Yatharth Super Speciality Hospital, Greater Noida(part of Yatharth Hospitals)
- Yatharth Super Speciality Hospital, Noida Extension (Greater Noida West)
- Fortis Hospital, Greater Noida
- Kailash Hospital Greater Noida
- Promhex Multispeciality Hospital
- Numed Hospital
- Sarvodaya Hospital, Greater Noida

== Economy ==
=== Industries ===
Of late, Greater Noida has attracted a lot of interest from major corporate houses for setting up their businesses in the city. In November 2016, Patanjali Ayurved announced that it would be investing Rs. 20 billion in a greenfield investment in Greater Noida. The project has been approved by Uttar Pradesh Cabinet. A clutch of mobile manufacturers have also shown interest in investing in Greater Noida. Taiwan Electrical and Electronics Manufacturers' Association will develop a 210-acre greenfield electronic manufacturing cluster in Greater Noida with an investment of US$200 million.

== Transport ==
=== Metro connectivity ===
The Noida Metro Rail Corporation (NMRC) launched metro connectivity in Greater Noida on 25 January 2019. This project was announced in 2013. The metro runs primarily across the Noida-Greater Noida Expressway.

In July 2026, the proposed 8.4 km extension of the Aqua Line from Noida Sector 51 to Greater Noida West Sector 4 received clearance from the Public Investment Board (PIB), one of the final approvals before consideration by the Union Cabinet. The corridor is planned to have five stations and is estimated to cost approximately ₹2,000 crore.

Proposed metro routes are the following –

- Noida Sector 51 to Greater Noida West Sector 4 (Aqua Line extension).
- Noida Sector 51 to Boraki Railway Station.
- Knowledge Park-II to Noida International Airport in Jewar.

It will also provide connectivity to the upcoming YIEDA city.

== Road network ==
The construction of the "Link Road" joining Greater Noida West with Noida Phase III is expected to be ready by April 2022.

=== Infrastructure ===
In September 2025, the Greater Noida Industrial Development Authority (GNIDA) approved the construction of a new three-lane reinforced concrete (RCC) bridge over the Hawalia drain near the Sector P-3 roundabout. The ₹7-crore project will replace an old, narrow bridge that has been prone to congestion and safety risks. The new bridge, to be built by the irrigation department, will be 25 metres long, 10.5 metres wide, and at least three metres higher than the existing structure to match the adjoining carriageway. It is expected to ease travel for commuters between Knowledge Park, the Noida Expressway, Pari Chowk, Swarn Nagari, and the Yamuna Expressway. The work is targeted for completion within a year.

== Education ==
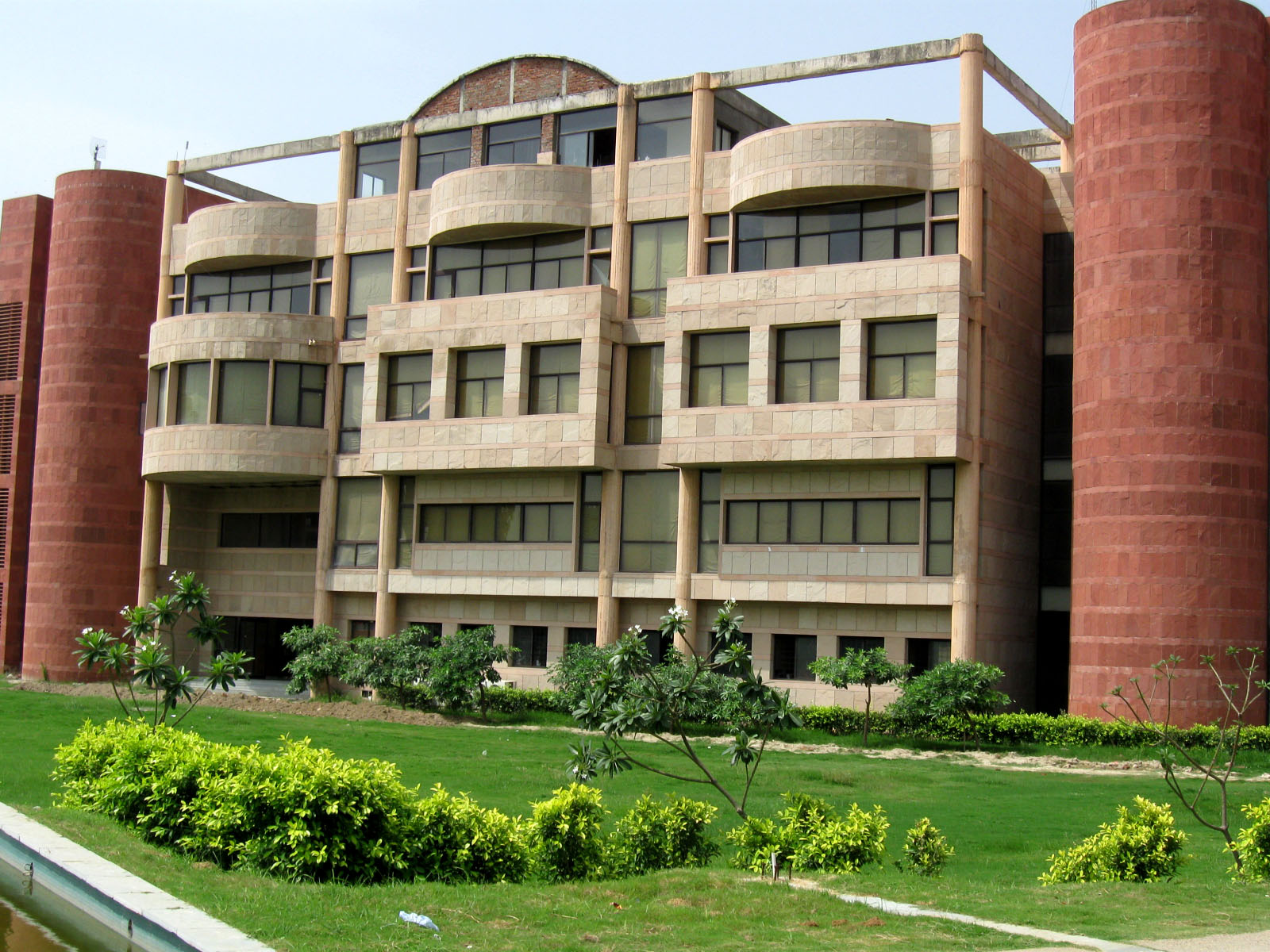
Galgotias College of Engineering and Technology, Greater Noida

=== Schools ===
- Fr. Agnel School
- Delhi Public School, Greater Noida
- Greater Valley School, Greater Noida
- Ryan International School

=== Universities ===
- Amity University Greater Noida campus
- Bennett University
- Galgotias University
- Gautam Buddha University
- Sharda University
- Shiv Nadar University

=== Colleges and institutes ===
- Accurate Institute of Management and Technology
- Army Institute of Management and Technology, Greater Noida
- Galgotias College of Engineering and Technology
- Gautam Buddha University
- Lloyd Law College
- Pandit Deendayal Upadhyaya Institute of Archaeology

== Sports ==
Located on Yamuna Expressway, Jaypee Sports City is a planned city aimed for sports, complete with various sports venues like an international standard cricket stadium, a hockey stadium, and an international Formula 1 racing circuit.

On 30 October 2011, Greater Noida hosted the inaugural Formula One Indian Grand Prix at the Buddh International Circuit constructed by Jaypee Group. It was the seventeenth round of the 2011 Formula One season, and the first Formula One Grand Prix to take place on the Indian subcontinent and even the circuit is the first of its kind in South Asia. The second and third Formula One Indian Grands Prix were held in October 2012 and 2013, and Red Bull won.

Greater Noida Cricket Stadium, also known as "Shaheed Vijay Singh Pathik Stadium," is located near Jaypee Green Golf Course. The stadium hosted its first Ranji Trophy match between Uttar Pradesh and Baroda from 1–4 December 2015. The ground would now be used by the national cricket team of Afghanistan as its home ground.

National badminton coach Pullela Gopichand has opened a badminton academy in Greater Noida Stadium.

Jaypee Greens Golf Course, an 18-hole, par-72 course designed by Greg Norman, is situated in Greater Noida. The course opened in June 2000 and received a "Tourism Friendly Golf Course" award from India's Ministry of Tourism in 2011. It is the longest course in India.

There will also be a hockey stadium which is under construction and has a sports training academy and infrastructure for other sports.

The Time Trial cycling event for the 2010 Commonwealth Games was held at Noida–Greater Noida Expressway. Greater Noida Sports Complex Ground is also the Home Ground of Afghanistan Cricket Team.

== Notable people ==
- Arjun Bhati, Indian teenage golfer
- Varun Singh Bhati, para high jumper
