= List of Noida Metro stations =

Map of Noida Metro

This is a list of all stations of the Noida Metro, a rapid transit system serving Noida and Greater Noida in Uttar Pradesh. It was opened on 25 January 2019. There are a total of 21 metro stations.

Noida Metro is the 11th metro system in India. The first section of the Delhi Metro opened on 25 January 2019 with the Aqua Line, and it has since been expanded to around 28 kilometers of route length as of 25 January 2019. The network has only one operational line, and is built and operated by the Noida Metro Rail Corporation (NMRC).

Noida Sector 51 metro station offers an interchange with Delhi Metro.

For one year it will be operated by Delhi Metro Rail Corporation (DMRC); after that, it will be operated by Noida Metro Rail Corporation Limited (NMRC).

== Metro stations ==
†	Terminal station
*	Transfer station
†*	Terminal and transfer station to other lines

Station name		Line	Opened	Layout	Notes	Refs
English	Hindi	Line	Opened	Layout	Notes	Refs
ALPHA 1	अल्फा १	Aqua Line	25 January 2019	Elevated	–	
DELTA 1	डेल्टा १	Aqua Line	25 January 2019	Elevated	–	
Depot Station†	डिपो	Aqua Line	25 January 2019	Elevated	–	
GNIDA Office	जी एन आई डी ए ऑफिस	Aqua Line	25 January 2019	Elevated	–	
Knowledge Park II	नॉलेज पार्क II	Aqua Line	25 January 2019	Elevated	–	
Noida Sector 51†*	नोएडा सेक्टर ५१	Aqua Line	25 January 2019	Elevated	Transfer station for Blue Line Delhi Metro	
Noida Sector 76	नोएडा सेक्टर ७६	Aqua Line	25 January 2019	Elevated	–	
Noida Sector 81	नोएडा सेक्टर ८१	Aqua Line	25 January 2019	Elevated	–	
Noida Sector 83	नोएडा सेक्टर ८३	Aqua Line	25 January 2019	Elevated	–	
Noida Sector 101	नोएडा सेक्टर १०१	Aqua Line	25 January 2019	Elevated	–	
Noida Sector 137	नोएडा सेक्टर १३७	Aqua Line	25 January 2019	Elevated	–	
Noida Sector 142	नोएडा सेक्टर १४२	Aqua Line	25 January 2019	Elevated	–	
Noida Sector 143	नोएडा सेक्टर १४३	Aqua Line	25 January 2019	Elevated	–	
Noida Sector 144	नोएडा सेक्टर १४४	Aqua Line	25 January 2019	Elevated	–	
Noida Sector 145	नोएडा सेक्टर १४५	Aqua Line	25 January 2019	Elevated	–	
Noida Sector 146	नोएडा सेक्टर १५३	Aqua Line	25 January 2019	Elevated	–	
Noida Sector 147	नोएडा सेक्टर १४७	Aqua Line	25 January 2019	Elevated	–	
Noida Sector 148	नोएडा सेक्टर १४८	Aqua Line	25 January 2019	Elevated	–	
NSEZ	एन एस ई ज़ेड	Aqua Line	25 January 2019	Elevated	–	
Pari Chowk	परी चौक	Aqua Line	25 January 2019	Elevated	–	
Rainbow	रेनबो	Aqua Line	25 January 2019	Elevated	Formerly known as Noida Sector 50	

== Statistics ==
Total number of metro stations	21
Total number of metro stations under construction (Phase II)	9
Number of interchange stations	1
Number of elevated stations	21
Number of underground stations	0
Number of at-grade stations	0

== See also ==
- List of Ahmedabad Metro stations
- List of Chennai Metro stations
- List of Coimbatore Metro stations
- List of Delhi Metro stations
- List of Hyderabad Metro stations
- List of Jaipur Metro stations
- List of Kochi Metro stations
- List of Kolkata Metro stations
- List of Lucknow Metro stations
- List of Madurai Metro stations
- List of Mumbai Metro stations
- List of Nagpur Metro stations
- List of Namma Metro stations
- List of Navi Mumbai Metro Stations
- List of Pune Metro stations
- List of Surat Metro stations
