= Noida Sector 76 metro station =

Metro station in Noida, India

Noida Sector 76

General information
- Location: Amrapali Princely Estate, Sector 76, Noida, Uttar Pradesh
- Coordinates: 28.5653°N 77.3797°E
- System: Noida Metro station
- Owner: Noida Metro
- Operator: Noida Metro Rail Corporation (NMRC)
- Line: Aqua Line
- Platforms: Side platform Platform-1 → Noida Sector 51; Platform-2 → Depot
- Tracks: 2

Construction
- Structure type: Elevated, Double-track
- Platform levels: 2
- Accessible: Yes

Other information
- Website: http://nmrcnoida.com

History
- Opened: 25 January 2019; 7 years ago
- Electrified: 25 kV 50 Hz AC through overhead catenary

Services
Preceding station	Noida Metro	Following station
Rainbow towards Noida Sector 51	Aqua Line	Noida Sector 101 towards Depot Station
Route map
Location
- Location within Delhi Location within Uttar Pradesh Location within India

The Noida Sector 76 is an elevated metro station on the North - South corridor of the Aqua Line of Noida Metro in the city of Noida, Uttar Pradesh. It was opened on 25 January 2019.

== Station layout ==
G	Street level	Exit/Entrance
L1	Mezzanine	Fare control, station agent, Metro Card vending machines, crossover
L2	Side platform | Doors will open on the left
L2	Platform 2 Southbound	Towards → Depot; Next Station: Noida Sector 101
L2	Platform 1 Northbound	Towards ← Noida Sector 51; Next Station: Rainbow
L2	Side platform | Doors will open on the left
L2

== Entry/Exit ==
Noida Sector 76 metro station Entry/exits
Gate No-1	Gate No-2

== See also ==
- Noida
- Noida Agra Monorail
- List of Noida metro stations
- Delhi Metro
- New Delhi
- List of rapid transit systems
- List of metro systems
- Blue Line (Delhi Metro)
- National Capital Region (India)
- Yamuna Expressway
- Noida–Greater Noida Expressway
