= ALPHA 1 metro station =

Metro station in Greater Noida, India

ALPHA 1

General information
- Location: Block E, Alpha I, Greater Noida, Uttar Pradesh, India.
- Coordinates: 28.470948°N 77.512593°E
- System: Noida-Greater Noida Metro station
- Owner: Noida Metro
- Operator: Noida Metro Rail Corporation (NMRC)
- Line: Aqua Line
- Platforms: Side platform Platform-1 → Noida Sector 51; Platform-2 → Depot
- Tracks: 2

Construction
- Structure type: Elevated, Double-track
- Platform levels: 2
- Accessible: Yes

Other information
- Website: http://nmrcnoida.com

History
- Opened: 25 January 2019; 7 years ago
- Electrified: 25 kV 50 Hz AC through overhead catenary

Services
| Preceding station | Noida Metro | Following station |
|---|---|---|
| Pari Chowk towards Noida Sector 51 | Aqua Line | DELTA 1 towards Depot Station |
Route map
Location

The ALPHA 1 is an elevated metro station on the North-South corridor of the Aqua Line of Noida Metro in the city of Noida, Uttar Pradesh. It was opened on 25 January 2019.

== The station ==
=== Station layout ===
| G | Street level | Exit/Entrance |
| L1 | Mezzanine | Fare control, station agent, Metro Card vending machines, crossover |
| L2 | Side platform | Doors will open on the left |
| L2 | Platform 2 Southbound | Towards → Depot; Next Station: DELTA 1 |
| L2 | Platform 1 Northbound | Towards ← Noida Sector 51; Next Station: Jaypee Greens Pari Chowk |
| L2 | Side platform | Doors will open on the left |
| L2 |

== See also ==
- Noida
- Noida Agra Monorail
- List of Noida metro stations
- Delhi Metro
- List of rapid transit systems
- List of metro systems
- National Capital Region (India)
- Yamuna Expressway
- Noida–Greater Noida Expressway
