= NSEZ metro station =

Noida Metro station

NSEZ

General information
- Location: Block A, Yakubpur, Noida, Uttar Pradesh 201305
- Coordinates: 28.5323°N 77.3948°E
- System: Noida Metro station
- Owner: Noida Metro
- Operator: Noida Metro Rail Corporation (NMRC)
- Line: Aqua Line
- Platforms: Side platform Platform-1 → Noida Sector 51; Platform-2 → Depot
- Tracks: 2

Construction
- Structure type: Elevated, Double-track
- Platform levels: 2
- Accessible: Yes

Other information
- Website: http://nmrcnoida.com

History
- Opened: 25 January 2019; 7 years ago
- Electrified: 25 kV 50 Hz AC through overhead catenary

Services
Preceding station	Noida Metro	Following station
Noida Sector 81 towards Noida Sector 51	Aqua Line	Noida Sector 83 towards Depot Station
Route map
Location

The NSEZ is an elevated metro station on the North-South corridor of the Aqua Line of Noida Metro in the city of Noida, Uttar Pradesh. It was opened on 25 January 2019.

== Station Layout ==
G	Street level	Exit/Entrance
L1	Mezzanine	Fare control, station agent, Metro Card vending machines, crossover
L2	Side platform | Doors will open on the left
L2	Platform 2 Southbound	Towards → Depot; Next Station: Noida Sector 83
L2	Platform 1 Northbound	Towards ← Noida Sector 51; Next Station: Noida Sector 81
L2	Side platform | Doors will open on the left
L2

== See also ==
- Noida
- Noida Agra Monorail
- List of Noida metro stations
- Delhi Metro
- New Delhi
- List of rapid transit systems
- List of metro systems
- Blue Line (Delhi Metro)
- National Capital Region (India)
- Yamuna Expressway
- Noida–Greater Noida Expressway
