= Noida Sector 52 metro station =

Metro station in Delhi, India

Noida Sector 52

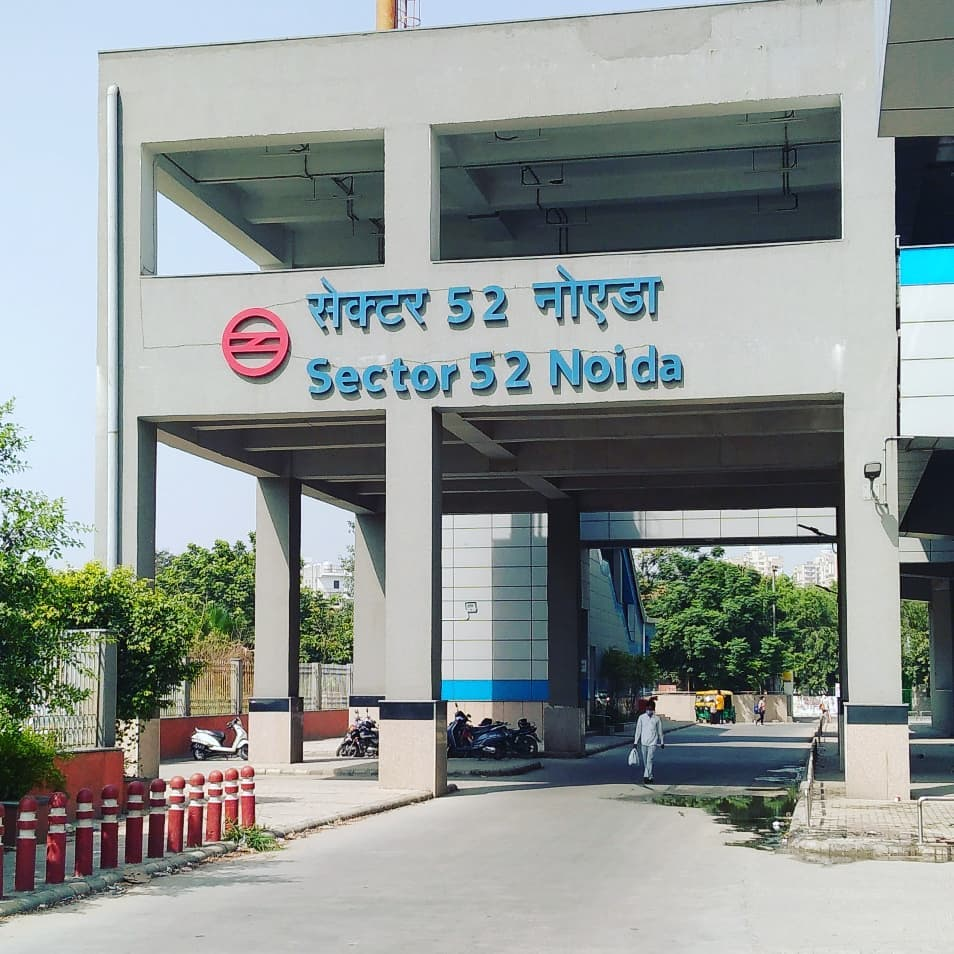

General information
- Location: Captain Shashi Kant Marg, Sector 52, Noida, Uttar Pradesh 201301
- Coordinates: 28°35′12″N 77°22′22″E
- System: Delhi Metro station
- Owner: Delhi Metro
- Operator: Delhi Metro Rail Corporation (DMRC)
- Line: Blue Line
- Platforms: Side platform; Platform-1 → Noida Electronic City; Platform-2 → Dwarka Sector 21
- Tracks: 2
- Connections: Aqua Line Noida Sector 51

Construction
- Structure type: Elevated, Double-track
- Platform levels: 2
- Accessible: Yes

Other information
- Status: Staffed, Operational
- Station code: SFTN

History
- Opened: 8 March 2019
- Electrified: Single phase 25 kV 50 Hz AC through overhead catenary

Services
Preceding station	Delhi Metro	Following station
Noida Sector 34 towards Dwarka Sector 21	Blue Line	Noida Sector 61 towards Noida Electronic City
Out-of-system interchange
Preceding station	Noida Metro	Following station
Terminus	Aqua Line transfer at Noida Sector 51	Noida Sector 50 towards Depot Station
Route map
Location

Noida Sector 52 is an elevated metro station on the Blue Line of the Delhi Metro, located in Noida, Uttar Pradesh.

Noida Sector 52 is connected to Noida Sector 51 station on the Aqua Line of the Noida Metro by an elevated, 400 metres (1,300 ft) long pedestrian skywalk. The air-conditioned skywalk, equipped with travelators, was opened on 28 August 2026, providing an interchange between the Blue Line and the Aqua Line.

Separately, under an agreement with the Noida Authority, INGKA Centres, the parent company of IKEA, was to develop a passageway connecting the two metro stations with its proposed retail complex in Sector 51.

== History ==
Construction of the Noida City Centre–Noida Electronic City extension began in August 2015. The 6.67 km (4.14 mi) section, which includes Noida Sector 52 station, was completed and inaugurated on 9 March 2019. It was opened to passengers on the same day.

== Station Layout ==
L2	Side platform | Doors will open on the left
L2	Platform 1 Eastbound	Towards → Noida Electronic City; Next Station: Noida Sector 61
L2	Platform 2 Westbound	Towards ← Dwarka Sector 21; Next Station: Noida Sector 34
L2	Side platform | Doors will open on the left
L1	Concourse	Fare control, station agent, Metro Card vending machines, crossover
G	Street level	Exit/Entrance

== Entry/Exit ==
Noida Sector 52 metro station Entry/exits
Gate No-1	Gate No-2	Gate No-3

== See also ==
- Delhi
- Noida
- List of Delhi Metro stations
- Transport in Delhi
- Delhi Metro Rail Corporation
- Delhi Suburban Railway
- Delhi Monorail
- Delhi Transport Corporation
- South East Delhi
- New Delhi
- National Capital Region (India)
- Noida–Greater Noida Expressway
- Noida Metro
- List of rapid transit systems
- List of metro systems
