= Pari Chowk metro station =

Metro station in Greater Noida, India

Jaypee Greens Pari Chowk

General information
- Location: Tugalpur Village, Greater Noida, Uttar Pradesh 201310
- Coordinates: 28.463276°N 77.508196°E
- System: Noida-Greater Noida Metro station
- Line: Aqua Line
- Platforms: Side platform Platform-1 → Noida Sector 51; Platform-2 → Depot

Construction
- Structure type: Elevated

Other information
- Website: http://nmrcnoida.com

History
- Opened: 25 January 2019; 7 years ago
- Electrified: 25 kVA

Services
Preceding station	Noida Metro	Following station
Knowledge Park II towards Noida Sector 51	Aqua Line	ALPHA 1 towards Depot Station
Route map
Location

The Jaypee Greens Pari Chowk is an elevated metro station on the North-South corridor of the Aqua Line of Noida Metro in the area of Knowledge Park I, Greater Noida, Uttar Pradesh, India. It was opened on 25 January 2019.

== The station ==
This station is a part of Noida metro rail corporation's Aqua Line. Passengers won't be able to use their DMRC smart card on this line and there is no interlink as yet between Aqua line and other lines of Delhi metro. Soon NMRC metro linked with blue line Delhi metro. The market place around the metro Station is Ansal Plaza.

=== Station layout ===
G	Street level	Exit/Entrance
L1	Mezzanine	Fare control, station agent, Metro Card vending machines, crossover
L2	Side platform | Doors will open on the left
L2	Platform 2 Southbound	Towards → Depot; Next Station: ALPHA 1
L2	Platform 1 Northbound	Towards ← Noida Sector 51; Next Station: Knowledge Park II
L2	Side platform | Doors will open on the left
L2
