= Depot Station metro station =

'Depot Station' or simply just 'Depot' metro station may refer to several stations of the cities' metro rail network:

- Depot Station metro station (Delhi Metro) - a Red Line station for Delhi Metro, towards Nathupur in the West extension
- Depot Station metro station (Noida Metro) - an Aqua Line station for Noida Metro, the terminus of South extension
