= Gamma I, Greater Noida =

Gamma 1
- Locality
- Location in Uttar Pradesh, India
- Coordinates: 28°29′6″N 77°30′1″E
- Country: India
- State: Uttar Pradesh
- District: Gautam Buddha Nagar

Government
  - Body: Greater Noida Industrial Development Authority

Languages
  - Official: Hindi, English
- Time zone: UTC+5:30 (IST)
- PIN: 201308

Gamma I or Gamma 1 is a commercial-cum residential locality in western Greater Noida, Uttar Pradesh, India. Bordered by Gamma II to the east, Beta I to the south and Knowledge Park III and Knowledge Park I to the west, it is considered one of the affluent neighborhoods in the city and is also known for serving the Jagat Farm market and Kadamba Shopping Complex.

== Landmarks ==
- Jagat Farm market
- Kadamba Shopping Complex
- Shram Vihar Park
