= Noida Sector 143 metro station =

Metro station in Noida, India

Noida Sector 143

General information
- Location: Sector 143B, Noida, Uttar Pradesh 201306
- Coordinates: 28.494461°N 77.422179°E
- System: Noida Metro station
- Line: Aqua Line
- Platforms: Side platform Platform-1 → Noida Sector 51; Platform-2 → Depot

Construction
- Structure type: Elevated

Other information
- Website: http://nmrcnoida.com

History
- Opened: 25 January 2019; 7 years ago

Services
Preceding station	Noida Metro	Following station
Noida Sector 142 towards Noida Sector 51	Aqua Line	Noida Sector 144 towards Depot Station
Location

The Noida Sector 143 is an elevated metro station on the North-South corridor of the Aqua Line of Noida Metro in the city of Noida, Uttar Pradesh. It was opened on 25 January 2019.

== The station ==
It serves residents from Logix Blossom Greens, Gulshan Ikebana etc.

=== Station layout ===
G	Street level	Exit/Entrance
L1	Mezzanine	Fare control, station agent, Metro Card vending machines, crossover
L2	Side platform | Doors will open on the left
L2	Platform 2 Southbound	Towards → Depot; Next Station: Noida Sector 144
L2	Platform 1 Northbound	Towards ← Noida Sector 51; Next Station: Noida Sector 142
L2	Side platform | Doors will open on the left
L2
