= Knowledge Park II metro station =

Metro station in Greater Noida, India

Knowledge Park II

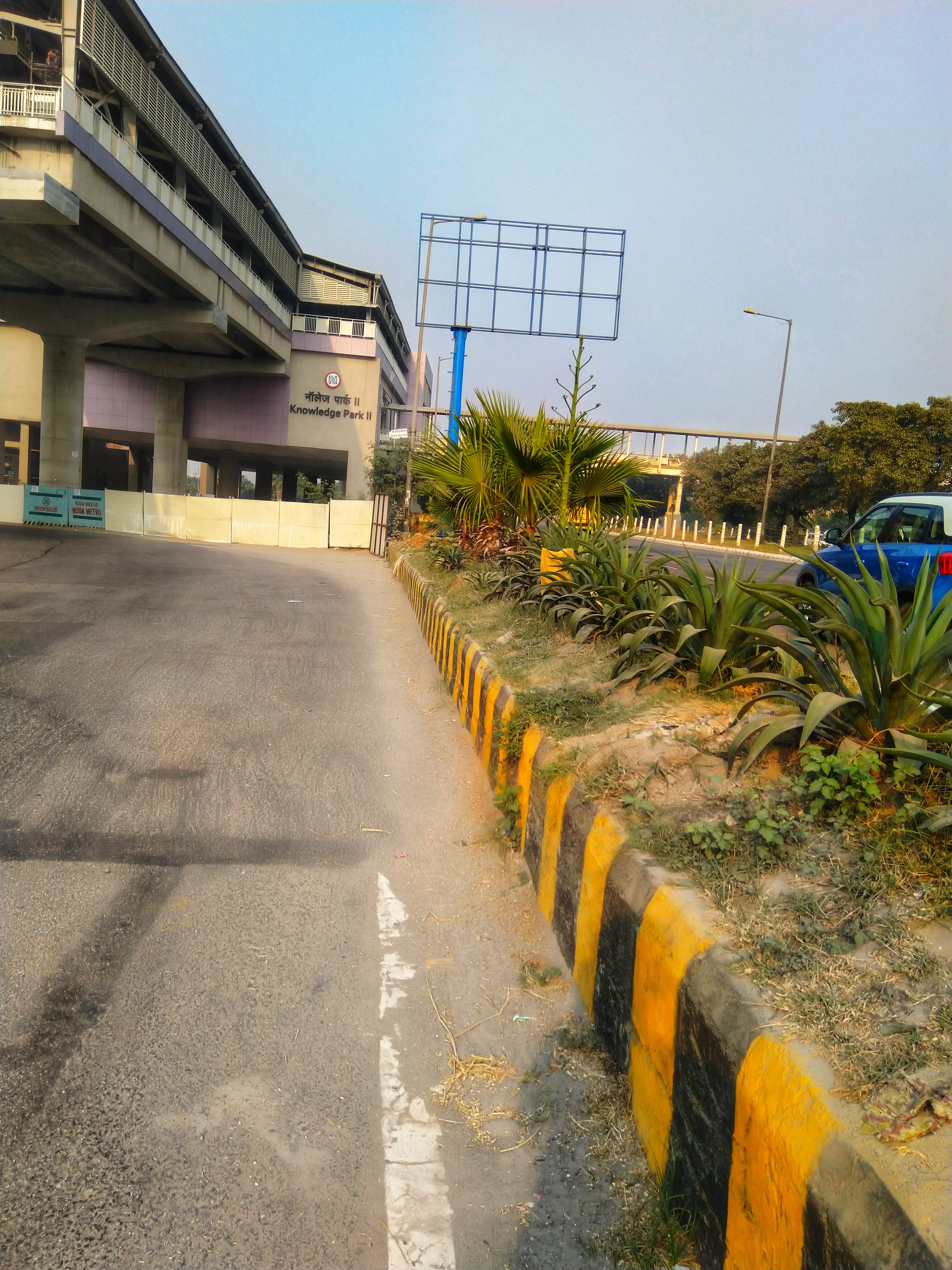
- Outside view of the station

General information
- Location: Knowledge Park II, Greater Noida, Uttar Pradesh 201310; India
- Coordinates: 28.456956°N 77.500189°E
- System: Noida Metro station
- Owner: Noida Metro
- Operator: NMRC
- Line: Aqua Line
- Platforms: Side platform Platform-1 → Noida Sector 51; Platform-2 → Depot

Construction
- Structure type: Elevated
- Parking: Not Available

Other information
- Status: Operational
- Website: http://nmrcnoida.com

History
- Opened: 25 January 2019; 7 years ago
- Electrified: 25 kVA

Services
Preceding station	Noida Metro	Following station
Noida Sector 148 towards Noida Sector 51	Aqua Line	Pari Chowk towards Depot Station
Route map
Location

The Knowledge Park II is an elevated metro station on the North-South corridor of the Aqua Line of Noida Metro in the area of Knowledge Park II, Greater Noida, Uttar Pradesh, India. It was opened on 25 January 2019.

== The station ==
The station is located near Knowledge Park II. It serves students from Sharda University, KCC Institute of Legal & Higher Education affiliated to GGSIP University New Delhi, Galgotias College of Engineering and Technology, Skyline Institute of Engineering and Technology, Birla Institute of Management Technology and Mangalmay Institute of Engineering & Technology. Ishan Institute of management and Technology from 1995 for MBA, BBA, BCA, BCom Hons, Law, BAM, Pharma courses, The metro station has a lot of food points to have auto stand down the metro station where you can auto for any college of towards surajpur or dadri

=== Station layout ===
G	Street level	Exit/Entrance
L1	Mezzanine	Fare control, station agent, Metro Card vending machines, crossover
L2	Side platform | Doors will open on the left
L2	Platform 2 Southbound	Towards → Depot; Next Station: Jaypee Greens Pari Chowk
L2	Platform 1 Northbound	Towards ← Noida Sector 51; Next Station: Noida Sector 148
L2	Side platform | Doors will open on the left
L2
