= Noida Sector 59 metro station =

Metro station in Delhi, India

Noida Sector 59

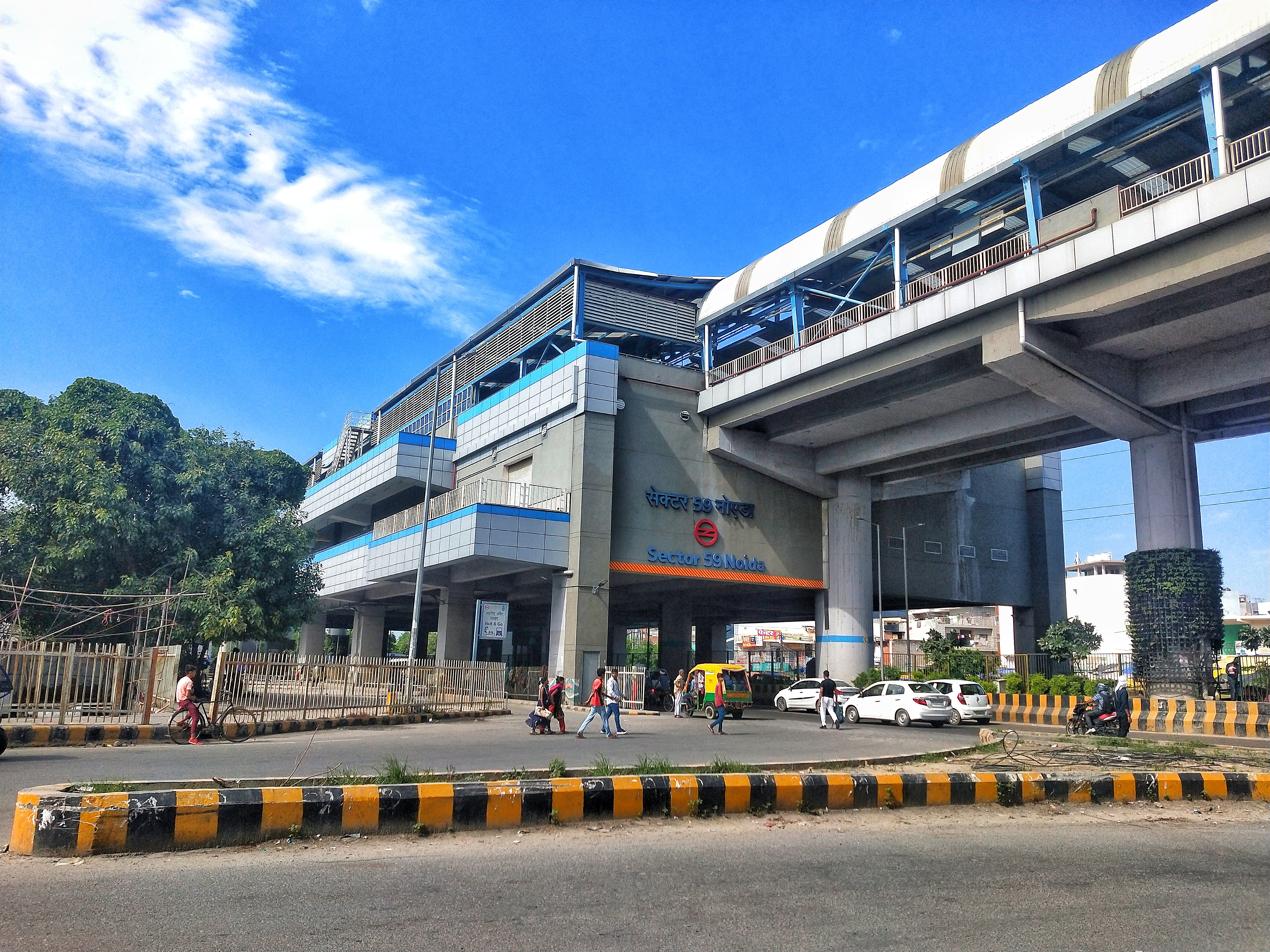

General information
- Location: Sector 59 Noida, Uttar Pradesh 201307
- Coordinates: 28°36′23″N 77°22′22″E
- System: Delhi Metro station
- Owner: Delhi Metro
- Operator: Delhi Metro Rail Corporation (DMRC)
- Line: Blue Line
- Platforms: Side platform; Platform-1 → Noida Electronic City; Platform-2 → Dwarka Sector 21
- Tracks: 2

Construction
- Structure type: Elevated, Double-track
- Platform levels: 2
- Accessible: Yes

Other information
- Status: Staffed, Operational
- Station code: SFNN

History
- Opened: 8 March 2019
- Electrified: Single phase 25 kV 50 Hz AC through overhead catenary

Services
Preceding station	Delhi Metro	Following station
Noida Sector 61 towards Dwarka Sector 21	Blue Line	Noida Sector 62 towards Noida Electronic City
Route map
Location

The Noida Sector 59 is a metro station on the Blue Line extension of the Delhi Metro railway, in the city of Noida in India.

== History ==
Construction work began in 2015 and was completed on 8 March 2019.

=== Station layout ===
L2	Side platform | Doors will open on the left
L2	Platform 1 Eastbound	Towards → Noida Electronic City; Next Station: Noida Sector 62
L2	Platform 2 Westbound	Towards ← Dwarka Sector 21; Next Station: Noida Sector 61
L2	Side platform | Doors will open on the left
L1	Concourse	Fare control, station agent, Metro Card vending machines, crossover
G	Street level	Exit/Entrance

== Entry/Exit ==
Noida Sector 59 metro station Entry/exits
Gate No-1	Gate No-2
Mamura Chok	Mamura Village

== See also ==
- Delhi
- Noida
- List of Delhi Metro stations
- Transport in Delhi
- Delhi Metro Rail Corporation
- Delhi Suburban Railway
- Delhi Monorail
- Delhi Transport Corporation
- South East Delhi
- New Delhi
- National Capital Region (India)
- Noida–Greater Noida Expressway
- Noida Metro
- List of rapid transit systems
- List of metro systems
