= Noida Sector 101 metro station =

Metro station in Noida, India

Noida Sector 101

General information
- Location: Sector 79, Noida, Uttar Pradesh 201305
- Coordinates: 28.556402°N 77.384798°E
- System: Noida Metro station
- Line: Aqua Line
- Platforms: Side platform Platform-1 → Noida Sector 51; Platform-2 → Depot

Construction
- Structure type: Elevated

Other information
- Website: http://nmrcnoida.com

History
- Opened: 25 January 2019; 7 years ago

Services
Preceding station	Noida Metro	Following station
Noida Sector 76 towards Noida Sector 51	Aqua Line	Noida Sector 81 towards Depot Station
Route map
Location
- Location within Delhi

The Noida Sector 101 is an elevated metro station on the North-South corridor of the Aqua Line of Noida Metro in the city of Noida, Uttar Pradesh. It was opened on 25 January 2019.

== Station layout ==
G	Street level	Exit/Entrance
L1	Mezzanine	Fare control, station agent, Metro Card vending machines, crossover
L2	Side platform | Doors will open on the left
L2	Platform 2 Southbound	Towards → Depot; Next Station: Noida Sector 81
L2	Platform 1 Northbound	Towards ← Noida Sector 51; Next Station: Noida Sector 76
L2	Side platform | Doors will open on the left
L2
