= Noida Sector 83 metro station =

Metro station in Noida, India

Noida Sector 83

General information
- Location: Yakubpur, Noida, Uttar Pradesh 201305
- Coordinates: 28.522206°N 77.396545°E
- System: Noida Metro station
- Line: Aqua Line
- Platforms: Side platform Platform-1 → Noida Sector 51; Platform-2 → Depot

Construction
- Structure type: Elevated

Other information
- Website: http://nmrcnoida.com

History
- Opened: 25 January 2019; 7 years ago

Services
Preceding station	Noida Metro	Following station
NSEZ towards Noida Sector 51	Aqua Line	Noida Sector 137 towards Depot Station
Route map
Location

The Noida Sector 83 is an elevated metro station on the North - South corridor of the Aqua Line of Noida Metro in the city of Noida, Uttar Pradesh. It was opened on 25 January 2019.

== Station layout ==
G	Street level	Exit/Entrance
L1	Mezzanine	Fare control, station agent, Metro Card vending machines, crossover
L2	Side platform | Doors will open on the left
L2	Platform 2 Southbound	Towards → Depot; Next Station: Noida Sector 137
L2	Platform 1 Northbound	Towards ← Noida Sector 51; Next Station: NSEZ
L2	Side platform | Doors will open on the left
L2
