= Noida Sector 137 metro station =

Metro station in Noida, India

Noida Sector 137

General information
- Location: Sector 137, Noida, Bajidpur, Uttar Pradesh 201305
- Coordinates: 28.510870°N 77.403453°E
- System: Metro station
- Line: Aqua Line
- Platforms: Side platform Platform-1 → Noida Sector 51; Platform-2 → Depot

Construction
- Structure type: Elevated

Other information
- Website: http://nmrcnoida.com

History
- Opened: 25 January 2019; 7 years ago

Services
| Preceding station | Noida Metro | Following station |
|---|---|---|
| Noida Sector 83 towards Noida Sector 51 | Aqua Line | Noida Sector 142 towards Depot Station |
Route map
Location

The Noida Sector 137 is an elevated metro station on the North - South corridor of the Aqua Line of Noida Metro in the city of Noida, Uttar Pradesh. It was opened on 25 January 2019.

== The station ==
It is a very important metro station of the Noida Metro. Nearest residential societies are: Ajnara Daffodil, Logix Blossom County, Exotica Fresco, Paramount Floraville, Paras Tierra, Gulshan Vivante, Purvanchal Royal Park and Supertech Ecocity. Felix hospital is located approximately 200 meter from this metro station. KPMG office is another popular landmark nearest to this metro station. However, the distance between KPMG office and metro station is around 400 meter. McDonald and Subway food points are available at the ground floor of KPMG office building. Medical shops, Shopping basket, hair salons, food points, ATMs of different banks are also available in each residential society market.

== Station layout ==
| G | Street level | Exit/Entrance |
| L1 | Mezzanine | Fare control, station agent, Metro Card vending machines, crossover |
| L2 | Side platform | Doors will open on the left |
| L2 | Platform 2 Southbound | Towards → Depot; Next Station: Noida Sector 142 |
| L2 | Platform 1 Northbound | Towards ← Noida Sector 51; Next Station: Noida Sector 83 |
| L2 | Side platform | Doors will open on the left |
| L2 |
