= Noida Sector 78 metro station =

Metro station in Noida, India

Noida Sector 78 नोएडा सेक्टर ७८

General information
- System: Noida Metro station
- Platforms: Side platform

Construction
- Structure type: Elevated

Other information
- Website: http://nmrcnoida.com

The Noida Sector 78 is a metro station of the Noida Metro railway in the city of Noida in India. It adjoins sector 76, 77, and sector 78 of Noida, covering around 100,000 population of Noida.

The metro station is on the Aqua line of NMRC. International Women's Day on 7 March 2020 saw the station turning pink with all women staff and many other initiates.
