= Dadri Road metro station =

Metro station in Noida, India

Dadri Road दादरी रोड

General information
- System: Noida Metro station
- Platforms: Side platform

Construction
- Structure type: Elevated

Other information
- Website: http://nmrcnoida.com

The Dadri Road is an under construction metro station of the Noida Metro railway, in the city of Noida in India.
