= Noida Sector 146 metro station =

Metro station in Noida, India

Noida Sector 146

General information
- Location: Sector 146, Noida, Jhatta, Uttar Pradesh 201310
- Coordinates: 28.468877°N 77.454964°E
- System: Noida Metro station
- Line: Aqua Line
- Platforms: Side platform Platform-1 → Noida Sector 51; Platform-2 → Depot

Construction
- Structure type: Elevated

Other information
- Website: http://nmrcnoida.com

History
- Opened: 25 January 2019; 7 years ago

Services
| Preceding station | Noida Metro | Following station |
|---|---|---|
| Noida Sector 145 towards Noida Sector 51 | Aqua Line | Noida Sector 147 towards Depot Station |
Route map
Location

The Noida Sector 146 is an elevated metro station on the North-South corridor of the Aqua Line of Noida Metro in the city of Noida, Uttar Pradesh. It was opened on 25 January 2019.

== Station layout ==
| G | Street level | Exit/Entrance |
| L1 | Mezzanine | Fare control, station agent, Metro Card vending machines, crossover |
| L2 | Side platform | Doors will open on the left |
| L2 | Platform 2 Southbound | Towards → Depot; Next Station: Noida Sector 147 |
| L2 | Platform 1 Northbound | Towards ← Noida Sector 51; Next Station: Noida Sector 145 |
| L2 | Side platform | Doors will open on the left |
| L2 |
