= National Highway 334DD (India) =

National Highway in India

National Highway 334DD
- Map of National Highway 334DD in red

Route information
- Auxiliary route of NH 34
- Length: 46.7 km (29.0 mi)

Major junctions
- South end: Hamidpur
- North end: Bulandshahr

Location
- Country: India
- States: Uttar Pradesh

Highway system
- Roads in India; Expressways; National; State; Asian
← NH 334D	→ NH 34

National Highway 334DD, commonly referred to as NH 334DD is a national highway in India. It is a secondary route of National Highway 34. NH-334DD runs in the state of Uttar Pradesh in India.

There are proposals to widen the entire route from Hamidpur to Bulandshahr, and construction is slated to begin soon.

== Route ==
NH334DD connects Hamidpur, Jewar, Jhajhar, Kakod, Thana Chola, Bulandshahr in the state of Uttar Pradesh.

The construction of Noida International Airport has led to a discontinuation in the route, between the villages of Ranhara and Kishorpur

== Junctions ==
NH 334D Terminal near Hamidpur.
Junction with Yamuna Expressway near Jewar
NH 34 Terminal near Bulandshahar.

== See also ==
- List of national highways in India
- List of national highways in India by state
