= Pandit Deendayal Upadhyaya Institute of Archaeology =

Archaeological research institute in India

Pandit Deendayal Upadhyaya Institute of Archaeology is an institute functioning under the Archaeological Survey of India which is under the Ministry of Culture, Govt of India. The institute is located adjacent to Galgotias College of Engineering and Technology in Knowledge Park II area of Greater Noida, Uttar Pradesh, India. Inaugurated by Prime Minister Narendra Modi on 9 March 2019, the institute aims "to provide archaeological opportunities to all and to play a major role in furthering the understanding of archaeological and historical past of the Indian subcontinent, and to remain in the forefront of international research in archaeological sciences ...".

The physical infrastructure of the institute, built at an estimated cost of ₹289 crore, includes a campus spread over 25 acres of land, a 3-star green building equipped with all latest technologies, an auditorium with seating capacity of 1000 people, an open air theatre and an Archaeological Museum.

== History ==
The name "Pandit Deendayal Upadhyaya Institute of Archaeology" is a rechristening of the name a then existing institute known as "Institute of Archaeology" functioning under Archaeological Survey of India. This Institute of Archaeology was established in the year 1985 by upgrading the School of Archaeology which was established in 1959 for imparting advanced training in multidisciplinary field of Archaeology, Epigraphy, Numismatics, Museology, Conservation, Antiquarian law, etc.

== Programmes of study ==
The Institute offers a two-year Post Graduate Diploma in Archaeology (PGDA). The programme includes courses on applications of science in archaeology, art and iconography, epigraphy, numismatics, museology, etc.

As of April 2026, the Institute had only 15 students and no permanent faculty.
