= Noida Sector 149 metro station =

Metro station in Noida, India

Noida Sector 149 नोएडा सेक्टर १४९

General information
- System: Noida Metro station
- Platforms: Side platform

Construction
- Structure type: Elevated

Other information
- Website: http://nmrcnoida.com

The Noida Sector 149 is an under-construction metro station of the Noida Metro railway, in the city of Noida in India.
