= Noida City Centre metro station =

Metro station in Delhi, India

Wave Noida City Centre

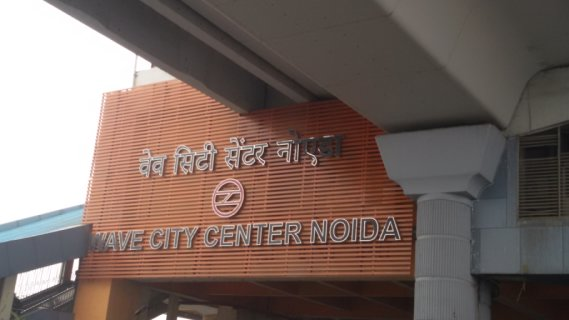

General information
- Location: Sector 39, Noida, Uttar Pradesh 201303
- Coordinates: 28°34′29″N 77°21′22″E
- System: Delhi Metro station
- Owner: Delhi Metro
- Operator: Delhi Metro Rail Corporation (DMRC)
- Line: Blue Line
- Platforms: Side platform; Platform-1 → Noida Electronic City; Platform-2 → Dwarka Sector 21
- Tracks: 2

Construction
- Structure type: Elevated, Double-track
- Platform levels: 2
- Parking: Available
- Accessible: Yes

Other information
- Status: Staffed, Operational
- Station code: NCC

History
- Opened: 12 November 2009; 17 years ago
- Electrified: 25 kV 50 Hz AC through overhead catenary

Passengers
- Jan 2015: 31,226/day 968,015/ Month average

Services
Preceding station	Delhi Metro	Following station
Golf Course towards Dwarka Sector 21	Blue Line	Noida Sector 34 towards Noida Electronic City
Route map
Location

Noida City Centre, also known as Wave City Center, is an elevated metro station on the Blue Line of the Delhi Metro in Noida, Uttar Pradesh. The station was renamed Wave City Center, Noida in October 2015 after DMRC awarded naming rights to Wave Infratech. It served as the eastern terminus of the Blue Line's Noida branch until 8 March 2019. Following the opening of the extension to Noida Electronic City on 9 March 2019, it became an intermediate station on the line. Trains from the station operate towards Dwarka Sector 21 and Noida Electronic City.

== Repair in 2013 ==
=== Problem reported ===
During a routine inspection on 16 September 2013, the Delhi Metro Rail Corporation (DMRC) detected deflection in a cantilever arm supporting one of the platforms at Noida City Centre station. The defect caused part of the platform to sag and develop cracks. DMRC also inspected other stations along the corridor but found no similar problems.

=== Consequences ===
During the repair work, one of the station's platforms was temporarily taken out of service, and trains were operated at reduced speeds near the station. This increased train waiting times and extended journey times along the Noida branch of the Blue Line. The station was temporarily closed for two days to facilitate repair work, while services continued using one platform for most of the repair period. Normal operations resumed on 19 November 2013.

=== Reaction ===
DMRC constituted a high-level inquiry committee to investigate the structural defect. The committee attributed the problem to the contractor's failure to follow approved structural drawings for reinforcement placement and inadequate supervision by DMRC engineers. Following the inquiry, two engineers were suspended. The services of Junior Engineer Vikas Tyagi were subsequently terminated, while disciplinary proceedings were initiated against Executive Engineer Sanjay Varshney.

== Station ==
=== Station layout ===
L2	Side platform | Doors will open on the left
L2	Platform 1 Northbound	Towards → Noida Electronic City; Next Station: Noida Sector 34
L2	Platform 2 Westbound	Towards ← Dwarka Sector 21; Next Station: Golf Course
L2	Side platform | Doors will open on the left
L1	Concourse	Fare control, station agent, Metro Card vending machines, crossover
G	Street level	Exit/Entrance

=== Facilities ===
List of available ATM at Noida City Centre metro station are HDFC Bank, Punjab National Bank

== Entry/Exit ==
Noida City Centre metro station Entry/exits
Gate No-1	Gate No-2	Gate No-3	Gate No-4
Towards City Center Parking and Logix City Center Mall	Towards Electrical Substation and Public Toilet	Stair Case Exit towards Noida City Center Parking	Stair Case Exit Only towards Pink Toilet
Sector 21-A Side	Sector 39 Side		

== Connections ==
=== Bus ===
Delhi Transport Corporation bus routes number 34, 323, 347, 347A, 555 serves the station from outside metro station stop.

== See also ==
- Delhi
- Noida
- List of Delhi Metro stations
- Transport in Delhi
- Delhi Metro Rail Corporation
- Delhi Suburban Railway
- Delhi Monorail
- Delhi Transport Corporation
- South East Delhi
- New Delhi
- National Capital Region (India)
- Noida–Greater Noida Expressway
- Noida Metro
- List of rapid transit systems
- List of metro systems
