= Rainbow metro station =

Metro station in Noida, Uttar Pradesh, India

Noida Sector 50/Rainbow

General information
- Location: Vishwakarma Rd, Sector 50, Noida Uttar Pradesh, India.
- Coordinates: 28.574518°N 77.3772057°E
- System: Noida Metro station
- Owner: Noida Metro
- Operator: Noida Metro Rail Corporation (NMRC)
- Line: Aqua Line
- Platforms: Side platform Platform-1 → Noida Sector 51; Platform-2 → Depot
- Tracks: 2

Construction
- Structure type: Elevated, Double-track
- Platform levels: 2
- Accessible: Yes

Other information
- Website: http://nmrcnoida.com

History
- Opened: 25 January 2019; 7 years ago
- Electrified: 25 kV 50 Hz AC through overhead catenary

Services
Preceding station	Noida Metro	Following station
Noida Sector 51 Terminus	Aqua Line	Noida Sector 76 towards Depot Station
Route map
Location
- Location within Delhi Location within Uttar Pradesh Location within India

The Rainbow metro station (formerly known as Noida Sector 50) is an elevated metro station on the North-South corridor of the Aqua Line of Noida Metro in the city of Noida, Uttar Pradesh. It was opened on 25 January 2019. In June 2020, the NMRC announced that the would be renamed Rainbow station and dedicated to the transgender community.

== Station layout ==
G	Street level	Exit/Entrance
L1	Mezzanine	Fare control, station agent, Metro Card vending machines, crossover
L2	Side platform | Doors will open on the left
L2	Platform 2 Southbound	Towards → Depot; Next Station: Noida Sector 76
L2	Platform 1 Northbound	Towards ← Noida Sector 51
L2	Side platform | Doors will open on the left
L2

== Entry/Exit ==
Noida Sector 50 metro station Entry/exits
Gate No-1	Gate No-2

== See also ==
- List of Noida metro stations
