= Gamma II, Greater Noida =

Gamma 2
- Locality
- Location in Uttar Pradesh, India
- Coordinates: 28°29′25″N 77°30′33″E
- Country: India
- State: Uttar Pradesh
- District: Gautam Buddha Nagar

Languages
  - Official: Hindi, English
- Time zone: UTC+5:30 (IST)
- PIN: 201310

Gamma II or Gamma 2 is a residential locality in western Greater Noida, Uttar Pradesh, India. Bordered by Gamma I to the west, Delta III to the east and Beta II to the south, it is considered one of the affluent neighborhoods in the city. The neighborhood once served the registry office of Greater Noida Industrial Development Authority.

== Landmarks ==
- Delhi Public School, Greater Noida
