= Jaypee Infratech =

Indian real estate developer

Jaypee Infratech Ltd
- Type: Public
- Traded as: BSE: 533207; NSE: JPINFRATEC
- Industry: Real estate
- Founded: 5 April 2007
- Founder: Manoj Gaur
- Defunct: 24 May 2024
- Headquarters: Noida, India
- Number of locations: 10
- Area served: India
- Key people: Manoj Gaur (Chairman & Managing Director, Jaypee Infratech Ltd),
- Products: Residential buildings, Commercial complex, Township;
- Website: jaypeeinfratech.com

Jaypee Infratech Ltd (JIL) was an Indian real estate company with its head office in Noida, Gautam Buddha Nagar, India. JIL was formed by Manoj Gaur elder son of Indian Entrepreneur Jaiprakash Gaur, the owner of Jaypee Group. The company was majorly engaged in the development and construction of real estate, comprising expressways, and commercial and residential buildings. The company was maintaining and developing the Yamuna Expressway Project, a 165-kilometer (km) long six-lane expressway from Greater Noida to Agra. Jaypee Infratech Ltd was also listed on the Bombay Stock Exchange (BSE) and the National Stock Exchange (NSE).

In 2023, Gaurs took over a few of Jaypee Infratech's projects.

== Projects ==
- Yamuna Expressway
- Jaypee Greens Wish Town
- Jaypee Greens Klassic
- Jaypee Greens Kosmos
- Jaypee Greens Aman

== Jaypee Infratech insolvency case ==
In 2007, Jaypee Infratech Limited (JIL) proposed to build 32,000 housing units and plots after signing an agreement with Yamuna Expressway Industrial Development Authority (YEIDA) to collect tolls on the expressway for 36 years and was allotted 25,000 hectares of land in Noida and Greater Noida and near Dankaur.

However, the projects soon became part of what is widely referred to as the Jaypee Infratech homebuyers fraud, as thousands of buyers alleged that funds were mismanaged and diverted, while promised homes were not delivered. Construction stalled around 2013–2014, leaving a large number of homebuyers stranded despite having paid substantial amounts. Later, the Suraksha Group acquired these projects from Jaypee Infratech and won the case and now over 20,000 homebuyers will get their homes which they had booked over a decade ago.
