= Ansal Plaza =

Shopping mall in Delhi, India

Coordinates: 28.562677°N 77.224451°E

== Ansal Plaza, Delhi ==
Ansal Plaza, Delhi is the oldest major shopping mall of Delhi as well as the third oldest in India. It was opened on 1 November 1999 with the launch of Shoppers Stop in Delhi (its first branch to be part of a mall, now Decathlon Khel Gaon). The mall was established by Ansal Properties & Infrastructure Ltd. It is located at Andrews Ganj on Khel Gaon Marg, in South Delhi and has a gross leasable area of 178,000 sq ft (16,500 m^{2}). The mall has an amphitheatre enclaved within the circular shaped plaza. It has parking facilities for 1000 cars. After the success of Ansal Plaza, Delhi, AIMS Ansals opened many more malls in several places of India.

== Ansal Crown Plaza, Faridabad ==
Ansal Crown Plaza is one of the biggest malls of Faridabad. It is located on Mathura Road in Sector-15A and close to Neelam Chowk Ajronda metro station. It was launched in 2003 and has a gross leasable area of 300,000 sq ft (28,000 m^{2}).

== Ansal Plaza, Ludhiana ==
Ansal Plaza, Ludhiana is located on Ferozepur Road in Gurdev Nagar, Ludhiana. It was opened in 2005 and has a gross leasable area of 250,000 sq ft (23,000 m^{2}).

== Ansal Plaza, Ghaziabad ==
Ansal Plaza, Ghaziabad was inaugurated in 2005 and it is one of the oldest malls of Ghaziabad. It is located near Dabur Chowk at Vaishali. It has a gross leasable area of 200,000 sq ft (19,000 m^{2}).

== Ansal Plaza, Gurgaon ==
Ansal Plaza, Gurgaon is located in Palam Vihar, an upscale locality of Gurgaon. The mall is close to Rezang La Chowk in Sector-23. It was launched in 2007 and has a gross leasable area of 260,000 sq ft (24,000 m^{2}).

== Ansal Royal Plaza, Jodhpur ==
Ansal Royal Plaza was inaugurated in 2007 and it is one of the oldest malls of Jodhpur. It is located on High Court Road, close to Nai Sarak Chauraha. It has a gross leasable area of 136,000 sq ft (12,600 m^{2}).

== Ansal Highway Plaza, Sonipat ==
Ansal Highway Plaza is located at Sector-62 in Kundli, Sonipat. It was opened in 2008 and has a gross leasable area of 250,000 sq ft (23,000 m^{2}).

== Ansal Plaza, Greater Noida ==
Ansal Plaza, Greater Noida is the first shopping mall of Greater Noida. It is located at Pari Chowk in Amit Nagar. The mall was inaugurated in 2009 and has a gross leasable area of 750,000 sq ft (70,000 m^{2}).
