= Delhi Public School, Greater Noida =

Coordinates: 28.49°N 77.50°E

- Gamma II, Greater Noida; Uttar Pradesh; India

Information
- Type: Primary, middle, secondary
- Motto: Service Before Self
- Established: 1998
- Chairperson: Kaushik Dutta, DPS Society
- Principal: Seema Roy
- Staff: 250
- Enrollment: 4600 (approx.)
- Classes: K-12
- Campus size: 15 acres (6.1 ha)
- Affiliation: CBSE
- Website: www.dpsgrnoida.com

Delhi Public School, Greater Noida also known as DPS, Greater Noida is a K–12 co-ed English-medium school in Gamma II, Greater Noida in the state of Uttar Pradesh, India. The school is affiliated with the Central Board of Secondary Education, New Delhi from class nursery to XII and is one of the core schools of the Delhi Public School Society. The current principal is Seema Roy.

== History ==
The school was established in 1998 and Ranjeev Taneja was the founder principal. He is presently the secretary of DPS Society. DPS Greater Noida is divided into three wings: junior, middle and senior school. It has around 4,900 students and 400 faculty members.

== Academics ==
The school follows curriculum designed by the Central Board of Secondary Education. Subjects taught are - English, Hindi, Maths, EVS, Science, Social Science, Sanskrit/French/German/Spanish/Japanese as third language, Physics, Chemistry, Mathematics, Physical Education, Economics, Psychology, Accounts, Business Studies, Information Practices, Entrepreneurship, Political Science, History, Geography. The schools has claimed toppers in CBSE Class XII exams.

== Sports ==
The school hosted the National Inter DPS Multi Sports Meet for Girls (under 19) 2014 from 27 to 29 December 2014. Nearly 600 girls from 47 Delhi Public Schools across the country participated in the event.

The school also hosted the National Level Inter DPS Badminton and Table Tennis Championship 2009 from 24 to 26 July 2009.

== Co-curricular activities ==
A wide range of co-curricular activities are organized to supplement the academic programme, such as Art & Craft club, Music (Vocal and instrumental), Indian and Western Dance, Activity clubs, Quiz club (Qureka), Taekwondo, Skating, Yoga, Public Speaking, Dramatics, Book club, Best out of waste, Nature club, Cooking without fire, Clay modeling, German Club, Japanese club, Spanish club, English Theater, English Creative Writing, English Debate, Hindi Theater, Hindi Debate, Embroidery and Fabric Painting, Cookery, Environment club and Gardening, Kathak Dance, Science Quiz & Club, Astronomy club, Fashion Designing, Eco projects, Calligraphy club, Robotics club, Cyber club and many more. The school has won many competitions in its recent history in Inter DPS annual festivals and runner up in Dr PK Khasnavis memorial inter-school debate ('against the motion') organized by DPS Rohini. It also hosted the Inter - DPS Science Fest in 2019.

== Controversies ==
A 3-year old girl was reportedly raped in the school premises (swimming pool) by a life guard, reportedly by the name Chandidas. It led to a huge backlash and protests, the principal and lifeguard got booked. Chandidas was eventually proven guilty and granted life term imprisonment in August 2025.
