= Jagat Farm market =

Jagat Farm Marketplace
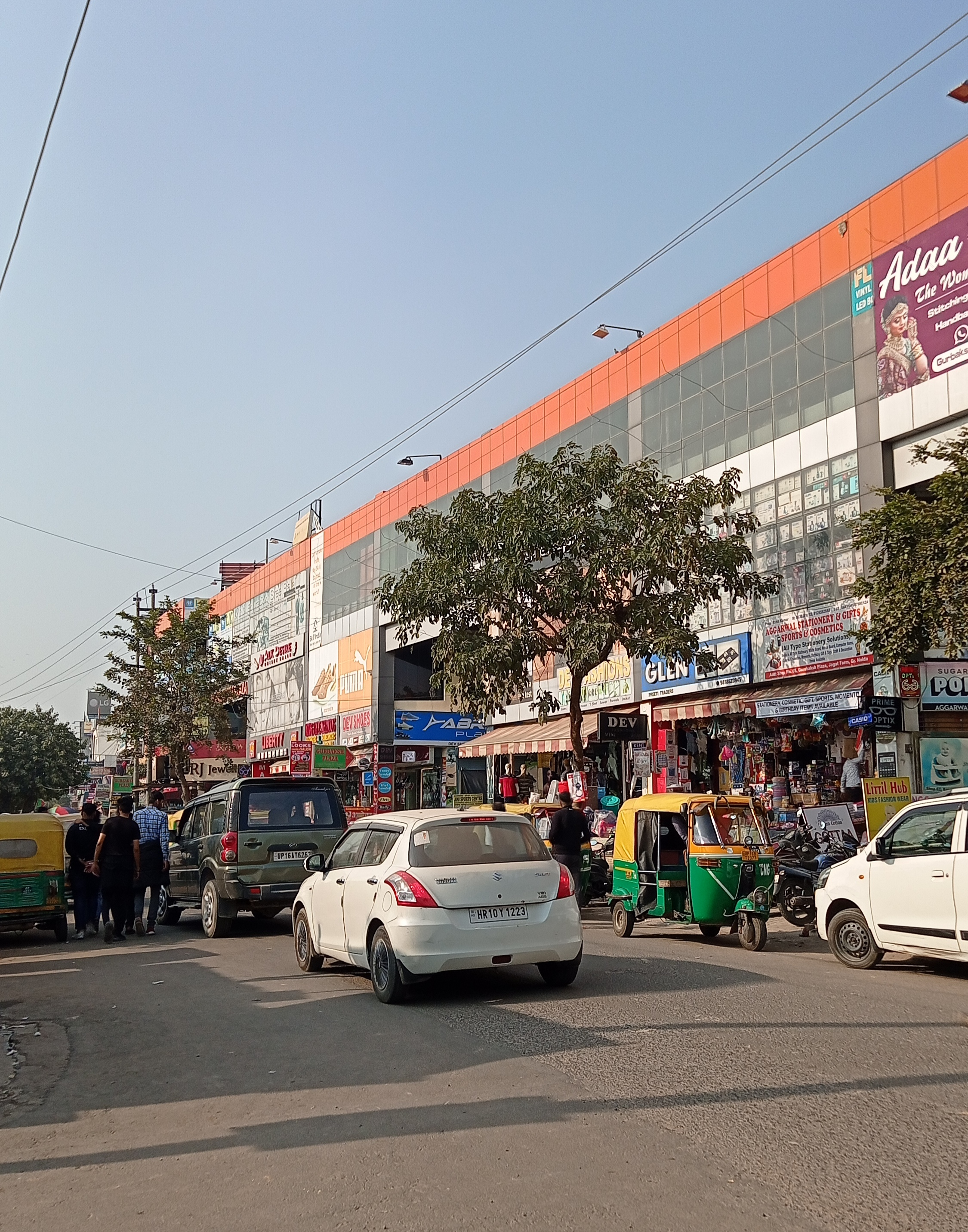
- Jagat Farm market, Feb. 2022

- Location in Uttar Pradesh, India
- Coordinates: 28°28′51″N 77°29′57″E
- Country: India
- State: Uttar Pradesh
- District: Gautam Buddha Nagar

Government
  - Body: Greater Noida Industrial Development Authority

Languages
  - Official: Hindi, English
- Time zone: UTC+5:30 (IST)
- PIN: 201308

Jagat Farm is a marketplace in southmost Gamma I, Greater Noida, Uttar Pradesh, India, Bordered by Surajpur-Kansa road to the west and Beta I to the south, it is one of the busiest marketplaces in Greater Noida. this market place consist of big franchises like Burger King, Dominos, Apple store, Hp Store, Lenovo Store with a lot of local stores for street food, clothes, footwear and many more. Jagat Farm Market is one of the best market place in Gr Noida. Nearest Metro Station is Alpha 1. that serves several shopping plazas It is also one of the top destinations for African-origin students in the city.
