= Knowledge Park II, Greater Noida =

Educational region in Greater Noida, Uttar Pradesh, India

Knowledge Park II नॉलेज पार्क 2
- Commercial district

- Location within Uttar Pradesh
- Coordinates: 28°27′26″N 77°29′50″E
- Country: India
- Region: North India
- State: Uttar Pradesh
- City: Greater Noida

Government
  - Body: Greater Noida Industrial Development Authority

Languages
  - Official: Hindi, English
- Time zone: UTC+5:30 (IST)
- PIN: 201310

Knowledge Park II or Knowledge Park 2 (Hindi: नॉलेज पार्क 2) is sector in south-western Greater Noida, Uttar Pradesh, India. Bordered by Knowledge Park I to the east, Knowledge Park III to the north and Sector 150, Noida to the west, it serves the Knowledge Park II metro station alongside numerous private and public institutes, including Galgotias College, Greater Noida Institute of Technology (GNIOT) and Mangalmay Institute of Engineering and Technology.
