= Knowledge Park III, Greater Noida =

Educational region in Greater Noida, Uttar Pradesh, India

Knowledge Park III नॉलेज पार्क 3
- Commercial district
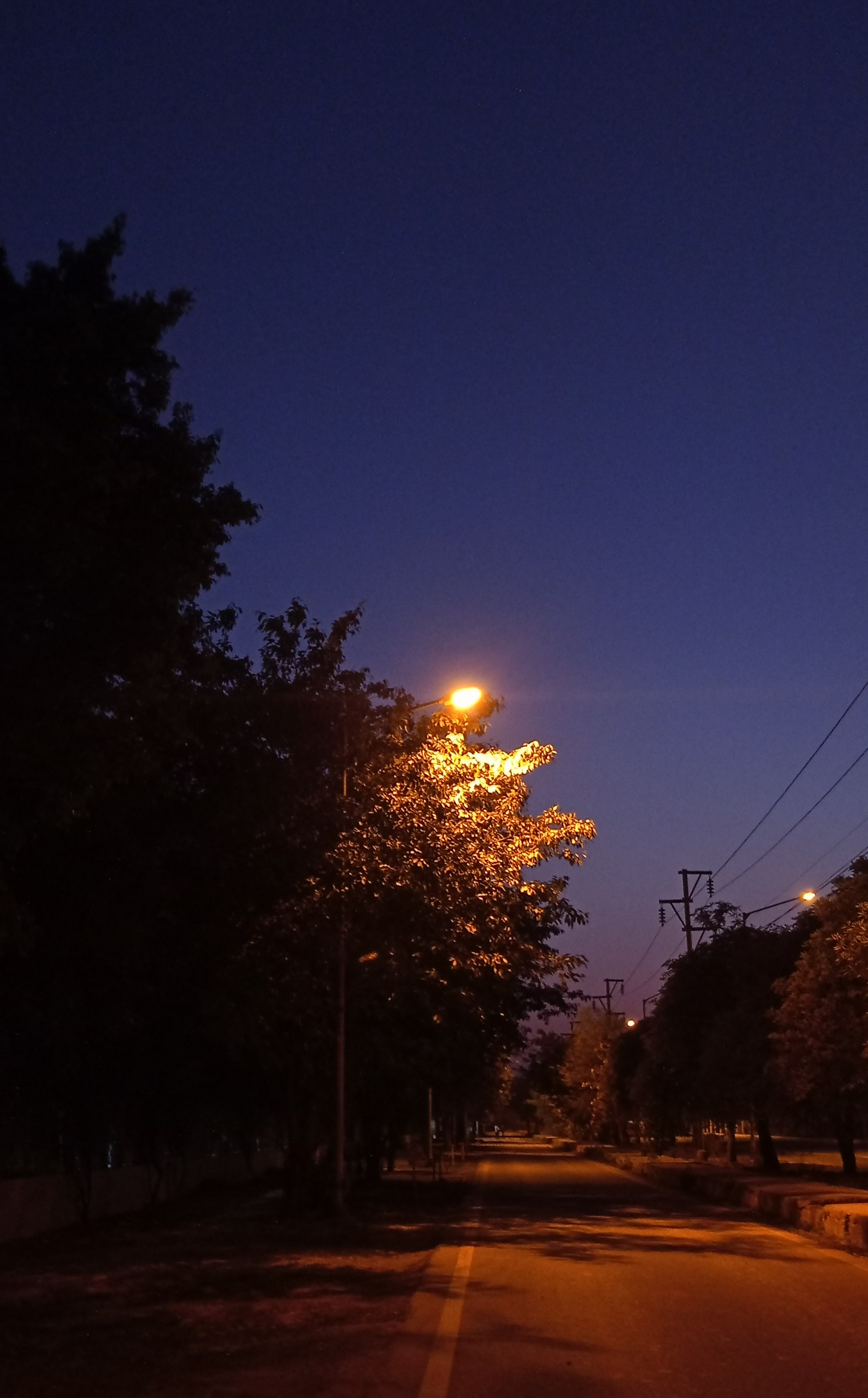
- A street light near Delhi Technical Campus in Knowledge Park III, Greater Noida

- Location within Uttar Pradesh
- Coordinates: 28°28′21″N 77°29′20″E
- Country: India
- Region: North India
- State: Uttar Pradesh
- City: Greater Noida

Government
  - Body: Greater Noida Industrial Development Authority

Languages
  - Official: Hindi, English
- Time zone: UTC+5:30 (IST)
- PIN: 201306-10

Knowledge Park III or Knowledge Park 3 (Hindi: नॉलेज पार्क 3) is a sector in south-western Greater Noida, Uttar Pradesh, India. Bordered by Knowledge Park II to the south and Gamma I to the east, it serves numerous private and public institutes, including G.L Bajaj Institute Of Technology and management, Sharda University, Delhi Technical Campus, Dronacharya Group of Institutions and Amity University alongside several skill development training centres.
