= Aqua Line (Noida Metro) =

Line of the Noida Metro system

Noida Metro Aqua Line

Overview
- Status: Operational
- Owner: Noida Metro Rail Corporation
- Locale: Noida, Greater Noida
- Termini: Noida Sector 51; Depot
- Stations: 21

Service
- Type: Rapid transit
- System: Noida Metro
- Operator: Delhi Metro Rail Corporation
- Rolling stock: CRRC Nanjing Puzhen
- Daily ridership: NA

History
- Opened: 25 January 2019; 7 years ago

Technical
- Line length: 29.7 kilometers (18.5 mi)
- Character: Elevated
- Track gauge: 1,435 mm (4 ft 8 1/2 in) standard gauge
- Electrification: 25 kV 50 Hz AC overhead catenary

The Aqua Line is a line of Noida Metro, a rapid transit system in Noida and Greater Noida in Uttar Pradesh, India. It consists of 21 metro stations from Sector 51 in Noida to Depot in Greater Noida.

The line has been operational since 25 January 2019. It was inaugurated by the Chief Minister of Uttar Pradesh, Yogi Adityanath.

== Stations ==
All 21 stations on the 29.7 kilometres (18.5 mi) Aqua Line route are on elevated track. This line has an interchange station with the Delhi Metro at Noida Sector 52 metro station. All stations are equipped with platform screen doors.

Aqua Line
#	Station name		Phase	Opening	Interchange Connection	Station Layout	Platform Level Type	Depot Connection	Depot Layout
#	English	Hindi	Phase	Opening	Interchange Connection	Station Layout	Platform Level Type	Depot Connection	Depot Layout
1	Greater Noida West Sector 4	ग्रेटर नोएडा वेस्ट सेक्टर 4	2	2030	None	Elevated	Side	None	
2	Noida Sector 123	नोएडा सेक्टर 123	2	2030	None	Elevated	Side	None	
3	Noida Sector 122	नोएडा सेक्टर 122	2	2030	None	Elevated	Side	None	
4	Noida Sector 70	नोएडा सेक्टर 70	2	2030	None	Elevated	Side	None	
5	Noida Sector 51	नोएडा सेक्टर 51	1	25 January 2019	Blue Line	Elevated	Side	None	
6	Noida Sector 50	नोएडा सेक्टर 50	1	25 January 2019	None	Elevated	Side	None	
7	Noida Sector 76	नोएडा सेक्टर 76	1	25 January 2019	None	Elevated	Side	None	
8	Noida Sector 101	नोएडा सेक्टर 101	1	25 January 2019	None	Elevated	Side	None	
9	Noida Sector 81	नोएडा सेक्टर 81	1	25 January 2019	None	Elevated	Side	None	
10	NSEZ	एन॰एस॰ई॰ज़ेड॰	1	25 January 2019	None	Elevated	Side	None	
11	Noida Sector 83	नोएडा सेक्टर 83	1	25 January 2019	None	Elevated	Side	None	
12	Noida Sector 137	नोएडा सेक्टर 137	1	25 January 2019	None	Elevated	Side	None	
13	Noida Sector 142	नोएडा सेक्टर 142	1	25 January 2019	None	Elevated	Side	None	
14	Noida Sector 143	नोएडा सेक्टर 143	1	25 January 2019	None	Elevated	Side	None	
15	Noida Sector 144	नोएडा सेक्टर 144	1	25 January 2019	None	Elevated	Side	None	
16	Noida Sector 145	नोएडा सेक्टर 145	1	25 January 2019	None	Elevated	Side	None	
17	Noida Sector 146	नोएडा सेक्टर 146	1	25 January 2019	None	Elevated	Side	None	
18	Noida Sector 147	नोएडा सेक्टर 147	1	25 January 2019	None	Elevated	Side	None	
19	Noida Sector 148	नोएडा सेक्टर 148	1	25 January 2019	None	Elevated	Side	None	
20	Knowledge Park II	नॉलेज पार्क II	1	25 January 2019	None	Elevated	Side	None	
21	Pari Chowk	परी चौक	1	25 January 2019	None	Elevated	Side	None	
22	ALPHA 1	अल्फा 1	1	25 January 2019	None	Elevated	Side	None	
23	DELTA 1	डेल्टा 1	1	25 January 2019	None	Elevated	Side	None	
24	GNIDA Office	ग्रेनो ऑफिस	1	25 January 2019	None	Elevated	Side	None	
25	Depot Station	डिपो स्टेशन	1	25 January 2019	None	Elevated	Side	Depot Station	At Grade

== Construction ==
The NMRC has divided the Civil Construction work of Aqua Line (21 stations and 1 Depots) into multiple packages. The list of all construction contract is as follows:

Package	Stations	Contractor
NC-01	Noida Sector-51 to Noida Sector-137 (8 stations)	CEC and Sam India Buitwell (JV)
NC-02	Noida Sector-142 to Noida Sector-148 (7 stations)	CEC and Sam India Buitwell (JV)
NC-03	Knowledge Park II to Depot (6 stations)	CEC and Sam India Buitwell (JV)
NC-04	Greater Noida Depot (1 Depot)	Anupam Constructions
NGNC-01	Noida Sector-122 to Gr. Noida Sector-2 (5 stations)	GR Infraprojects

Note: The construction work of Package NGNC-01 started by 2023 end.

== Future extensions ==
- Noida Aqua Line: Sector 51 - Knowledge Park-V extension.

== See also ==
- List of Noida Metro stations
- Delhi Metro
- Blue Line (Delhi Metro)
