= National Highway 334D (India) =

National Highway in India

National Highway 334D

Route information
- Auxiliary route of NH 34
- Length: 83 km (52 mi)

Major junctions
- East end: Aligarh
- West end: Palwal

Location
- Country: India
- States: Uttar Pradesh, Haryana

Highway system
- Roads in India; Expressways; National; State; Asian
← NH 34	→ NH 44

National Highway 334D, commonly referred to as NH 334D is a national highway in India. It is a secondary route of National Highway 34. NH-334D runs in the states of Uttar Pradesh and Haryana in India.

== Route ==
NH334D connects Aligarh, Khair, Jewar and Palwal in the states of Uttar Pradesh and Haryana. 66 Kms. of this highway lies in Uttar Pradesh and 17 Kms. lies in Haryana.

== Junctions ==
NH 34 Terminal at Khereshwar Chauraha at Aligarh.
Junction with Yamuna Expressway via interchange near Tappal
Junction with Eastern Peripheral Expressway via interchange east of Palwal
NH 44 Terminal at Palwal.

== Tollplaza ==
The only tollplaza will be at Rajapur village near Khair after the upgrade to expressway is completed.

== Upgrade ==
This (NH334D), 72 km existing NH334D is upgraded by the CDS Infrastructure on behalf of NHAI at the cost of INR2,300 cr to the tolled 4-lane Aligarh–Palwal Expressway with 46 km new greenfield bypass alignment including 32 km long Andla-Khair-Jattari greenfield diversion, requiring acquisition of 228 ha land of 43 villages of which land of 100 ha or 18 villages has already been acquired and construction will commence in first week of March 2025 (Feb 2025 update).

== See also ==
- Expressways in UP
- List of national highways in India
- List of national highways in India by state
