= Knowledge Park I, Greater Noida =

Educational region in Greater Noida, Uttar Pradesh, India

Knowledge Park I नॉलेज पार्क 1
- Commercial district
- Location within Uttar Pradesh
- Coordinates: 28°28′59″N 77°29′42″E
- Country: India
- Region: North India
- State: Uttar Pradesh
- City: Greater Noida

Government
  - Body: Greater Noida Industrial Development Authority

Languages
  - Official: Hindi, English
- Time zone: UTC+5:30 (IST)
- PIN: 201310

Knowledge Park I or Knowledge Park 1 (Hindi: नॉलेज पार्क 1) is a sector in south-western Greater Noida, Uttar Pradesh, India. Bordered by Knowledge Park II to the west and Omega II to the south, it serves the Pari Chowk metro station alongside several universities and colleges, including Ram-Eesh Group of Institutions, the National Institute of Management and Technology and Harlal Institute of Management and Technology.
