= Yamuna Expressway =

Indian expressway connecting Greater Noida and Agra

- Yamuna Expressway in red
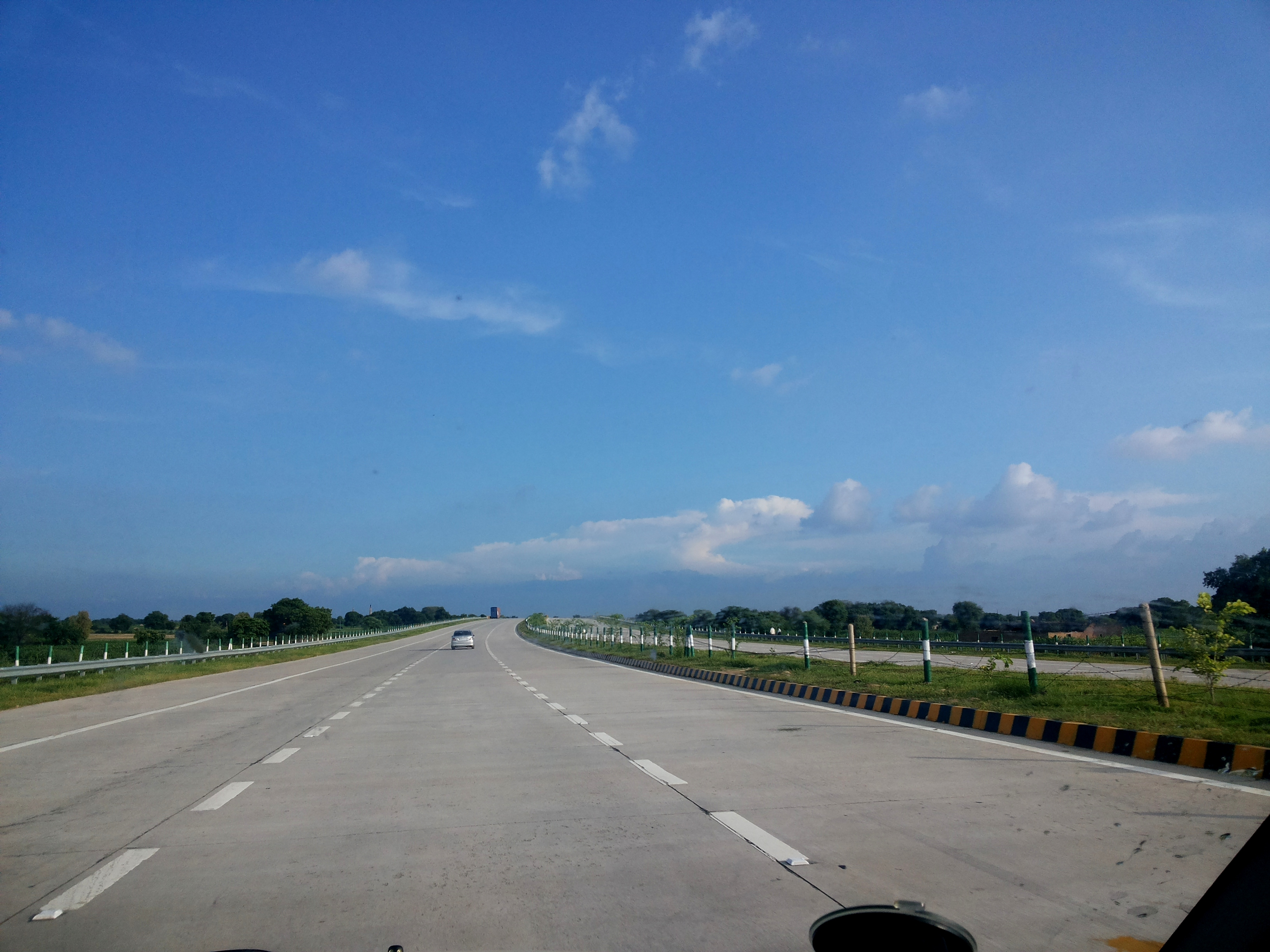
- Yamuna Expressway near Jewar

Route information
- Maintained by Jaypee Infratech Ltd for Yamuna Expressway Industrial Development Authority (YEIDA) until 2048
- Length: 165.537 km (102.860 mi)
- Existed: 9 August 2012–present

Major junctions
- North end: Pari Chowk, Greater Noida
- List: NH 334DD in Jewar; NH 334D in Tappal; NH 530B in Mathura; NH 509 in Khandauli
- South end: NH 19 in Kuberpur, Agra

Location
- Country: India
- States: Uttar Pradesh
- Major cities: Greater Noida, Jewar, Vrindavan, Hathras, Mathura and Agra

Highway system
- Roads in India; Expressways; National; State; Asian

Yamuna Expressway is a 6-lane (expandable to 8), 165.5 km (102.8 mi) long access-controlled expressway in the Indian state of Uttar Pradesh. It is presently India's sixth longest expressway and connects Greater Noida with Agra. It was built to de-congest the older Delhi–Agra national highway (NH-2) or Mathura Road. The Noida-Greater Noida Expressway feeds into the project.

Built by Jaypee Infratech Ltd (JIL) on a BOT (Build-Operate-Transfer) basis, the company has the rights to collect for a period of 36 years, starting from its Commercial Operations Date (COD) on August 9, 2012 until the agreement expires, after which the expressway will be transferred to the Yamuna Expressway Industrial Development Authority (YEIDA). The Yamuna Expressway Industrial Development Authority (YEIDA) region is being developed over an area of approximately 25,000 hectares along the Yamuna Expressway in the state of Uttar Pradesh. The region includes the Noida International Airport at Jewar which is under development and is planned to be one of the largest airports in India.

The Noida International Airport located in Jewar of the Gautam Buddha Nagar District also lies on the side of the expressway, with it acting as the main connection to multiple cities.

The expressway saw an investment ₹12,839 crore (US$1.3 billion) and was inaugurated on 9 August 2012 by then Chief Minister of UP Akhilesh Yadav. A total of 13 service roads of about 168 km were built for local commuters to access the expressway.

== History ==
After years of delays, construction was completed in May 2012, and the expressway was formally inaugurated on 9 August 2012, about two years behind its original target completion date.

== Yamuna Emergency Landing Field ==
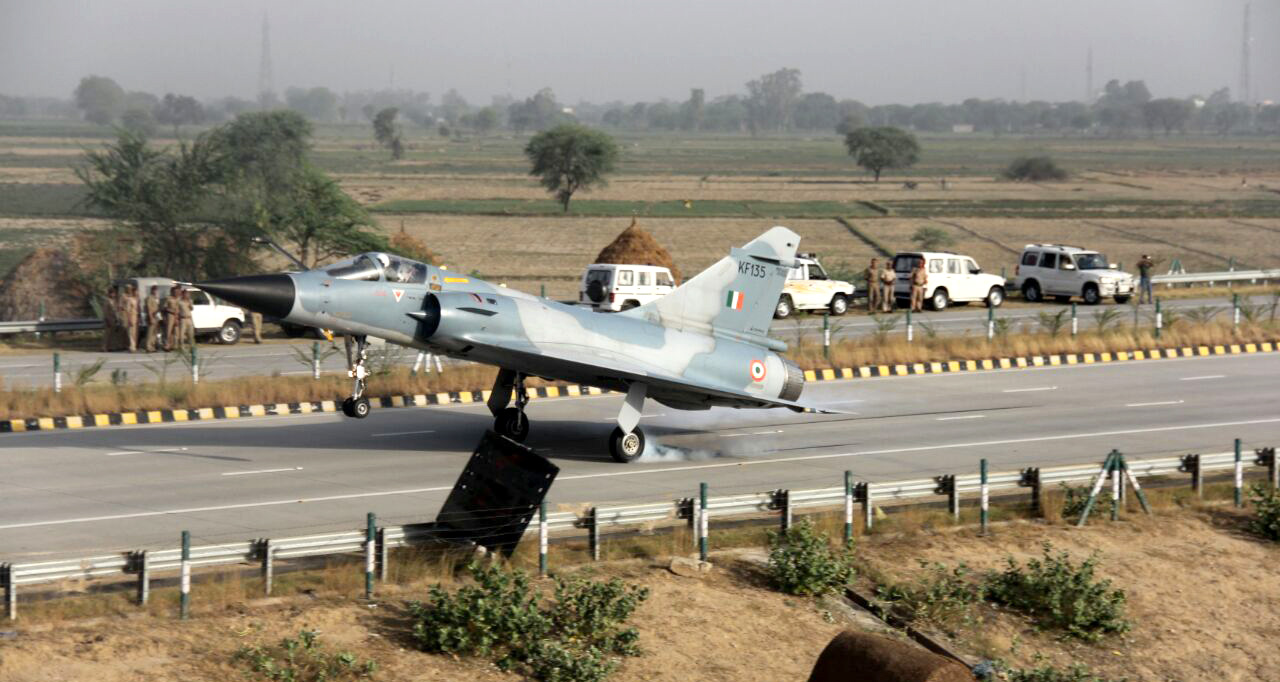
IAF Mirage 2000 landing on the Yamuna Expressway

In a first for military aviation in India, the Indian Air Force on 21 May 2015 successfully landed a French Dassault Mirage 2000 on the Yamuna Expressway near Raya village, Mathura. The mock drill was a practice run to evaluate the utility of highways for emergency landings by military aircraft.

== Characteristics ==
The Yamuna Expressway has SOS booths along the route besides a toll-free helpline. CCTV cameras are installed every 5 km (3.1 mi) along the expressway. There are mobile radars to monitor compliance with minimum and maximum speed limits; and one highway patrol every 25 km (16 mi). The Expressway is expected to be used by over 100,000 vehicles every day, and reduce travel times between Greater Noida and Agra from four hours to one hour 40 minutes. There is a patrol station at Tappal, the halfway point on the expressway. Tappal 60 km (37 mi) from Noida Sec. 37 i.e. botanical garden. In 2025, the Yamuna Expressway successfully implemented all road safety measures recommended by an expert team from IIT Delhi.

=== Metro Rail connectivity ===
Metro rail service from Pari Chowk to Yamuna Expressway Sector 18 and 20 will be added in the future, according to officials.

== Development ==
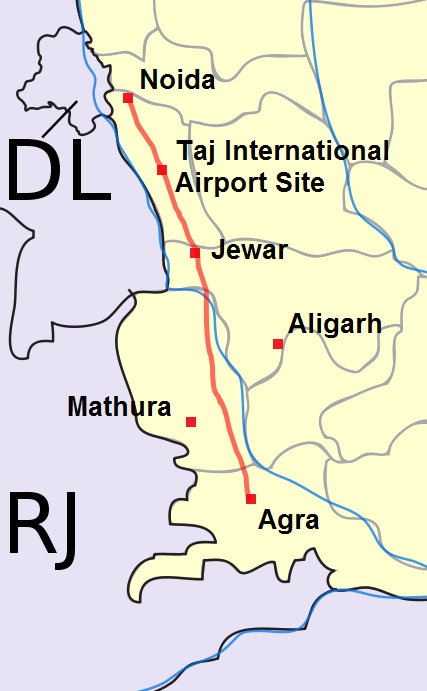
Yamuna Expressway within the state of Uttar Pradesh

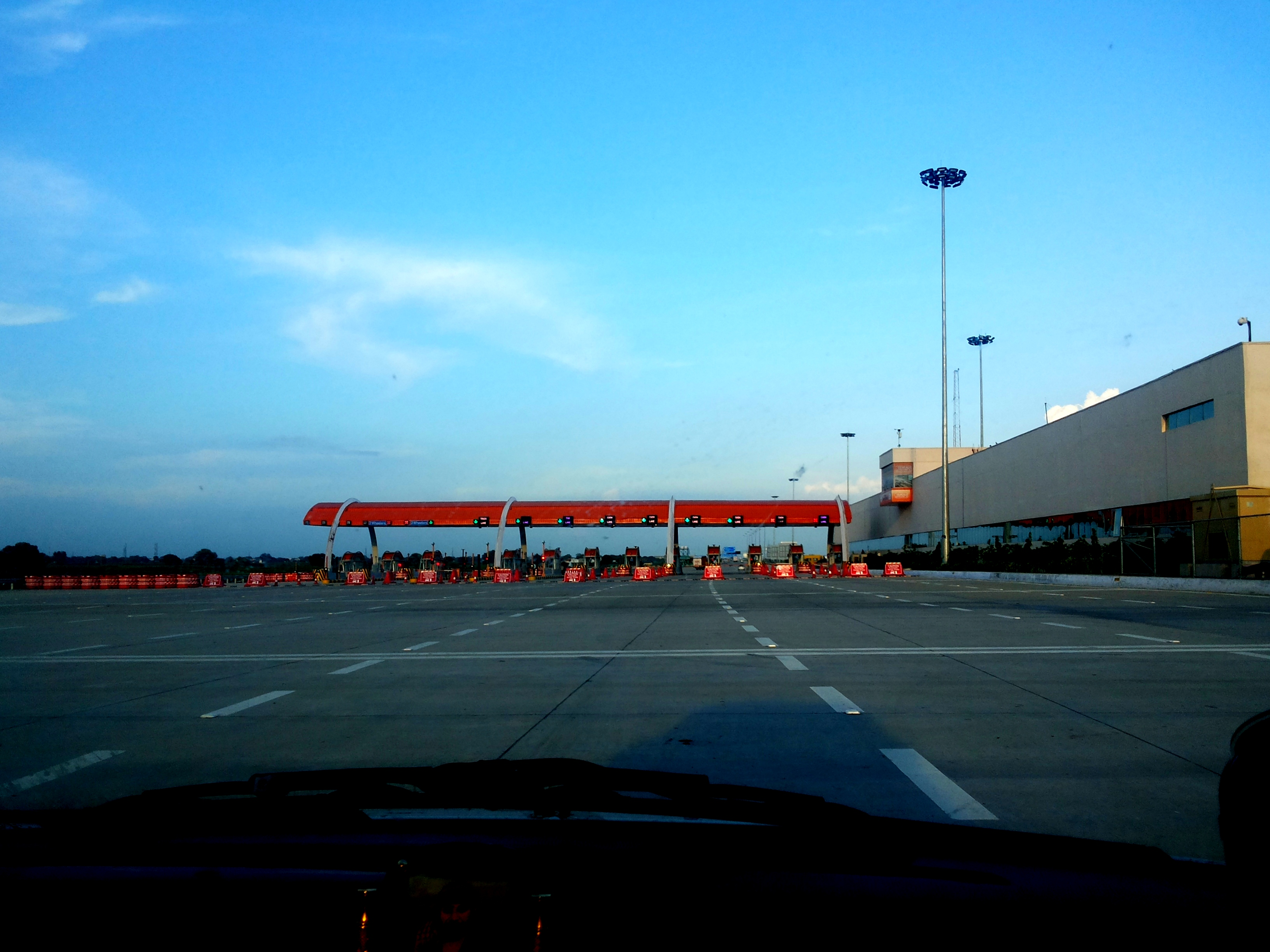
A toll plaza on Yamuna Expressway

The Expressway was developed by Yamuna Expressway Industrial Development Authority (YEIDA) in 3 phases and the contract was awarded to Jaypee Infratech Limited:

- Phase I: Expressway Stretch between Greater Noida & proposed Taj International Aviation Hub (near village Jewar on the southern tip of Dist. Gautam Budh Nagar).
- Phase II: Expressway Stretch between proposed Taj International Aviation Hub and an intermediate destination between proposed Taj International Aviation Hub & Agra.
- Phase III: Expressway Stretch between intermediate destination & Agra.

Speed Limit The speed limit on the expressway is 100 km/h (62 mph) for vehicles. The right most lane on the expressway is reserved for overtaking only. Heavy vehicles are limited to a maximum speed of 60 kilometers per hour.

Upcoming Residential Project Yamuna Expressway has become preferred for builders and developers. Many builders are bringing residential projects to Yamuna Expressway. To inject new life into the real estate market, Yamuna Expressway Industrial Development Authority has come up with affordable housing projects. Under the new subvention scheme YEIDA has launched 200 small ticket size apartments and 80 large size residential flats.

Agra–Lucknow connectivity A 302 km (188 mi) Agra–Lucknow Expressway Project is completed with estimated budget of ₹ 15,000 crore extends YEA to Lucknow enabling fast transit. Agra–Lucknow Expressway will extend to the proposed Sanjay Khan project of a theme park of seven cities. Yamuna Expressway linked to Agra-Lucknow Expressway through Agra Inner Ring Road Expressway 11.9 km (7.39 mi) which also shortens the distance and avoid the heavy traffic of Agra, tourists can directly reach Taj Mahal. In March 2025, the Indian government approved the project to connect the Yamuna Expressway with the Delhi-Agra Highway.

== Goals ==
The goals of the expressway are as follows:

1. To establish a high-speed corridor for efficient travel time reduction.
2. To link key built-up area and commercial zones situated on the eastern side of the Yamuna River.
3. To foster development in the surrounding areas.
4. To alleviate traffic congestion on NH-2, which passes through densely populated cities like Faridabad, Ballabgarh, and Palwal.
5. To, combined with NH-2 and NH-91, create an extensive road network, promoting comprehensive development.
6. Facilitate swift transportation of essential supplies and aid to affected regions during emergencies such as flooding along the Yamuna River.

== Features ==
The Yamuna Expressway is one of India's lengthiest access-controlled concrete expressway.

Emergency medical services, including ambulances and hospital tie-ups, are available for accidents and medical emergencies.

The expressway is equipped with closed-circuit television surveillance, which is used to monitor vehicle's speeds.

Authorities plan to install fuelling stations, food courts, ATMs, and public restrooms along the expressway.

== Toll rates ==
Tolls are charged at three points along the expressway. Cars are charged ₹2.65 /km (1.65 /mi) and mini-buses ₹3.85 /km (2.39 /mi). Buses and Trucks are charged ₹7.85 /km (4.88 /mi). Heavy vehicles are charged ₹11.94 /km (7.419 /mi).

There are 16 toll plazas on each side of the expressway.

== Status updates ==
- Apr 2001: A 6-lane wide expressway is conceived between Greater Noida and Agra by the then Chief Minister of Uttar Pradesh (Oct 2000-Mar 2002) Rajnath Singh. Taj Expressway Authority (TEA), a statutory body constituted on 20 April 2001.
- Feb 2003: Concession Agreement between TEA and Jaypee Infratech Ltd (Jaypee Group) as the concessionaire was executed on 7 February 2003.
- Sep 2007: Land acquisition began by the Government of UP, led by the then Chief Minister (May 2007-Mar 2012) Mayawati.
- Jan 2008: Construction work started by Jaypee Infratech Ltd.
- July 2008: Taj Expressway renamed as Yamuna Expressway with effect from 11 July 2008.
- May 2011: Protest started by farmers of Bhatta and Parsaul villages near Dankaur in Gautam Buddha Nagar district.
- Aug 2012: Yamuna Expressway is inaugurated by the then Chief Minister of Uttar Pradesh (Mar 2012-Mar 2017), Akhilesh Yadav on 9 August 2012.
- Jun 2021: Electronic toll collection has been started on 15 June 2021 by using FASTag RFID on vehicles.

== See also ==
- Circular roads around Delhi: Ring, Regional and Zonal Highways
  - Inner Ring Road, Delhi
  - Outer Ring Road, Delhi
  - Urban Extension Road-II
  - Eastern Peripheral Expressway (KGP Expressway)
  - Western Peripheral Expressway (KMP Expressway)
- Expressways of India
  - Expressways in Haryana
    - DND–KMP Expressway
    - Delhi–Amritsar–Katra Expressway
  - Expressways in Uttar Pradesh
    - Agra–Lucknow Expressway
    - Buddh International Circuit
    - Delhi–Meerut Expressway
    - Delhi Noida Direct Flyway (DND Flyway)
  - Other
    - Najafgarh Drain Highway
