= Noida–Greater Noida Expressway =

Road in India

- Noida–Greater Noida Expressway in red
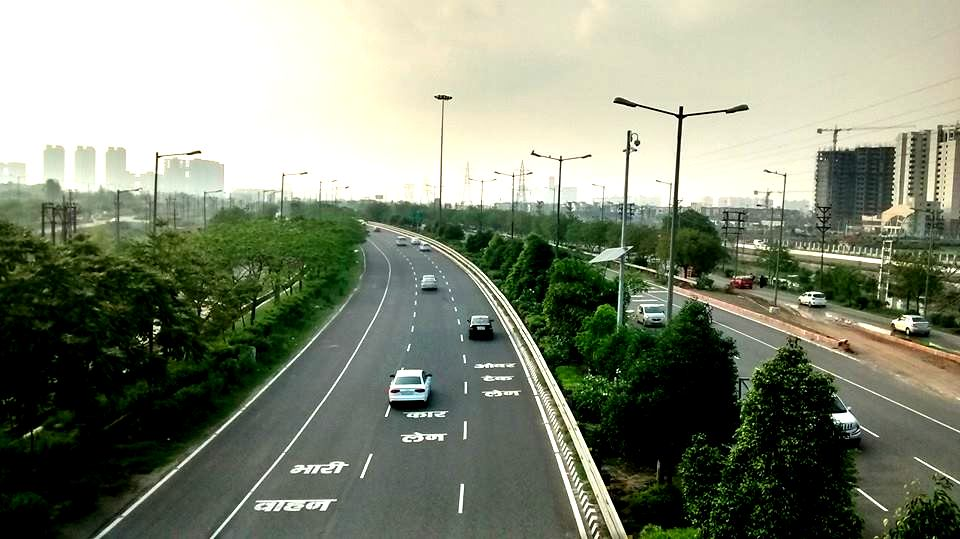

Route information
- Length: 24.53 km (15.24 mi)

Major junctions
- From: Mahamaya flyover, Noida
- To: Pari Chowk, Greater Noida

Location
- Country: India
- States: Uttar Pradesh

Highway system
- Roads in India; Expressways; National; State; Asian

The Noida–Greater Noida Expressway or NGN Expressway is a six-lane expressway connecting Noida, Uttar Pradesh, an industrial suburb of Delhi to Greater Noida, a new suburb adjacent to Noida. This expressway is under expansion to Taj Economic Zone, International Airport and Aviation Hub proposed to be constructed along the Yamuna Expressway (Taj Expressway). The expressway is 24.53 km (15.24 mi) long, built at a cost of ₹400 Crore to relieve the old Delhi-Agra national highway (NH-2) which was already congested and ran through the heart of cities like Faridabad, Ballabhgarh and Palwal.

== Inter-connectivity ==
The following will either connect with or provide an alternate route to the Noida-Greater Noida Expressway:

- Noida-Greater Noida Bundh Expressway (NGNBE): nearly 25 km long, INR 400 crore, 6-lane expressway between Yamuna river and existing Noida-Greater Noida Expressway will run over the bundh (flood prevention embankment) from Noida Sector-94 (near southeast corner of Okhla bird sanctuary) to Noida Sector-168. Near sector 94, it will start from the existing Noida-Greater Noida Expressway, then along the way near Gulavali & sector 160 will interchange with Gulavali-LG Chowk road, and end near sector 168 at Faridabad–Noida–Ghaziabad Expressway (FNG).

== See also ==
- Eastern Peripheral Expressway
- Western Peripheral Expressway
- Highways in Haryana
- Haryana Orbital Rail Corridor (HORC)
