= Noida Sector 51 metro station =

Noida Metro station

Noida Sector 51

General information
- Location: Block E, Sector 51, Noida, Uttar Pradesh 201301
- Coordinates: 28.5857°N 77.3753°E
- System: Noida Metro station
- Owner: Noida Metro
- Operator: Noida Metro Rail Corporation (NMRC)
- Line: Aqua Line
- Platforms: Side Platform; Platform-1 → Train terminates Platform-2 → Depot
- Tracks: 2
- Connections: Blue Line Noida Sector 52

Construction
- Structure type: Elevated, Double-track
- Platform levels: 2
- Accessible: Yes

Other information
- Website: http://nmrcnoida.com

History
- Opened: 25 January 2019; 7 years ago
- Electrified: 25 kV 50 Hz AC through overhead catenary

Services
Preceding station	Noida Metro	Following station
Terminus	Aqua Line	Rainbow towards Depot Station
Out-of-system interchange
Preceding station	Delhi Metro	Following station
Noida Sector 61 towards Noida Electronic City	Blue Line transfer at Noida Sector 52	Noida Sector 34 towards Dwarka Sector 21
Route map
Location
- Location within Delhi Location within Uttar Pradesh

The Noida Sector 51 is the elevated northern terminal metro station on the north–south corridor of the Aqua Line of Noida Metro in the city of Noida, Uttar Pradesh. It was opened to the public on 25 January 2019.

The station is connected to the Noida Sector 52 metro station on the Delhi Metro's Blue Line by a 300-metre-long pedestrian walkway. An overhead walkway connecting the two stations will be built by IKEA as part of an agreement signed between the company and the Noida Authority in February 2021. However, IKEA later stated that it would require at least 6 years to open its new showroom in Noida and the adjoining skywalk. In March 2022, the Noida Authority stated that it had floated tenders to construct a 420 metre long and five metre wide, L-shaped, foot overbridge connecting the two stations.

== Station layout ==
G	Street level	Exit/Entrance
L1	Mezzanine	Fare control, station agent, Metro Card vending machines, crossover
L2	Side platform | Doors will open on the left
L2	Platform 2 Southbound	Towards → Depot; Next Station: Rainbow
L2	Platform 1 Northbound	Towards ← Train Terminates Here
L2	Side platform | Doors will open on the left
L2
