= Depot Station metro station (Noida) =

Metro station in Greater Noida, India

Depot Station

General information
- Location: Sector 34, Greater Noida, Uttar Pradesh, 201310, India.
- Coordinates: 28.488962°N 77.543994°E
- System: Noida-Greater Noida Metro station
- Owner: Noida Metro Rail Corporation (NMRC)
- Line: Aqua Line
- Platforms: Side platform Platform-1 → Noida Sector 51 (Operational during peak hours); Platform-2 → Noida Sector 51; Platform-3 → Train Terminates Here

Construction
- Structure type: Elevated

Other information
- Website: http://nmrcnoida.com

History
- Opened: 25 January 2019; 7 years ago

Services
Preceding station	Noida Metro	Following station
GNIDA Office towards Noida Sector 51	Aqua Line	Terminus
Route map
Location

The Depot Station is the elevated southern terminal metro station on the North-South corridor of the Aqua Line of Noida Metro in the city of Greater Noida, Uttar Pradesh. It was opened on 25 January 2019.

== Station layout ==
G	Street Level	Exit/ Entrance
L1	Mezzanine	Fare control, station agent, Metro Card vending machines, crossover
L2	Side platform | Doors will open on the left
L2	Platform 3 Southbound	Towards → Train Terminates Here
L2	Platform 2 Northbound	Towards ← Noida Sector 51; Next Station: GNIDA Office
L2	Island platform | P2 Doors will open on the left | P1 Doors will open on the right
L2	Platform 1 Northbound	Towards ← Noida Sector 51 next station is GNIDA Office(No service / Operational during peak hours)
L2
