= Noida Metro =

Indian rapid transit system

Overview
- Owner: Noida Metro Rail Corporation
- Area served: Noida and Greater Noida
- Transit type: Rapid Transit
- Number of lines: 1
- Line number: Aqua Line
- Number of stations: 21
- Daily ridership: 61,400 (2025)
- Chief executive: Jaideep (Chairman); Krishna Karunesh, IAS (Managing Director)
- Headquarters: Block-III, Ganga Shopping Complex, Sector-29, Noida, Uttar Pradesh
- Website: www.nmrcnoida.com

Operation
- Began operation: 25 January 2019; 7 years ago
- Operator: Noida Metro Rail Corporation
- Character: Elevated
- Train length: 4 coaches
- Headway: 10-15 minutes

Technical
- System length: 29.7 km (18.5 mi)
- Track gauge: 1,435 mm (4 ft 8 1/2 in) standard gauge
- Electrification: 25 kV 50 Hz AC overhead catenary
- Top speed: 80 km/h (50 mph)

Noida Metro Map

The Noida Metro is a rapid transit system serving the twin cities of Noida and Greater Noida in Uttar Pradesh, India. The metro network consists of one line (Aqua Line), with a total length of 29.7 kilometres (18.5 mi) serving 21 stations, all of them elevated. The system uses standard-gauge tracks. It is the 11th metro system to be built in India and second in Uttar Pradesh after Lucknow Metro. It is the tenth longest operational metro network in India.

The services are available from 6:00am to 11:25pm from Monday to Saturday. On Sundays, trains are available between 8:00am and 11:25pm. The trains make 163 trips a day on weekdays, using a fleet of 10 trains and the frequency is 10 minutes during peak hours (8:00am–11:00am and 5:00pm–8:00pm) and 15 minutes during off-peak hours. On Saturday and Sunday the frequency is 10 minutes. Initially, the trains are composed of four cars to be extended up to six in the future.

Noida Metro Rail Corporation (NMRC), a state-owned corporation, built and owns the system. However, the operations and maintenance of Noida Metro lies with Delhi Metro Rail Corporation. The line is connected to Delhi Metro's Noida Sector 52 metro station at Noida Sector 51 station by a skywalk. Foundation for the NMRC project was laid down in October 2014, with the construction being commenced by the end of December 2014 by then Chief Minister of Uttar Pradesh Akhilesh Yadav. Trial runs started in August 2018, and the metro was inaugurated on 25 January 2019 by Chief Minister of Uttar Pradesh, Yogi Adityanath. It is planned to be connected with the proposed Jewar Airport through an extension of the Aqua Line.

== History ==
The Uttar Pradesh government approved the construction of a 29.7 km (18.5 mi) metro line, linking Noida with Greater Noida in October 2014. The government also appointed the Delhi Metro Rail Corporation (DMRC) as the turnkey consultant for the project.

The detailed project report (DPR) was prepared by the DMRC. A Special Purpose Vehicle (SPV) called the Noida Metro Rail Corporation (NMRC) was formed to implement the project. The Uttar Pradesh Cabinet approved the project and forwarded the DPR to Government of India in October 2013. The Government of India and UP will each bear 20% of the costs and loans from external agencies would be taken to fund the rest 60% of the project. Twenty percent funding from UP will be shared by Noida and Greater Noida Authorities, based on the length of track that passes through the two areas.

The NMRC announced on 30 November 2016 that the first line of the metro would be called the Aqua Line. Explaining the choice, NMRC managing director Santosh Yadav stated, "Aqua signifies an eco-friendly colour, which is what we want to portray." The project received safety clearance from the commissioner of metro rail safety on 21 December 2018.

The Greater Noida Industrial Development Authority (GNIDA) approved an extension of the Aqua Line as part of Phase 2 of the metro project on 4 December 2018. The 15 km extension will link Noida Sector 71 to Knowledge Park 5 in Greater Noida. The extension will consist of nine stations and is expected to cost ₹2,602 crore (US$280 million). The new stations are Sector 122 and Sector 123 in Noida and Sector 4, Ecotech 12, Sectors 2, Sector 3, Sector 10, Sector 12 and Knowledge Park V in Greater Noida.

== Construction Phases ==
=== Phase 1: Noida Sector 51–Depot (Aqua Line) ===
The first phase of the Noida Metro project involved the construction of an approximately 29.7 km elevated corridor connecting Noida Sector 51 with Depot station in Greater Noida, comprising 21 stations. The Government of Uttar Pradesh approved the project in October 2014. The Delhi Metro Rail Corporation (DMRC), which was appointed to execute the project, commenced construction on 25 May 2015.

Construction progressed throughout 2016 and 2017. Approximately 70% of the civil work had been completed by February 2017. By July 2017, around 95% of the civil work on the elevated track and 21 stations had been completed. The elevated viaduct was completed in November 2017 following the installation of the final girder.

The first four metro coaches, manufactured in China, arrived at the Greater Noida depot on 14 December 2017. Initial trial runs began on 2 January 2018 near the Greater Noida depot and were subsequently extended to other sections of the corridor. Testing and safety inspections continued throughout 2018. The Commissioner of Metro Rail Safety conducted the final safety inspection in December 2018, and clearance for commercial operations was reported on 21 December 2018.

The Aqua Line was inaugurated on 25 January 2019 by Uttar Pradesh Chief Minister Yogi Adityanath, with passenger services commencing on 26 January 2019. The total project cost of Phase 1 was estimated to be ₹5,503 crore (equivalent to ₹71 billion or US$760 million in 2026).

Phase 1 network
No.	Line name	Terminals		Stations	Length (km)	Opening date
1	Aqua Line	Noida Sector 51	Depot Station	21	29.7 km (18.5 mi)	25 January 2019
Total				21	29.7 km (18.5 mi)	

=== Phase 2 ===
==== Noida Sector 51–Knowledge Park V extension ====
The proposed extension of the Aqua Line from Noida Sector 51 to Knowledge Park V in Greater Noida West was initially planned as a 14.958 km corridor comprising nine stations, with construction proposed in two stages. The first stage was planned to connect Noida Sector 51 with Greater Noida Sector 2, covering approximately 9.15 km with five stations, while the second stage would extend approximately 5.8 km from Greater Noida Sector 2 to Knowledge Park V, comprising four stations.

The original alignment was subsequently revised to improve connectivity with the Delhi Metro Blue Line. On 5 February 2024, the Noida Metro Rail Corporation (NMRC) approved a revised Detailed Project Report (DPR) prepared by the Delhi Metro Rail Corporation. The revised project comprises a 17.435 km elevated corridor with 11 proposed stations and an estimated completion cost of ₹2,991.60 crore.

The revised alignment includes an interchange at Noida Sector 51 with the Delhi Metro Blue Line. Following approval by the NMRC board, the DPR was submitted to the state and central governments for further consideration.

==== Noida Sector 142–Botanical Garden extension ====
Another extension of the Aqua Line is planned between Noida Sector 142 and Botanical Garden. The proposed corridor is 11.56 km long and comprises eight elevated stations, providing an interchange with the Delhi Metro Blue and Magenta lines at Botanical Garden.

The NMRC board approved the project's Detailed Project Report on 27 December 2023, and the report was submitted to the Government of Uttar Pradesh in January 2024. The Uttar Pradesh Cabinet approved the proposal on 25 June 2024, after which it was to be forwarded to the central government for further approval and funding.

The Union Cabinet approved the corridor in February 2026. A formal sanction order was issued on 17 March 2026, with a completion period of 48 months from the date of sanction.

In August 2026, NMRC selected Larsen & Toubro as the construction contractor for the corridor, along with the Depot–Boraki extension.

==== Depot–Boraki extension ====
The Depot–Boraki extension is a proposed 2.6 km elevated extension of the existing Aqua Line beyond Depot station towards Boraki in Greater Noida. It is planned to comprise two stations and connect the metro network with the proposed Boraki Multi-Modal Transport Hub.

The extension was included in NMRC's consultancy procurement for Aqua Line expansion works in 2026, alongside the Sector 142–Botanical Garden corridor. In August 2026, Larsen & Toubro was selected as the construction contractor for the Depot–Boraki extension together with the Sector 142–Botanical Garden corridor.

Phase 2 network
No.	Line name	Terminals		Stations	Length (km)	Opening date
1	Aqua Line	Knowledge Park V	Noida Sector 51	11	17.43 km (10.83 mi)	2030
2	Aqua Line	Depot Station	Boraki	2	2.6 km (1.6 mi)	2030
3	Aqua Branch Line	Botanical Garden	Noida Sector 142	8	11.56 km (7.18 mi)	2030
Total				21	31.59 km (19.63 mi)	

=== Proposed extensions ===
==== Ballabhgarh–Noida Airport Metro ====
The National Capital Region Transport Corporation (NCRTC) has identified a Delhi–Faridabad–Ballabhgarh–Palwal regional rapid transit corridor among its proposed future projects. Separately, the Government of India approved revised costs for a 31.42 km road corridor connecting the Delhi–Faridabad–Ballabhgarh–Sohna spur of the Delhi–Mumbai Expressway with Noida International Airport in March 2026.

==== Greater Noida–Noida Airport rail corridor ====
Rail connectivity between Greater Noida and Noida International Airport has been proposed as part of the wider regional transport network. The National Capital Region Transport Corporation (NCRTC) prepared a Detailed Project Report (DPR) for a proposed Regional Rapid Transit System (RRTS)-cum-metro corridor connecting Ghaziabad with Noida International Airport via Greater Noida. The approximately 72 km corridor was divided into two sections, from Ghaziabad to Ecotech VI in Greater Noida and from Ecotech VI to Noida International Airport. The proposal includes both regional rapid transit and local metro services.

==== Noida Airport–Sector 21 Amusement Park PRT ====
The Yamuna Expressway Industrial Development Authority (YEIDA) proposed a Personal Rapid Transit (PRT) system, commonly referred to as a pod taxi, to connect Noida International Airport with the proposed amusement park and International Film City in Sector 21 along the Yamuna Expressway.

In February 2022, YEIDA approved the Detailed Project Report for the proposed system, then estimated to cost ₹810 crore. In July 2023, YEIDA invited global tenders for a revised 14.6 km PRT corridor connecting the airport with Sector 21.

== Lines ==
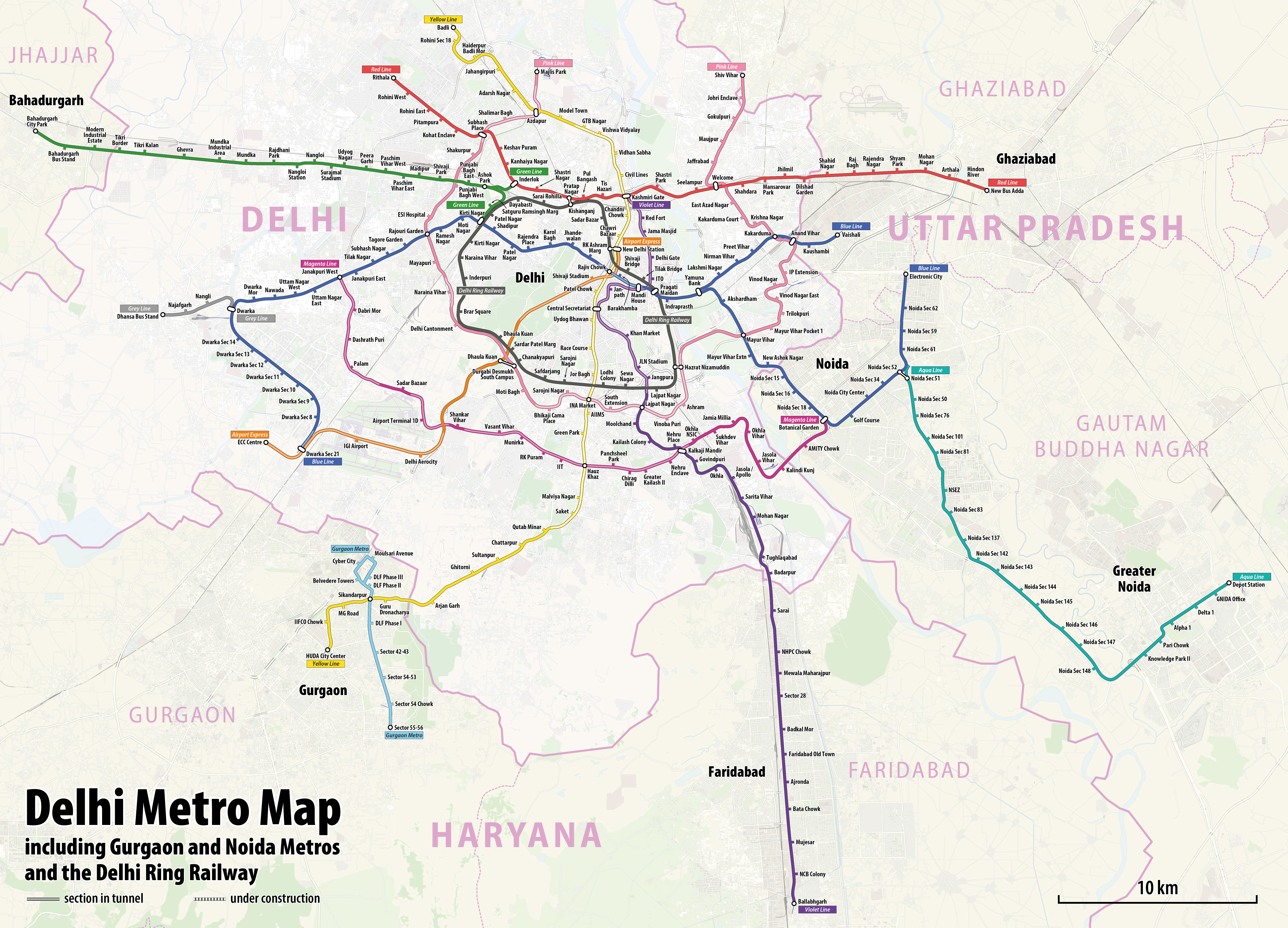
Noida Metro's Aqua Line as part of the Delhi rail network

=== Aqua Line ===
The Noida Metro currently operates one line, known as the Aqua Line, which connects Noida Sector 51 with Depot station in Greater Noida. The line is approximately 29.7 km (18.5 mi) long and consists of 21 elevated stations, including 15 in Noida and six in Greater Noida. It commenced operations on 25 January 2019 and is operated by the Noida Metro Rail Corporation (NMRC).

Several extensions of the Aqua Line have been proposed, including a 17.4 km corridor from Noida Sector 51 to Knowledge Park V, an 11.56 km corridor from Noida Sector 142 to Botanical Garden, and a 2.6 km extension from Depot station to Boraki. The proposed Botanical Garden extension would provide interchange connections with the Blue Line and Magenta Line of the Delhi Metro.

== Network ==
Noida Metro
No.	Line Name	Terminal		Stations	Length	First Operation	Last Extension
1	Aqua Line	Noida Sector 51	Depot Station	21	29.7 km (18.5 mi)	25 January 2019	
Total				21	29.7 km (18.5 mi)		

== Status updates ==
=== Phase 1 ===
Noida Sector 51 to Depot

- Oct 2014: UP Government approves the metro project.
- Sep 2015: Work progress in around Sec-71, Noida.
- Nov 2015: 700 piles (pillar foundation) out of total 5000 have been made.
- Feb 2016: NMRC completes first phase of construction in eight months. At this rate, the corridor is expected to be operational publicly by May 2017.
- Feb 2017: 70% work completed.
- Mar 2017: Train trials to start by December 2017 and commercial operations by April 2018.
- June 2017: Commercial operations to start by April 2018.
- July 2017: 95% civil work of track and metro station completed, trial to start by year end.
- Aug 2017: Metro train trial to start by year end on 6-km track from Depot station to Knowledge Park station.
- Sep 2017: Commercial operations to start by April 2018.
- Oct 2017: 97% civil work done. All stations to be ready by October end.
- Nov 2017: The last girder was placed thus completing viaduct work for whole metro line.
- Dec 2017: Four Aqua Line coaches arrive from China, each costing INR 11 crores. Trial run to begin soon.
- Jan 2018: Limited trial run started on 1 km (0.62 mi) stretch.
- Mar 2018: Full-fledged trial run to start in April.
- Jun 2018: Trial runs going on from Gr Noida Depot to Noida Sector-148 slowly it will be extended to terminating station in Noida Sector-71. The line will become fully operational by Dec 2018.
- Sep 2018: Trials continued for extended month till November 2018.
- Nov 2018: Currently, the corridor is undergoing extensive trials prior to final inspection by the commissioner of metro rail safety.
- Dec 2018: Safety trial successfully conducted and fares decided.
- Jan 2019: On 25 January, Aqua line was inaugurated by Uttar Pradesh Chief Minister Yogi Adityanath & cabinet minister for Housing and Urban Affairs Hardeep Singh Puri.

=== Phase 2 ===
- Dec 2018: Uttar Pradesh government approved the project on 04-Dec-2018.
- Aug 2019: Project to get delayed due to financial viability. PPP mode to be explored.
- Dec 2019: Project approved in Uttar Pradesh cabinet meeting, project deadline set to 2022
- Jun 2020: Tenders invited and to be submitted by end of June-2020.
- July 2020: Tender for construction to be awarded by September.
- Feb 2021: The tender and bidding process for Noida Aqua-Line Extension Project was conducted thrice between June 2020 and February 2021 but all three times they were cancelled due to relatively low response from the construction companies.
- June 2021: Tender for the Noida Metro Aqua Line Extension has been floated for the fourth time
- July 2021: This time NMRC has received 3 bids from Sam India Builtwell, GR Infra Projects, and Ashoka Buildcon. After the technical evaluation of bids NMRC has final candidates.

== Infrastructure ==
=== Rolling stock ===
The metro uses lightweight rakes made of stainless steel and aluminum, manufactured by China's CRRC Corporation. Each train has a seating capacity of 186 and a standing capacity of 848, with total capacity of 1,034 passengers. Nineteen rakes with four coaches each, a total of 76 coaches, will operate of the Aqua Line. The cost of each coach is ₹4 crore (US$430,000). Trains are equipped with a passenger information system, a public address system and an emergency announcement system from the operation control centre.

=== Power ===
All 21 stations, the train depot, and the NMRC offices will be powered by solar energy. The NMRC will install solar panels on the rooftops of all stations, footbridges, its main office building, the depot and parking lot boundary walls to generate an estimated 12 MW of solar power daily. The metro system will also be supplemented with conventional electricity, which will also be used as a backup. Trains will not be powered by solar power, and will instead use conventional power supply.

=== Signaling ===
The Noida Metro's signalling and train control system is based on Communications-Based Train Control (CBTC) technology supplied by a consortium led by Ansaldo STS (now part of Hitachi Rail).

=== City bus & Feeder bus ===
In the first phase, 50 AC CNG buses low floor buses are being operated on 6 routes. Noida and Greater Noida authorities were given the responsibility of running the City Bus Service in the ratio of 70:30 to the Noida Metro Rail Corporation. Urban Mass Transit Company (UMTC) presented the assessment of requirement of buses on 27 routes by conducting a survey for the city bus service and monitoring will be done by Uttar Pradesh State Road Transport Corporation. While one route will provide service as Metro feeder buses, two routes will cover intra city service, while one route will be for intra connectivity in Greater Noida city. Two routes have also been dedicated for connectivity between the cities of Noida and Greater Noida. The salient features of buses operated are:

- All buses are air conditioned buses propelled with BS-IV CNG fuel
- Technical specification of buses compatible with Urban Bus Specification –II as published by MOUD Govt. of India
- The entry floor height of the bus is 340 mm, the first of its kind in India
- The bus has provision of a kneeling mechanism with manual ramp for disabled persons
- The bus is completely ITS equipped with PIS Boards and LED boards
- CCTV have been fitted inside the bus for safety of passengers

== Operations ==
Trains operate at an average speed of 35 km/h (22 mph) with a headway of ten minutes during non-peak hours and 7.30 minutes during peak hours from Monday to Friday, 15 minutes headway for Saturday and Sunday.

=== Ridership ===
Passenger usage on the Aqua Line has grown considerably since the corridor became operational in 2019, reflecting increasing urban development across Noida and Greater Noida as well as stronger feeder connectivity to surrounding sectors. The network initially recorded average daily ridership figures of nearly 11,852 passengers during its early operational phase. Ridership later crossed the 50,000 daily passenger mark, while the highest single-day usage recorded on the line was 74,370 passengers during the Uttar Pradesh International Trade Show in September 2025. By January 2026, the average daily ridership on the Aqua Line had increased to more than 63,000 passengers.

== See also ==
- Urban rail transit in India
  - List of Noida Metro stations
  - Delhi Metro
    - Blue Line (Delhi Metro)
  - Rapid Metro Gurgaon
- National Capital Region (India)
  - Yamuna Expressway
  - Noida–Greater Noida Expressway
