= Ranhera =

- Nicknames: Nanhera, nanera
- 28°11′9.87″N 77°37′31.62″E Ranhera (India)
- Country: India
- State: Uttar Pradesh
- District: Gautam Buddha Nagar

Government
  - Type: YEIDA
  - Body: Development Authority
- Elevation: 195.74 m (642.2 ft)

Population (2011)
  - Total: 4,650

Languages
  - Official: Hindi
- Time zone: UTC+5:30 (IST)
- PIN: 203155
- Telephone code: 05738
- Vehicle registration: UP- 16
- Website: www.gbnagar.nic.in

Ranhera is a village and a Gram Panchayat in Jewar block of Gautam Buddha Nagar District in the Indian state of Uttar Pradesh.

== Community and demographics ==
Ranhera is a village in the Jewar area of Gautam Buddha Nagar district in Uttar Pradesh. It lies close to Greater Noida and, despite ongoing development in nearby areas, the village still follows a largely traditional rural way of life where community and family ties remain important.

The population of Ranhera is mainly made up of Chhokar Rajputs and Brahmin, who are considered part of the Jadaun–Bhati Rajput lineage. Like many Rajput groups, they connect their identity to the broader Chandravanshi (Lunar) Kshatriya tradition and maintain a strong sense of ancestry and shared heritage.

According to local accounts, the Chhokar Rajputs trace their origins to Vijaya Pal of Bayana , who is came from Karauli in present-day Rajasthan. He is said to have established Jewar, which today is a well-known settlement in outskirts of Greater Noida with a strong Rajput(Thakur) presence and historical links to nearby villages like Ranhera.

Families belonging to the Chhokar Rajput community are spread across nearly 60 villages in the surrounding region, creating a network of closely related settlements. In this area, they live alongside other Rajput communities such as the Bhati, Solanki, and Chauhan Rajputs, all of whom have been part of the region for generations. In the broader district, Rajputs are often seen as a significant voting group, with local estimates suggesting their numbers range between about 4.5 to 5 lakh voters across Gautam Buddha Nagar district, giving them a noticeable presence in local electoral dynamics.

The wider Jewar region also has a strong Rajput background. Bhati Rajputs are said to be present in around 360 villages, which is why the area is sometimes informally called “Mini Bhatner.” Solanki Rajputs are associated with roughly 144 villages, while Chauhan Rajputs are also found across several parts of the region.

== Location ==
Ranhera is located in the suburbs of about 30 km. Greater Noida about 60 km from Noida and 66 km from New Delhi and is situated on the northeast bank of the Yamuna River. It is located between 28.13° North latitude and 77.55° East longitude at a height of 195 metres (639 feet) above mean sea level. Ranhera is situated near yamuna expressway (Noida to Agra) about 7 km far away.(Airport Land) the land of naga baba. Now move to Faleda Cut.

== Overview ==
History records that the town was named after the sage Sri Nagababa. In the west of Ranhera at a distance of 1 km is an ashram and an old temple of the Sri Nagababa. Other temples in the town is the chawk Mandir and the Shiv mandir. There is a Sarva UP Gramin Bank (PNB) Branch.

Shri Rajaram Hospital provide affordable and competent care to all sections of society "a good patient care & concern with dedication for patient and their family since early nineteenth century". Ranhera village comes under YEIDA (Yamuna Expressway Industrial Development Authority). Its member of the Legislative Assembly is Thakur Dhirendra Singh Bhati, Ranhera falls under Jewar Constituency.

According to the Indian census report published in 2014, a population of 7800 was recorded. Males account for 52% of the population and females account for 48% of the population. In Ranhera, 22% of the population is less than six years of age. The census report throws light on the literacy rate of the village which is 79.95% which is higher than the national average literacy rate of 59.5%. The male literacy rate is 86% and the female literacy rate is 66.65%.

It is located in the outskirts of Greater Noida, the district headquarters of GB Nagar. It is about 35 km (22 mi) away from Noida, and one can come via Dankaur, Rabupura. An eight-lane Yamuna Expressway connects Jewar from Greater Noida and Agra. This whole district including Noida/ Greater Noida is said to be one of the most fast developing areas of India, it is about 46 km The Buddh International Circuit is an Indian motor racing circuit in Dankaur.

Before realignment of Jewar to Gautam Budh Nagar, it was part of Bulandshahr district of U.P.

== Primary and secondary education ==
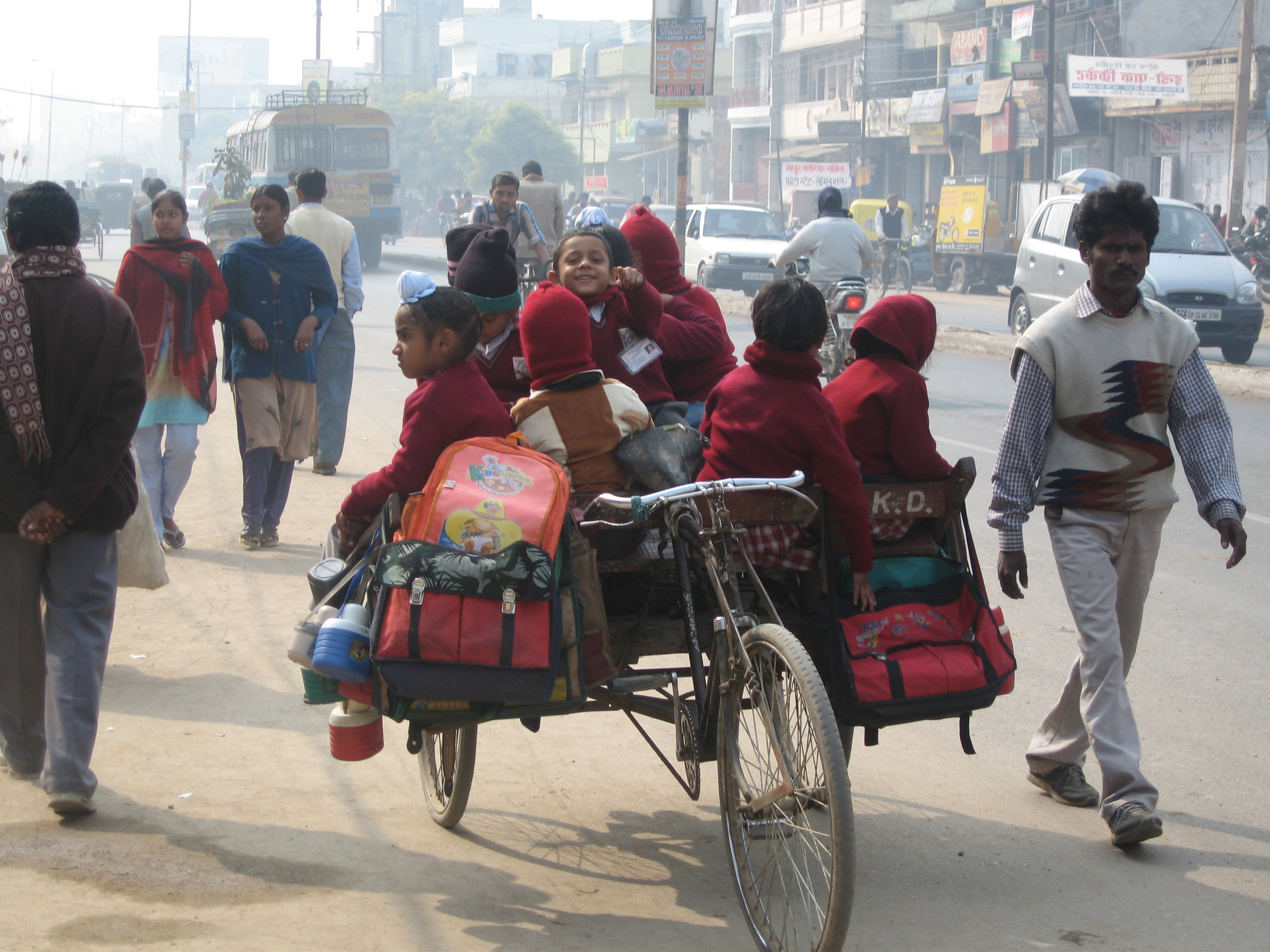
Children in a school-rickshaw on their way to school

Most schools in the state are affiliated to Uttar Pradesh Madhyamik Shiksha Parishad (commonly referred to as U.P board) with English or Hindi as the medium of instruction, while schools affiliated to Central Board of Secondary Education(CBSE) English as medium of instruction are also present.

== Culture ==
Ranhera is a cosmopolitan city due to the multi-ethnic and multi-cultural presence of the vast Indian bureaucracy and political status has amplified the importance of national events and holidays. National events such as Republic Day, Independence Day and Gandhi Jayanti (Gandhi's birthday) are celebrated with great enthusiasm in Ranhera and the rest of India. On India's Independence Day (15 August) celebrate the day by flying kites, which are considered a symbol of freedom. The Republic Day Parade.

Religious festivals include Diwali (the festival of light), Maha Shivaratri, and Ganesh chaturthi is most festival in village Teej, Durga Puja, Holi, Budha baba, Raksha Bandhan. Vasant Panchami (the Spring Festival) is held every year in Ranhera.

== Connectivity ==
Ranhera is mainly connected to other major sites through roads and rail network. People commute to Delhi by rail from Palwal, Khurja and Vear. Khurja is around 27 km from Ranhera and Palwal is around 38 km away. Palwal is main Annaj Mandi and farmers go there to sell their crops. Palwal is city of Haryana, Initially part of Faridabad district but from 2008, Palwal is a separate district. Some state bus also run 2 times a day to Greater Noida District center.

Ranhera is a village with high property value. In the west is Haryana state. Ranhera of Jewar is a Tehsil, and well connected to many tehsils and districts by road namely Khurja, Sikandrabad, Bulandshahr, Khair, Aligarh and Palwal (District - Faridabad in Haryana).)

Bhabokara (2 km), Deorar (3 km), Parohi (3 km), Khwajpur (3 km), Rohi (3 km) are the nearby Villages to Ranhera. Ranhera is surrounded by Tappal Tehsil towards South, Chandaus Tehsil towards East, Hassanpur Tehsil towards South, Khurja Tehsil towards East.

Palwal, Bulandshahr, Sikandrabad, Hodal are the nearby Cities to Ranhera.

This Place is in the border of the Gautam Buddha Nagar District and Aligarh District. Aligarh District Tappal is South towards this place. Also it is in the Border of other district Faridabad. It is near to the Haryana State Border.
