= Mirzapur and Nilonip Shahpur =

Village in Uttar Pradesh, India

Mirzapur and Nilonip Shahpur are historically recognized as twin villages and residential area in the Gautam Budh Nagar district of Uttar Pradesh, India. It is a part of Yamuna Expressway Industrial Development Authority (YEIDA), located 7 km (4.3 mi) from Dankaur

== Community ==
The main community in both villages is the Bhati Rajput clan, who trace their roots back to Rao Kasal Singh Bhati. He was a chieftain originally from Jaisalmer in present-day Rajasthan. According to historian, Rao Kasal Singh migrated to this area and set up Kasna-another village in Greater Noida with a strong Bhati Rajput presence—as his capital. From there, the influence of the Bhati Rajput clan spread to the surrounding regions.This larger region, which includes around 360 villages connected to the Bhati Rajput community, is locally called Bhatner. The name comes from the historical dominance of the Bhati Rajput clan in the area.

Out of these villages, about 150 are mainly Bhati Hindu Rajputs, while roughly 160 are home to Bhati Muslim Rajputs

Ghodi Bachheda, is often regarded as one of the most prominent and influential Bhati Rajput villages in the area.

In terms of population, the combined numbers for Mirzapur and Nilonip Shahpur are around 15,000 people, with about 12,000 belonging to the Bhati Rajput community. On a larger scale, the Gautam Buddha Nagar Lok Sabha constituency is estimated to have a Rajput population of over 450,000 to 500,000, highlighting the significance of the community is in the district.

Politically, the influence of the Bhati Rajput community is evident. For example Thakur Dhirendra Singh Bhati, is elected as the MLA for the 3rd time from the Jewar constituency in Greater Noida. His election reflects the community’s ongoing importance in local politics.

== Yamuna Expressway ==
Mirzapur and Nilonip Shahpur are situated on Yamuna Expressway between Dankaur and Jewar. This is one of the longest (6-lane) highway in India and joins Greater Noida to Agra.

== Education ==
- Government school inter college
- Primary school
- Dharm public school
- Kasturi deevi public school
- Agriculture college
- Kisan inter college in Dankaur at a distance of 5 km (3.1 mi).

== Transport ==
- Direct bus from ISBT Delhi to Mirzapur Niloni.
- Mirzapur Niloni to Noida and Greater Noida
- Mirzapur Niloni to Rabupura
- Mirzapur Niloni to Agra
- Auto service from Dankaur to Mirzapur Niloni
- Bus servies mirzapur to pari chowk

== Health ==
- Homeopathic dispensary
- Child care centre (Government)
- Animal hospital

== Nearby villages ==
- Achheja Buzurg
- Dungarpur Rilka
- Bhatta
- Parsaul
- Ronija
- Salarpur
- Rustampur
- Rabupura
