= Rabupura =

- Town
- Location in Uttar Pradesh, India
- Coordinates: 28.25°N 77.6°E
- Country: India
- State: Uttar Pradesh
- District: Gautam Buddha Nagar
- Elevation: 196 m (643 ft)

Population (2001)
  - Total: 13,024

Language
  - Official: Hindi
  - Additional official: Urdu
- Time zone: UTC+5:30 (IST)
- PIN: 203209
- Vehicle registration: UP-16

Rabupura is a town and a nagar panchayat in Jewar Tehsil, Gautam Buddha Nagar district in the Indian state of Uttar Pradesh. It is situated on Yamuna Expressway. A new Film City is planned at Rabupura by the Yamuna Expressway Industrial Development Authority (YEIDA).

== Community ==
The main community in this village is the Bhati Rajput clan, who trace their roots back to Rao Kasal Singh Bhati. He was a chieftain originally from Jaisalmer in present-day Rajasthan. According to historian, Rao Kasal Singh migrated to this area and set up Kasna-another village in Greater Noida with a strong Bhati Rajput presence—as his capital. From there, the influence of the Bhati Rajput clan spread to the surrounding regions.This larger region, which includes around 360 villages connected to the Bhati Rajput community, is locally called mini Bhatner. The name comes from the historical dominance of the Bhati Rajput clan in the area.

Out of these villages, about 150 are mainly Bhati Hindu Rajputs, while roughly 160 are home to Bhati Muslim Rajputs

Ghodi Bachheda, is often regarded as one of the most prominent and influential Bhati Rajput villages in the area along with Maincha.

In terms of population, the numbers of Rabupura are around 23,000 people, with about 19,000 belonging to the Bhati Rajput community. On a larger scale, the Gautam Buddha Nagar Lok Sabha constituency is estimated to have a Rajput population of over 450,000 to 500,000, highlighting the significance of the community is in the district.

Politically, the influence of the Bhati Rajput community is evident. For example Thakur Dhirendra Singh Bhati, is elected as the MLA for the 3rd time from the Jewar constituency in Greater Noida. His election reflects the community’s ongoing importance in local politics.

== Geography ==
Rabupura is located at 28.25°N 77.6°E. It has an average elevation of 196 metres (643 feet).

On the north side is Rustampur and Pachokara, while on south side is Tirthali industrial sector. Mohammadabad Kheda is located on west side and Jhajhar is located on east side of Rabupura.

== Demographics ==
As of 2011 India census, Rabupura had a population of 23,024. Males constitute 53% of the population and females 47%. Rabupura has an average literacy rate of 58.96%, lower than the national average of 59.5%: male literacy is 69.64%, and female literacy is 46.75%.

== Connectivity ==
=== Road ===
Rabupura is situated on the Yamuna Expressway, between Dankaur and Jewar and just opposite to Mohammadabad Kheda village.

=== Rail ===
The nearest railway station is Chola on the Delhi-Kanpur section of Indian railways. The Chola railway station is situated on Jewar-Bulandshahr (NH-334DD).

== Notable person ==
- Dhirendra Singh Bhati, MLA of Jewar-Greater Noida
