= Tilapta Karanwas =

Village in Greater Noida

Tilapta Karanwas Tilpata Karanwas
- Village
- Location in Uttar Pradesh, India Tilapta Karanwas (India)
- Coordinates: 28.525°N 77.525°E
- Country: India
- State: Uttar Pradesh
- District: Gautam Buddha Nagar
- Tehsil: Dadri
- Gram panchayat: Tilapta Karanwas

Government
  - Type: Panchayati raj
  - Body: Gram Panchayat

Area
  - Total: 3.96 km^{2} (1.53 sq mi)
- Elevation: 211 m (692 ft)

Population (2011)
  - Total: 8,378
  - Density: 2,120/km^{2} (5,480/sq mi)

Languages
  - Official: Hindi
- Time zone: UTC+5:30 (IST)
- PIN: 201306
- ISO 3166 code: IN-UP

Tilapta Karanwas (also spelled Tilpata Karanwas) is a village in Dadri tehsil of Gautam Buddha Nagar district in the Indian state of Uttar Pradesh. Located approximately 5 kilometres (3.1 mi) from Dadri and 8 kilometres (5.0 mi) from the district headquarters at Greater Noida, the village is part of the National Capital Region (NCR) and has experienced significant development due to its proximity to major urban centres.

As per the 2011 Census of India, Tilapta Karanwas has a population of 8,378 people residing in 1,384 households, spread across an area of 396.13 hectares (3.9613 km^{2}). The village has a literacy rate of 79.81%, which is higher than the Uttar Pradesh state average, and serves as an example of rural development in the rapidly urbanising region.

== Geography ==
Tilapta Karanwas is situated at an elevation of 211 metres (692 ft) above sea level. The village covers a total geographical area of 396.13 hectares (3.9613 km^{2}), resulting in a population density of approximately 2,115 inhabitants per square kilometre (5,480/sq mi).

The village is strategically located within the Greater Noida region, with nearby settlements including Devla (2.4 kilometres (1.5 mi)), Surajpur (3.83 kilometres (2.38 mi)), and several sectors of Greater Noida within a 10 kilometres (6.2 mi) radius. This proximity to planned urban townships has influenced the village's development trajectory.

== Community ==
The main community in this village is the Bhati Rajput clan, who trace their roots back to Rao Kasal Singh Bhati. He was a chieftain originally from Jaisalmer in present-day Rajasthan. According to historian, Rao Kasal Singh migrated to this area and set up Kasna-another village in Greater Noida with a strong Bhati Rajput presence—as his capital. From there, the influence of the Bhati Rajput clan spread to the surrounding regions.This larger region, which includes around 360 villages connected to the Bhati Rajput community, is locally called mini Bhatner. The name comes from the historical dominance of the Bhati Rajput clan in the area.

Out of these villages, about 150 are mainly Hindu Bhati Rajput, while roughly 160 are home to Bhati Muslim Rajput

Ghodi Bachheda, is often regarded as one of the most prominent and influential Bhati Rajput villages in the area.

In terms of population, the numbers of Tilapta Karanwas are around 12,000 people, with about 9,000 belonging to the Bhati Rajput (Hindu) community. On a larger scale, the Gautam Buddha Nagar Lok Sabha constituency is estimated to have a Rajput population of over 450,000 to 500,000, highlighting the significance of the community is in the district.

== Demographics ==
Historical population
Year	Pop.	±%
2011	8,378	—
Source: Census of India

According to the 2011 Census of India, Tilapta Karanwas had a population of 8,378, making it one of the larger villages in Dadri tehsil. The village comprises 4,442 males (53.0%) and 3,936 females (47.0%), resulting in a sex ratio of 886 females per 1,000 males, which is below the Uttar Pradesh state average of 912.

The village has a young demographic profile, with 1,284 children in the 0–6 age group, representing 15.33% of the total population. The child sex ratio stands at 821 girls per 1,000 boys.

=== Social composition ===
Tilapta Karanwas has a significant Scheduled Caste population of 1,238 people (5.08% of total population), which is higher than the national average. The village has no Scheduled Tribe population according to the 2011 census.

=== Literacy and education ===
The village demonstrates commendable educational progress with an overall literacy rate of 79.81%, significantly higher than the Uttar Pradesh state average of 67.68%. Male literacy stands at 90.39%, while female literacy is 68.04%. A total of 5,662 people are literate, while 2,716 remain illiterate.

Several educational institutions serve the area, including government and private schools that follow various educational boards.

== Economy ==
The village has a total working population of 1,993 people, representing a work participation rate of 23.8%. Of these, 1,407 are main workers and 586 are marginal workers. The workforce is predominantly male, with 1,785 male workers compared to 208 female workers.

Traditional agriculture remains important, though the village's economy is increasingly influenced by its proximity to the industrial and IT hubs of Noida and Greater Noida. Many residents commute to nearby urban centres for employment in manufacturing, services, and technology sectors.

== Infrastructure ==
=== Transportation ===
Tilapta Karanwas :an be accessed in the following ways

- Road connectivity: Well-connected by roads to Dadri, Greater Noida, and the National Capital Region
- Public transport: Both public and private bus services are available within the village
- Railway access: Railway station available within 5 kilometres (3.1 mi)
- Metro connectivity: Access to the Aqua Line metro system through nearby Greater Noida stations

=== Postal services ===
The village has its own Branch Post Office with the postal code 201306, falling under the Ghaziabad Division and Lucknow HQ Region.

== Governance ==
Tilapta Karanwas operates under the Panchayati raj system established by the 73rd Constitutional Amendment. The village is administered by an elected Sarpanch (village head) who represents the gram panchayat.

Political representation:

- Assembly constituency: Dadri
- Parliamentary constituency: Gautam Buddha Nagar

== Development ==
The village has benefited from its location within the National Capital Region and proximity to major infrastructure projects:

=== Regional development ===
- Noida International Airport: The upcoming international airport at Jewar, approximately 25 kilometres (16 mi) away, is expected to significantly impact the village's development
- Greater Noida Infrastructure: Ongoing urban development projects in Greater Noida directly influence the village's growth prospects
- Industrial Parks: Proximity to various industrial townships and manufacturing hubs provides employment opportunities

=== Regional integration ===
As part of the Greater Noida region, Tilapta Karanwas is increasingly integrated into the broader NCR economy while maintaining its rural character and agricultural base.

== See also ==
- Dadri
- Greater Noida
- National Capital Region (India)
