= Khurja Lok Sabha constituency =

Former constituency of the Indian parliament in Uttar Pradesh

Coordinates: 28.3°N 77.9°E

Khurja
- Former Lok Sabha constituency

Constituency details
- Country: India
- Region: North India
- State: Uttar Pradesh
- Established: 1962
- Abolished: 2008

Khurja was a Lok Sabha constituency in Uttar Pradesh, India.

== Assembly segments ==
=== 1961-1976 ===
1. Jewar
2. Khurja
3. Chhatari
4. Sikandrabad
5. Dadri

=== 1976-2008 ===
1. Jewar
2. Khurja
3. Debai
4. Sikandrabad
5. Dadri (Noida area)

== Members of Parliament ==
=== 1962-2008 ===
Year	Winner	Party
1962	K.L. Balmiki	Indian National Congress
1967	Ram Charan	Praja Socialist Party
1971	Hari Singh	Indian National Congress
1977	Mohan Lal Pipil	Janata Party
1980	Trilok Chand	Janata Party (Secular)
1984	Vir Sen	Indian National Congress
1989	Bhagwan Dass Rathore	Janata Dal
1991	Roshan Lal	Janata Dal
1996	Thakur Virendra Singh Chauhan	Bharatiya Janata Party
1998	Thakur Virendra Singh Chauhan	Bharatiya Janata Party
1999	Thakur Virendra Singh Chauhan	Bharatiya Janata Party
2004	Thakur Virendra Singh Chauhan	Bharatiya Janata Party
Constituency abolished in 2008.

=== 2008-Present ===
See Gautam Buddha Nagar Lok Sabha and Bulandshahr Lok Sabha seats.

== See also ==
- Khurja
- List of constituencies of the Lok Sabha
