= The Brotherhood (2017 film) =

- Directed by: Pankaj Parashar
- Based on: Dadri mob lynching incident
- Produced by: Pankaj Parashar
- Release date: 2017
- Country: India
- Language: Hindi

The Brotherhood is a 2017 Indian documentary film based on the Dadri mob lynching incident in Greater Noida Uttar Pradesh that triggered national outrage. Senior journalist Pankaj Parashar is the director and producer of the documentary. The Brotherhood is an attempt to promote cultural harmony in the region. The documentary was released on YouTube on May 30, 2017 and received an overwhelming response from the audience.

== Concept and story ==
The film 'The Brotherhood' begins with the case of the Dadri Lynching of 2015, setting it apart from the communal harmony that existed in western Uttar Pradesh. The documentary explores the past of the Bhati clan, encompassing both Hindu and Muslim branches, with an emphasis on the interfaith ties between the villages of Ghodi Bachheda in Greater Noida and Til Begampur in Bulandshahr. In the villages in question, the Hindus revere the Muslims as elder members of their family lineage.

== Historical connections ==
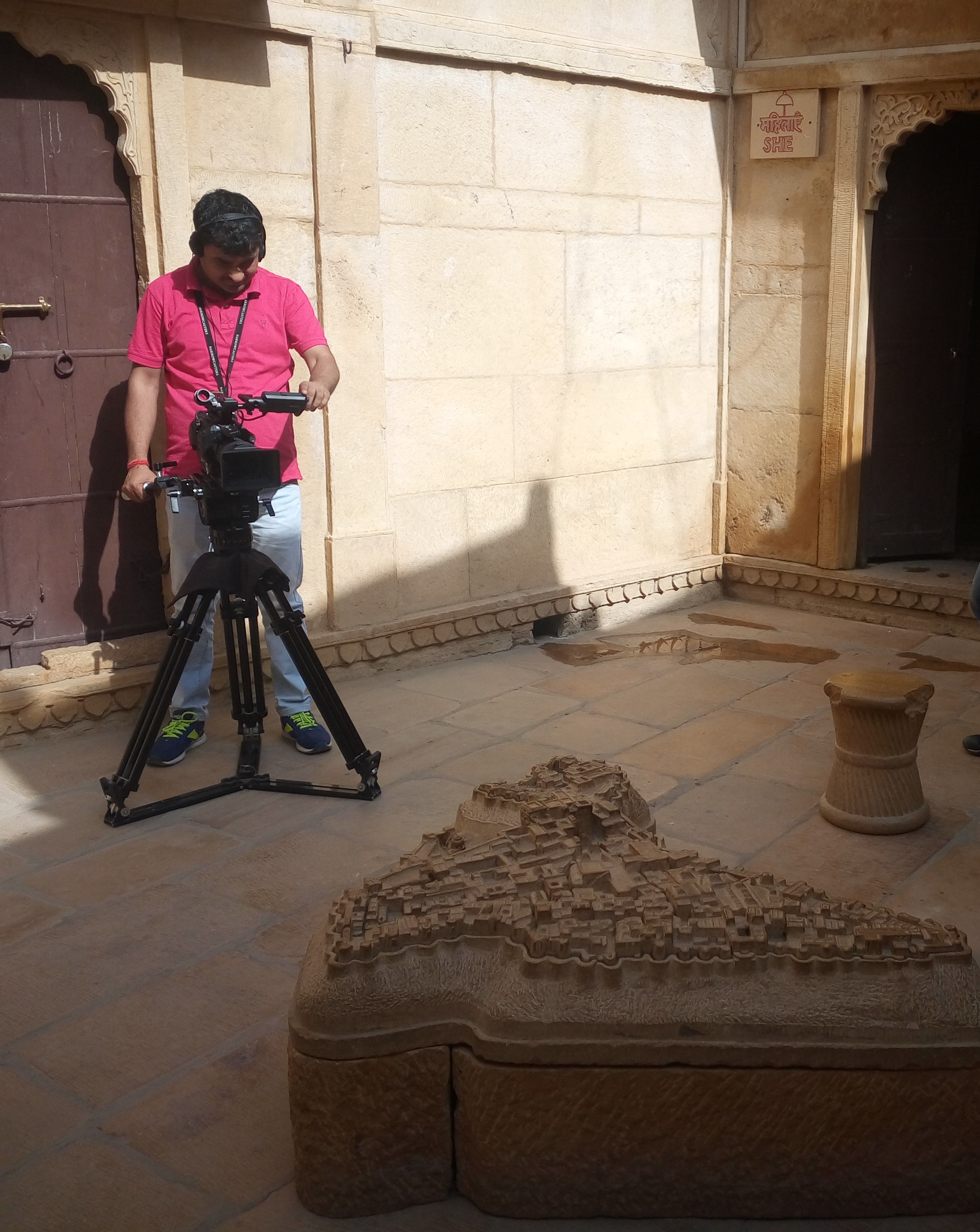
Pankaj Parashar during the making of documentary film The Brotherhood.

No Muslim family left Bhatner to go to Pakistan during the partition of India because the elders convinced them of peaceful co-existence. During the revolt of 1857, both Hindu and Muslim Bhatis fought with Britishers and sacrificed together. An example of recent days filmed in documentary related with 2017 Uttar Pradesh Legislative Assembly election. Hindu and Muslim voters were divided, but Hindu and the Muslim Bhatis combined. Owing to this, for the first time after freedom, a Bhati Thakur candidate Dhirendra Singh was elected from Jewar (Assembly constituency). These voters, instead of being divided on the basis of Hindu and Muslim, voted comprehensively without being swayed. The effort is to bring the community together to voice their feelings unabashedly, and make the region an example of progressive and culturally inclusive governance.

== Trailer of the documentary ==
A trailer of the documentary was released on May 16, 2017, on YouTube. A technical preview of the documentary was held at Birla Institute of Management Technology Greater Noida on April 24, 2017. Viewers are appreciating the message. Documentary is under certification process before Central Board of Film Certification of India.

== Controversy with CBFC ==
The Central Board of Film Certification India (CBFC) had many objections on the documentary film. The Board gave orders to cut three scenes from the film. Even after this, the Board wanted to give a U/A certificate, while Pankaj Parashar was demanding a V/U certificate. He appealed the CBFC order before the Film Censor Appellate Tribunal (FCAT). The Chairman of the Tribunal, Justice Manmohan Sarin, members Shazia Ilmi and Poonam Dhillon saw the film during the hearing. After watching the film, the tribunal passed a unanimous order. The tribunal said, "This documentary film is a commendable effort to communal harmony in the country and especially the message of unity among the largest Hindu and Muslim communities." FCAT ordered to CBFC to certify the film with a V/U category.

== Release and broadcast ==
Documentary film was released on YouTube and other social media platforms on August 15, 2018, the occasion of Indian Independence day. Its special previews were aired on DTH service Tata Sky.
