= Vir Sen =

Indian politician

Vir Sen, Veer Sen

Union Minister of State for Environment and Forests

Member of Parliament, Lok Sabha
- In office 1984-1989
- Preceded by: Trilok Chand
- Succeeded by: Bhagwan Dass Rathore
- Constituency: Khurja

Memeber of the Uttar Pradesh Legislative Assembly
- Constituency: Hapur South (1952), Garhmukteshwar (1962)

Member of the Uttar Pradesh Public Service Commission (UPPSC)

Member of the Legislative Council (MLC)

Personal details
- Died: 2010 Ghaziabad, Utter Pradesh
- Party: Indian National Congress
- Other political affiliations: Bahujan Samaj Party (1996)
- Spouse: Raj Rani

Vir Sen, also spelt Veer Sen is an Indian politician. He was elected to the Lok Sabha, the lower house of the Parliament of India, from the Khurja constituency of Uttar Pradesh as a member of the Indian National Congress.

== Legislative Career ==
Vir Sen entered active electoral politics during India's landmark first general elections of 1951-1952.Representing the Indian National Congress, he contested the double member seat of Hapur South alongside fellow leader Luft Ali Khan. In a fiercely contested seat, he successfully defeated his close relative and influential grassroot leader and agrarian reformer, Munna Lal (Johri) of Kisan Mazdoor Praja Party (KMPP), to become 1st (MLA) Member Of Legislative Assembly of Hapur Uttar Pradesh (1952).

He also represented garhmukteshwar Assembly constituency in 3rd Vidhan Sabha Election (1962-1967) as their MLA. Later nominated to MLC in Uttar Pradesh.

1984-1989: Member of Parliament (MP), 8th Lok Sabha (Elected from Khurja Lok Sabha constituency in Western UP). He defeated the incumbent Trilok Chand from Lok Dal (LKD) by a wide margin of 118,025 votes, securing 212,932 votes against Trilok Chand's 94,907 votes.

Last, in 1996, 1996 Indian general election, Vir Sen temporarily transitioned from the Indian National Congress to join Bahujan Samaj Party, reportedly doing so at the personal request of party leader Mayawati. He contested the MP election from his former stronghold of the Khurja Lok Sabha constituency. Running on the BSP ticket, he secured a significant second place finish with 89,750 votes (20.51%), ultimately losing the seat to Ashok Pradhan of Bharatiya Janata Party

== Minister of State for Environment and Forests ==
On 31st December 1984, Prime Minister Rajiv Gandhi appointed Vir Sen to the Union Council of Ministers as the Union Minister of State for Environment and Forest. His tenure coincided with a major turning point in India's environmental history following the Bhopal disaster Administrative Overhaul: He actively managed the day to day administrative transition as the forest department as removed from the Ministry of Agriculture to be merged into a newly upgraded, independent Ministry of Environment and Forests (India). His office directed initial policy assessments and safety framework that subsequently culminated in the landmark enactment of the Environment (Protection) Act, 1986.

Advocating for Wildlife & Biodiversity: He also actively advocate and pushed forward national wildlife preservation targets like he famously collaborated with global bodies like the International Union for conservation of Nature (IUCN) during their commissions on national parks and protected areas in 1985, advocating for stricker biodiversity tracking across the Indomalayan realm.

Supporting Environmental Science and Research: He was responsible for inaugurating and funding research bodies to tackle escalating industrial waste and pollution. Notably on 17th March 1985, he formally inaugurated the silver jubilee celebrations of the National Environmental Engineering Research Institute (NEERI), highlighting the government push to integrate technological research with environmental cleanup. https://www.neeri.res.in/

== Death and Legacy ==
Vir Sen gradually stepped back from active politics in his later years. He passed away in 2010 in Ghaziabad. He is recognised by political historians as an important transitional leader who bridged early post Indian independence with modern national environmental and social policy frameworks.
