= Rajendra Singh Solanki =

Indian politician

Member of the Uttar Pradesh Legislative Assembly
- In office 1985–1989
- Preceded by: Yash Pal Singh
- Succeeded by: Narendra Bhati
- Constituency: Sikandrabad

Personal details
- Born: 1955 (age 70–71) Village Laduki, Bulandshahr district, Uttar Pradesh, India
- Party: Bahujan Samaj Party (2024–present)
- Other political affiliations: Indian National Congress (1975–2024); Bharatiya Janata Party (2007)
- Spouse: Swapna Solanki
- Children: 3
- Parent: Hira Singh (father)
- Education: NREC College, Khurja
- Occupation: Politician

Rajendra Singh Solanki (born 1955) is an Indian politician from Uttar Pradesh. A veteran leader formerly with the Indian National Congress, he rose to prominence as a youth leader under the mentorship of Sanjay Gandhi and N. D. Tiwari. He served one term as a Member of the Legislative Assembly (MLA) from the Sikandrabad constituency and has held several high-ranking positions within the Uttar Pradesh Congress Committee. In 2024, he joined the Bahujan Samaj Party to contest the Lok Sabha elections from Gautam Buddha Nagar.

== Early life and education ==
Solanki was born in 1950 in village Laduki, Bulandshahr district, Uttar Pradesh, to Hira Singh, a farmer. He began his leadership journey in student politics, serving as the President of the Student Union at NREC College, Khurja. He holds a post-graduate degree.

== Political career ==
=== Youth leadership ===
A founding member of the National Students' Union of India (NSUI), Solanki was appointed President of the Uttar Pradesh Youth Congress in 1976. During this period, he was regarded as a protégé of former Prime Minister Indira Gandhi and worked closely with Sanjay Gandhi and N. D. Tiwari.

=== Legislative and party roles ===
Solanki was elected as the MLA for the Sikandrabad constituency in 1985. Within the Congress organizational structure, He served two terms as the Vice President of the Uttar Pradesh Congress Committee (UPCC) and held the positions of General Secretary of the UPCC and President of the Uttar Pradesh Yuvak Mangal Dal.

In 2007, Solanki briefly joined the Bharatiya Janata Party (BJP) at the behest of Kalyan Singh to contest the state assembly elections from Sikandrabad, before eventually returning to the Congress party.

=== 2024 General Elections ===
In March 2024, after nearly 50 years with the Indian National Congress, Solanki joined the Bahujan Samaj Party (BSP). He contested the 2024 Indian general election from the Gautam Buddha Nagar Lok Sabha constituency, securing 2,51,615 votes.

== Political activism and imprisonment ==
During the late 1970s, Solanki was imprisoned multiple times in Lucknow, Dehradun, and Bareilly jails for his political activism, specifically for protesting the arrest of Indira Gandhi and participating in movements alongside Sanjay Gandhi.

== Influence ==
Solanki has been regarded as an influential leader in the Bulandshahr and Gautam Buddha Nagar regions, particularly among rural and agrarian communities.

== Electoral history ==
Year	Election	Constituency	Party	Votes	%	Opponent	Opponent party	Opponent votes	%	Result	Margin
1985	Assembly	Sikandrabad	INC	35,195	49.95	Shah Mal	Lok Dal	17,255	24.49	Won	17,940
1991	Assembly	Sikandrabad	INC	28,383	28.22	Narendra Bhati	Janata Dal	43,835	43.59	Lost	−15,452
2007	Assembly	Sikandrabad	BJP	30,630	21.71	Ved Ram Bhati	BSP	48,897	34.37	Lost	−18,267
2024	Lok Sabha	Gautam Buddh Nagar	BSP	251,615	17.51	Dr. Mahesh Sharma	BJP	857,829	59.69	Lost	−606,214

== Personal life ==
He is married to Swapna Solanki; the couple has three children. He resides in Defence Colony, New Delhi.
