= Bimla Singh Solanki =

Indian politician

MLA, 16th Legislative Assembly
- In office Mar 2012 – Mar 2022
- Preceded by: Vedram Bhati
- Succeeded by: Laxmiraj Singh
- Constituency: Sikandrabad

Personal details
- Born: 1 December 1959 (age 66) Faridabad district
- Party: Bharatiya Janata Party
- Education: Maharshi Dayanand University
- Profession: Businessperson, politician

Bimla Singh Solanki is an Indian politician and a member of the 16th and 17 Legislative Assembly of India. She represents the Sikandrabad constituency of Uttar Pradesh and is a member of the Bharatiya Janata Party political party.

== Early life and education ==
Bimla Singh Solanki was born in Village Ajronda (Sector 15A) of Faridabad district in a Rajput family. She enrolled in the Maharshi Dayanand University for Bachelor of Arts course but did not complete her education. She is educated till twelfth grade.

== Political career ==
Bimla Singh Solanki has been a MLA for two term. She represented the Sikandrabad constituency and is a member of the Bharatiya Janata Party political party.

== Posts held ==
#	From	To	Position	Comments
01	2012	Mar-2017	Member, 16th Legislative Assembly	
02	Mar-2017	Mar-2022	17th Legislative Assembly	

== See also ==
- Sikandrabad (Assembly constituency)
- Sixteenth Legislative Assembly of Uttar Pradesh
- Uttar Pradesh Legislative Assembly
