= Dadri Assembly constituency =

Dadri Assembly constituency may refer to:

- Dadri, Haryana Assembly constituency
- Dadri, Uttar Pradesh Assembly constituency
