= Nagar (surname) =

Nagar is a surname either Indian/Sanskrit ("city dweller") or Jewish/Hebrew ("carpenter") origin. Notable people with this surname include:

- Ajey Nagar (born 1999), Indian YouTube content creator
- Amritlal Nagar (1916–1990), prominent Hindi writer
- Anirudh Lal Nagar (1930–2014), Indian econometrician
- Babulal Nagar, Indian politician
- Lakhi Ram Nagar, Indian businessman and politician
- Lalit Nagar, Indian politician
- Lilith Nagar (born 1935), Israeli Arabic-language TV host, actress, singer
- Malook Nagar (born 1964), Indian politician
- Narendra Nagar (politician), Indian politician
- Nawab Singh Nagar, Indian politician
- Rajesh Nagar, Indian politician
- Richa Nagar (born 1968), Indian scholar, creative writer, educator
- Shuki Nagar (born 1977), former Israeli footballer
- Sumit Nagar (born 1998), Indian cricketer
- Surendra Singh Nagar (born 1965), Indian politician
- Tejpal Singh Nagar, Indian politician
- Yogesh Nagar (born 1990), Indian cricketer

== See also ==
- Nagara (disambiguation)
