= Nager =

Nager is a surname of multiple possible origins. It may be German term Näger for tailor or embroiderer. It may be a nickname from the Swiss German verb "nagen", "to nag", "to gnaw". It may be Yiddish alteration of the Hebrew surname Nagar, "carpenter"

- Edward Nager (1927–2021), American lawyer and politician
- Jesse Nager (born 1981), American actor and singer

== See also ==
- Nagar (disambiguation)
