= Chholas Sadat =

Chholas sadat
- Village
- Location in Uttar Pradesh, India
- Country: India
- State: Uttar Pradesh
- District: Gautam Budh Nagar

Government
  - Type: Elected member

Population (2011)
  - Total: 8,567
- Time zone: UTC+5:30 (IST)
- Postal code: 203207

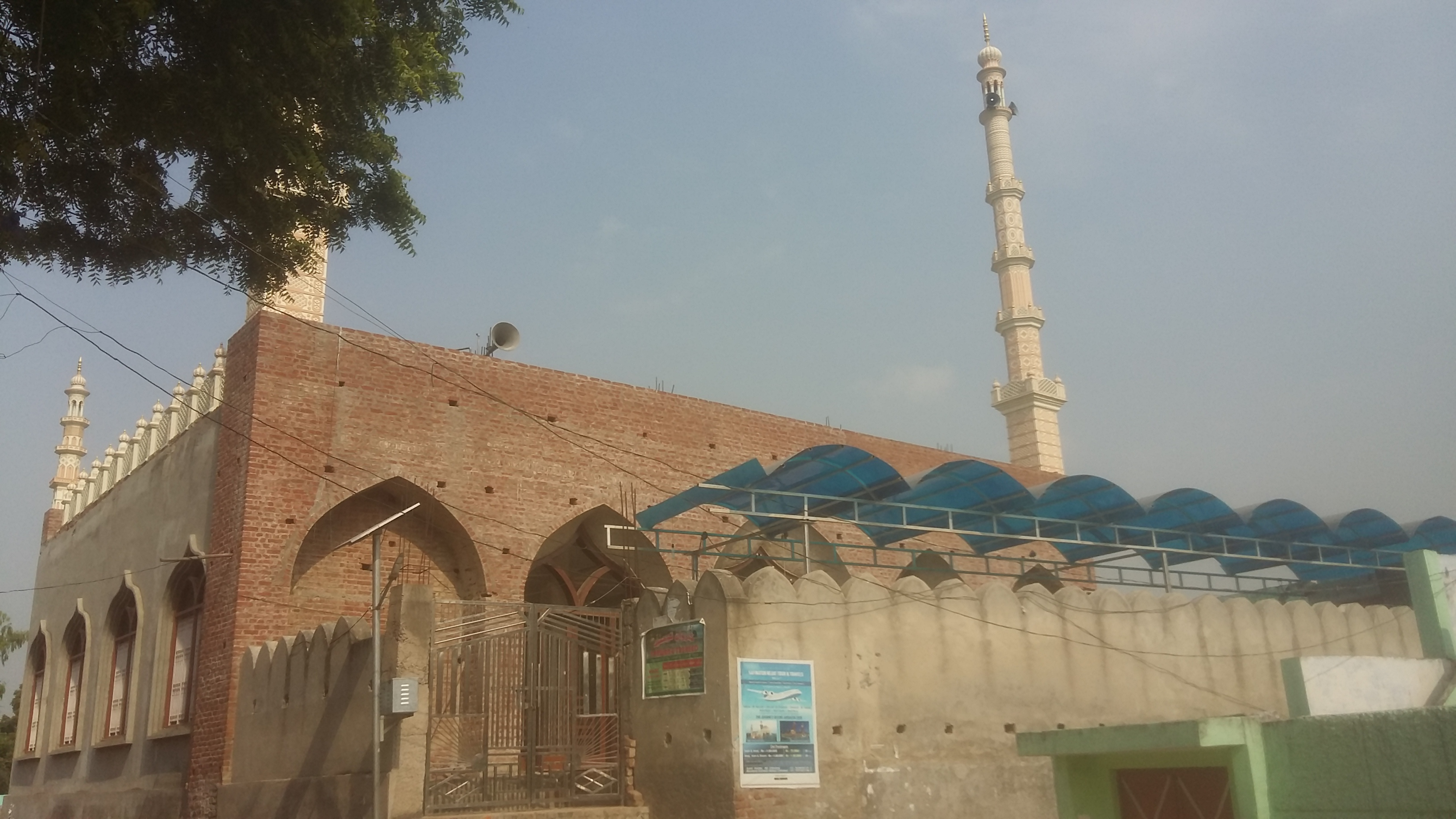
Juma Mosque Chholas Sadat, Uttar Pradesh, India.

Chholas is also known as Chholas Sadat. According to the 2011 census information, the location code or village code of Chholas village is 120197. Chholas is located in Tehsil Dadri, District Gautam Buddha Nagar in Uttar Pradesh. It is situated 14 km away from sub-district headquarter Dadri and 24 km away from district headquarter Gautam Buddha Nagar.

The village covers 653.04 hectares and has a total population of 6,192. There are about 993 houses in the village. The nearest town is Dadri.
