= Maincha =

- Location within Uttar Pradesh Location within India
- Coordinates: 28.447°N 77.604°E
- Country: India
- State: Uttar Pradesh
- District: Gautam Buddha Nagar
- Tehsil: Dadri
- Elevation: 210 m (690 ft)
- Time zone: UTC5:30 (IST)
- Postal code: 201310
- Area code: 201310

Maincha is a village in Gautam Budh Nagar district, Uttar Pradesh, India. It is surrounded by the villages of Rithori and Boraki. It is one of the biggest village of the region. It is adjacent to National Highway 2.The nearest railway station is Ajayabpur, Uttar Pradesh.

== Community ==
The main community in this village is the Bhati Rajput clan, who trace their roots back to Rao Kasal Singh Bhati. He was a chieftain originally from Jaisalmer in present-day Rajasthan. According to historian, Rao Kasal Singh migrated to this area and set up Kasna-another village in Greater Noida with a strong Bhati Rajput presence—as his capital. From there, the influence of the Bhati Rajput clan spread to the surrounding regions.This larger region, which includes around 360 villages connected to the Bhati Rajput community, is locally called mini Bhatner. The name comes from the historical dominance of the Bhati Rajput in the area.

Out of these villages, about 150 are mainly Bhati Hindu Rajputs, while roughly 160 are home to Bhati Muslim Rajputs

Ghodi Bachheda, is often regarded as one of the most prominent and influential Bhati Rajput villages in the area.

In terms of population, the numbers of Maincha are around 22,000 people, with about 19,000 belonging to the Bhati Rajput community. This is one of the richest village in the region this has also been termed as a smart village.

This village is also known as one of the largest villages in Greater Noida in terms of land area and population. The village covers a wide agricultural region and has expanded significantly with growing residential and infrastructure development nearby. On a larger scale, the Gautam Buddha Nagar Lok Sabha constituency is estimated to have a Rajput population of over 450,000 to 500,000, highlighting the significance of the community is in the district.

Politically, the influence of the Bhati Rajput community is evident. For example Thakur Dhirendra Singh Bhati, is elected as the MLA for the 3rd time from the Jewar constituency in Greater Noida. His election reflects the community’s ongoing importance in local politics.
