= Nawab Singh Nagar =

Indian politician

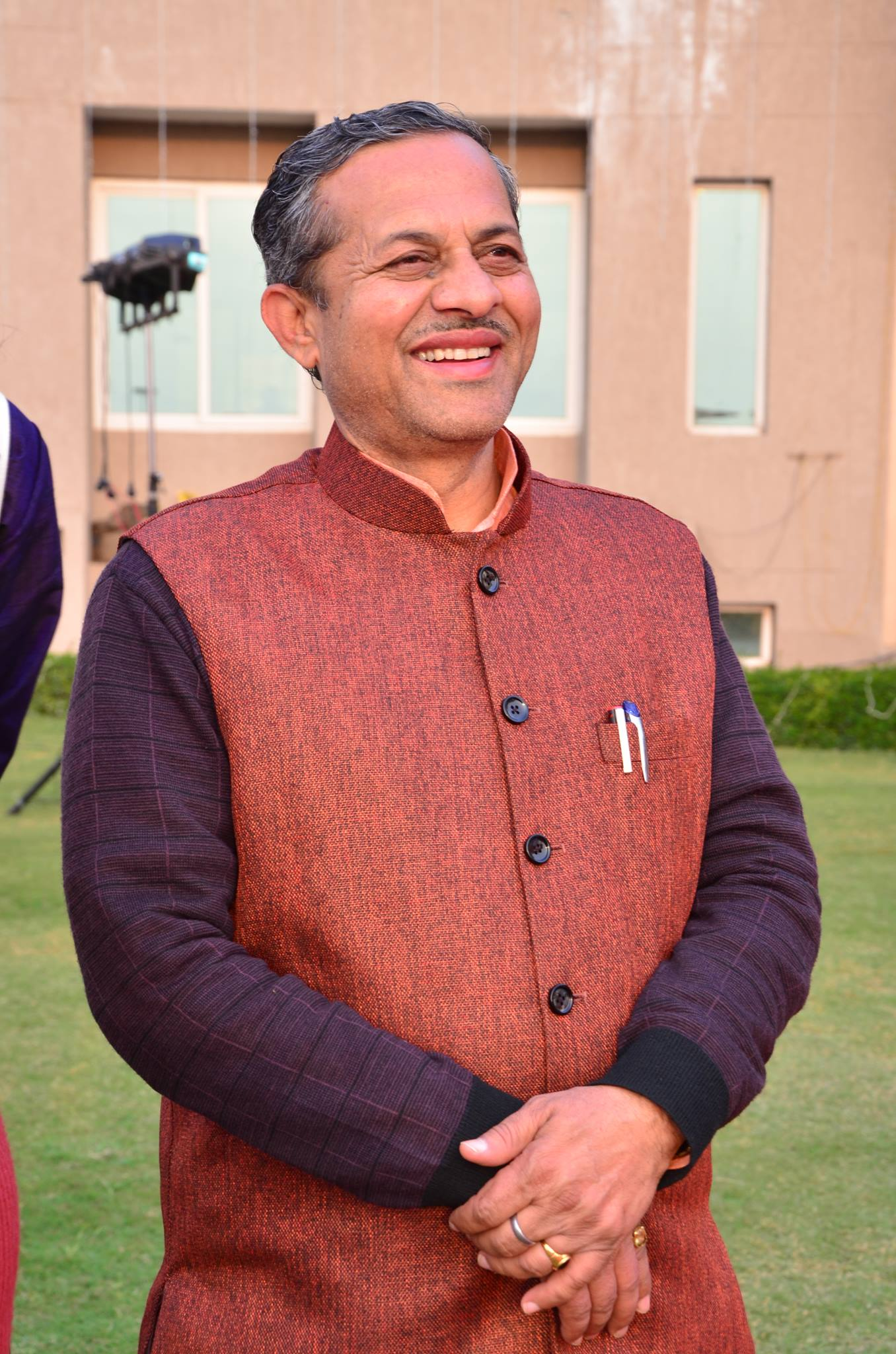

Member (MLA) of Uttar Pradesh Legislative Assembly
- In office 1996–2007
- Preceded by: Sameer Bhati
- Succeeded by: Satveer Singh Gurjar
- Constituency: Dadri

Personal details
- Born: 1 January 1960 (age 66)
- Party: Bharatiya Janata Party
- Education: Meerut University
- Occupation: Politician
- Profession: Business

Nawab Singh Nagar is an Indian politician. A member of the Bharatiya Janata Party, Nagar is a former Minister in the Government of Uttar Pradesh and served twice as Member of the Legislative Assembly for Dadri between 1996 and 2007. He is currently the chairperson of the Lal Bahadur Shastri Sugarcane Development Board and also the Vice-President of Uttar Pradesh BJP.

== Career ==
Nawab Singh Nagar joined RSS while at college. He left RSS for the Bharatiya Janata Party when the BJP was formed in the mid-1980s. He contested his first assembly election for the constituency of Dadri in 1993 under the BJP banner but lost to Sameer Bhati. He won his first election in 1996 defeating Sameer Bhati in the same constituency. In 2002, he was elected again. When the BJP formed the government in 2002, Nagar was appointed the State Irrigation Minister. Nagar lost the assembly election in 2007 to the BSP candidate, Satveer Gurjar. In 2013, he was appointed the National Vice President of BJP Kisan Morcha.

When the BJP was formed in 1980, Nagar was appointed the first Mandal president of Noida.

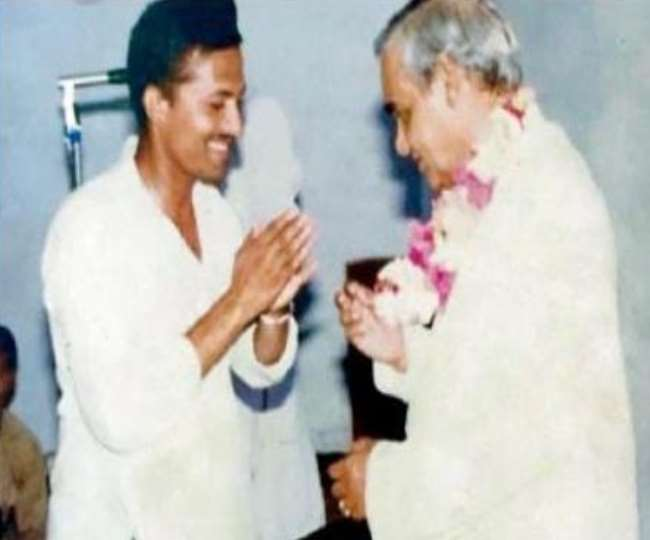
Nawab Singh Nagar with Atal Bihari Vajpayee in 1981

== Activism ==
Nagar has successfully campaigned against many government policies such as an increase in stamp duty and the transfer of Noida city funds outside the city. During the Ayodhya protest, he was detained by police for 21 days in Saharanpur Jail. He was also detained for challenging the then Noida Authority Chairperson Neera Yadav and sent to custody in Meerut. He was jailed several times and arrested a dozen times for his involvement in farmers' rights agitation and District reinstatement protests. He also started agitation against hike in electricity charges in Noida in January 2016.

Nagar started protesting against the toll collection on the DND Flyway in 2014 and held many strikes. In 2015, he organised a massive car rally to raise awareness against it. On 28 August 2016, he started an indefinite protest against the toll and was arrested on the following day after staging an overnight protest and making DND toll free for two days. On 26 October 2016, the Supreme Court of India ordered that the flyaway should be toll free.

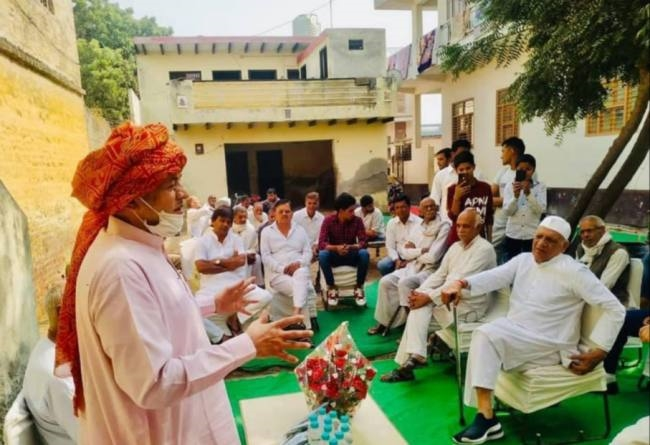

On 27 December 2016, Nagar protested against the exploitation of 21,000 land allottees by Yamuna authority and filed a Public Interest Litigation in Allahabad High Court. The protest was successful as the allotment was started by the authority within few weeks.

== Controversies ==
In 2015, Nawab Singh Nagar came into the limelight when he justified the infamous Dadri lynching of Mohammad Akhlaq by locals due to consumption of beef and called the accused as "innocent kids", which created a huge outrage accusing him of aggravating the violent situation. In 2017, there was a huge protest by the supporters of Nawab Singh when BJP denied him MLA ticket from Dadri Constituency. His angry supporters accused Gautam Budh Nagar Lok Sabha MP Mahesh Sharma of using his veto power against Nawab Singh since Mahesh Sharma was afraid of Nagar's stronghold in his constituency.
