= Narendra Bhati =

Indian Politician based in Uttar Pradesh

Member (MLC) of Uttar Pradesh Legislative Council
- Incumbent
- Assumed office 7 Mar 2016
- Preceded by: Anil Awana
- Constituency: Bulandshahar - Noida Local Authorities

Member (MLA) in Uttar Pradesh Legislative Assembly
- In office 1996–2002
- Preceded by: Virendra Pal Singh
- Succeeded by: Vedram Bhati
- Constituency: Sikandrabad
- In office 1989–1993
- Preceded by: Rajendra Singh Solanki
- Succeeded by: Virendra Pal Singh
- Constituency: Sikandrabad

Personal details
- Born: 1959 (age 66–67) Bodaki village, Greater Noida
- Party: Bharatiya Janata Party
- Children: 2 (Ashish and Robin)
- Parent: Prem Singh Bhati (father)
- Occupation: Politician

Narendra Singh Bhati (born 1959) is a political leader of Bharatiya Janta Party from Uttar Pradesh, India, and representing Uttar Pradesh Legislative Council as a MLC in Uttar Pradesh and chair of UP State Agro Industrial Corporation Limited.

== Early life ==
Born in 1958 in Bodaki village, Dadri, Gautam Budh Nagar, Bhati completed his intermediate class from Mihir Bhoj Inter College in 1977. He quickly rose through political ranks by becoming block Pramukh from Dadri in 1980. Three years later, he joined Lok Dal and won the assembly elections from Sikandrabad constituency in 1989, 1991 and 1996. He has started his political career as a member of the Youth Congress in 1975 from Dadri block.

== Positions held ==
#	From	To	Position	Party
1.	1989	1991	MLA of Sikandrabad in 10th Vidhan Sabha	Janata Dal
2.	1991	1993	MLA of Sikandrabad in 11th Vidhan Sabha	Janata Dal
3.	1996	2002	MLA of Sikandrabad in 13th Vidhan Sabha	SP
4.	2016	2022	MLC from Bulandshahr- Noida constituency	BJP
5.	2022	Present	MLC from Bulandshahr- Noida constituency	BJP

Narendra Singh Bhati lost the Sikandrabad Assembly seat in 1993, 2002 and 2007 election. Bhati also lost the 2009 and 2014 Lok Sabha election from Gautam Buddha Nagar seat.
