= Tejpal Singh Nagar =

Indian politician

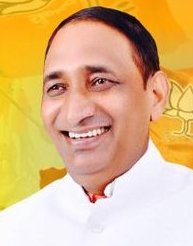

Member (MLA) of Uttar Pradesh Legislative Assembly
- Incumbent
- Assumed office March 2017
- Preceded by: Satveer Singh Gurjar
- Constituency: Dadri

Personal details
- Party: Bharatiya Janata Party
- Education: Bachelor of Education (B.Ed.)
- Occupation: Politician and Teacher

Tejpal Singh Nagar popularly known as Tejpal Master is an Indian politician from Uttar Pradesh. He is a member of 17th and 18th Uttar Pradesh Assembly and presently representing Dadri constituency since March 2017 as MLA. Tejpal Nagar is a member of the Bharatiya Janata Party (BJP).

== Early life and education ==
Tejpal Singh Nagar was born in a Gurjar family of Village Akilpur jagir in Gautam Budh Nagar district. He has done Postgraduation and posted as Principal in Sant Vinobha High School Vedpura, UP.

== Political career ==
Tejpal Singh Nagar has been chosen as Member of Legislative Assembly from Dadri constituency in the 18th Uttar Pradesh Assembly and was also member of 17th Legislative Assembly of India. He won the election by a margin of 80,177 to the two times MLA Satveer Singh Gurjar. He was a member of Zila panchayat. Many accused the local MP of favouring Tejpal Nagar over senior BJP leader Nawab Singh Nagar for Dadri seat in 2017 state elections. Fondly known as Tejpal Master, Nagar had secured 141,226 votes in the 2017 assembly polls and won by a margin of 80,000. He outperformed himself in his second term MLA elections on 10 February 2022 by getting 218,068 votes. His vote percentage also increased from 53.2% to 61.4%. He defeated Samajwadi Party’s national spokesperson Raj Kumar Bhati by a margin of 138,218 votes.
