= Umrao Singh Bhati =

Indian Gurjar ruler (died 1857)

Raja Rao Umrao Singh Bhati, also known as Rao Umrao Singh Bhati, was an Indian Gurjar ruler. This kingdom collapsed after the Indian Rebellion of 1857 because the king fought against The British Empire. The leader of the rebellion Bahadur Shah Zafar appointed the Nawab Walidad Khan of Mala-garh and Umrao Singh as the leader of Upper Doab (modern day western U.P).

He successfully led a band of armed soldiers against the British troops at the coast of the Hindon River on 30th and 31st May and was able to bring back the rule that previously existed. He was the chief organiser of the fight against the British in Dadri, Bulandshahr and Gautam Budh Nagar. He and his family members were captured later by the Britishers on 26 September 1857 and then he was crushed by the elephants.
