= Trilok Chand =

Indian politician

Member of Parliament, Lok Sabha
- In office 1980-1984
- Preceded by: Mohan Lal Pipil
- Succeeded by: Vir Sen
- Constituency: Khurja

Personal details
- Born: 2 December 1935
- Died: 27 December 2007
- Party: Janata Party
- Spouse: Ramvati Devi

Trilok Chand was an Indian politician. He was elected to the Lok Sabha, the lower house of the Parliament of India from the Khurja constituency of Uttar Pradesh as a member of the Janata Party.
