= Gautam Buddha Nagar Lok Sabha constituency =

Constituency of the Indian parliament in Uttar Pradesh

Coordinates: 28.36°N 77.55°E

Gautam Buddha Nagar UP-13
- Lok Sabha constituency
- Interactive Map Outlining Gautam Buddha Nagar Lok Sabha constituency

Constituency details
- Country: India
- Region: North India
- State: Uttar Pradesh
- Assembly constituencies: Noida; Dadri; Jewar; Sikandrabad; Khurja
- Established: 2008-present
- Total electors: 26,74,938
- Reservation: None

Member of Parliament
- 18th Lok Sabha
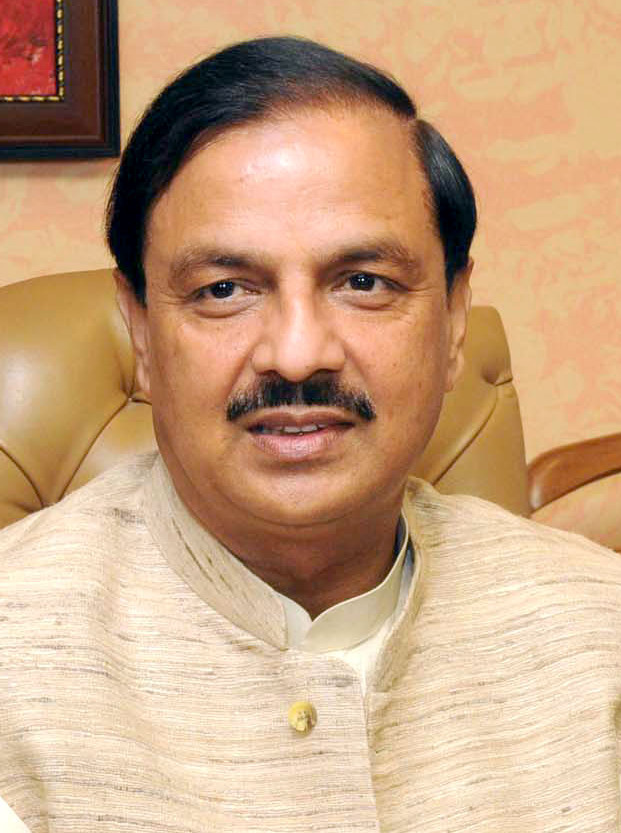
- Incumbent Dr. Mahesh Sharma
- Party: Bharatiya Janata Party
- Elected year: 2024

Gautam Buddha Nagar Lok Sabha constituency (Hindi pronunciation: [gɔːt̪əm bʊd̪d̪ʱ n̪əgəɾ]) is one of the 80 Lok Sabha (parliamentary) constituencies in Uttar Pradesh state in northern India. This constituency, spread over Bulandshahr and Gautam Buddha Nagar districts came into existence in 2008 as a part of the implementation of delimitation of parliamentary constituencies based on the recommendations of the Delimitation Commission of India constituted in 2002.

== Assembly segments ==
Presently, Gautam Buddh Nagar (G. B. Nagar) Lok Sabha constituency comprises five Vidhan Sabha (legislative assembly) segments. Noida, Jewar & Dadri fall under G. B. Nagar district, whereas Sikandrabad and Khurja fall under Bulandshahr district.

| No | Name | District | Member | Party | 2024 Lead |
|---|---|---|---|---|---|
| 61 | Noida | Gautam Buddh Nagar | Pankaj Singh | BJP | BJP |
| 62 | Dadri | Gautam Buddh Nagar | Tejpal Singh Nagar | BJP | BJP |
| 63 | Jewar | Gautam Buddh Nagar | Dhirendra Singh | BJP | BJP |
| 64 | Sikandrabad | Bulandshahr | Lakshmi Raj Singh | BJP | BJP |
| 70 | Khurja (SC) | Bulandshahr | Meenakshi Singh | BJP | BJP |

== Members of Parliament ==
| Year | Member | Party |
|---|---|---|
Till 2008 : See Khurja
| 2009 | Surendra Singh Nagar | Bahujan Samaj Party |
| 2014 | Mahesh Sharma | Bharatiya Janata Party |
| 2019 | Mahesh Sharma | Bharatiya Janata Party |
| 2024 | Mahesh Sharma | Bharatiya Janata Party |

== Election results ==
=== General Election 2024 ===
2024 Indian general election: Gautam Buddh Nagar
| Party | Candidate | Votes | % | ±% |
|---|---|---|---|---|
| BJP | Mahesh Sharma | 857,829 | 59.69 | ▲0.05 |
| SP | Mahendra Singh Nagar | 2,98,357 | 20.76 | ▼5.88 |
| BSP | Rajendra Singh Solanki | 2,51,615 | 17.51 | ▼17.95 |
| NOTA | None of the above | 10,324 | 0.72 | ▲0.44 |
| Majority | | 5,59,472 | 38.92 | ▲14.74 |
| Turnout | | 14,37,244 | 53.73 | ▼6.76 |
| BJP hold | | Swing | | |

=== 2019 ===
2019 Indian general elections: Gautam Buddh Nagar
| Party | Candidate | Votes | % | ±% |
|---|---|---|---|---|
| BJP | Mahesh Sharma | 830,812 | 59.64 | |
| BSP | Satveer Nagar | 4,93,890 | 35.46 | |
| INC | Dr. Arvind Kumar Singh | 42,077 | 3.02 | |
| NOTA | None of the Above | 8,371 | 0.60 | |
| IND | Ashok Kumar Adhana | 3,939 | 0.28 | |
| Majority | | 3,36,922 | 24.18 | |
| Turnout | | 13,93,141 | 60.49 | |
| BJP hold | | Swing | | |

=== 2014 results ===
2014 Indian general elections: Gautam Buddh Nagar
| Party | Candidate | Votes | % | ±% |
|---|---|---|---|---|
| BJP | Dr. Mahesh Sharma | 5,99,702 | 50.00 | +18.92 |
| SP | Narendra Bhati | 3,19,490 | 26.64 | +10.59 |
| BSP | Satish Kumar | 1,98,237 | 16.53 | −16.71 |
| AAP | Kishan Pal Singh | 32,358 | 2.70 | +2.70 |
| INC | Ramesh Chand Tomar | 12,727 | 1.06 | −14.67 |
| NOTA | None of the Above | 3,836 | 0.32 | +0.32 |
| Majority | | 2,80,212 | 23.36 | +21.20 |
| Turnout | | 11,99,365 | 60.39 | +11.84 |
| BJP gain from BSP | | Swing | +16.76 | |

=== 2009 results ===
2009 Indian general elections: Gautam Buddh Nagar
| Party | Candidate | Votes | % | ±% |
|---|---|---|---|---|
| BSP | Surendra Singh Nagar | 2,45,613 | 33.24 | |
| BJP | Dr. Mahesh Sharma | 2,29,709 | 31.08 | |
| SP | Narendra Singh Bhati | 1,18,584 | 16.05 | |
| INC | Ramesh Chandra Tomar | 1,16,230 | 15.73 | |
| NLHP | Dr. Jamal Ahmad Khan | 4,753 | 0.64 | |
| NCP | K. K. Sharma | 2,912 | 0.39 | |
| Majority | | 15,904 | 2.16 | |
| Turnout | | 7,38,984 | 48.54 | |
| BSP win (new seat) | | | | |

== See also ==
- Gautam Buddh Nagar district
- List of constituencies of the Lok Sabha
