= Dadri =

Dadri Greater Noida Dadri
- City
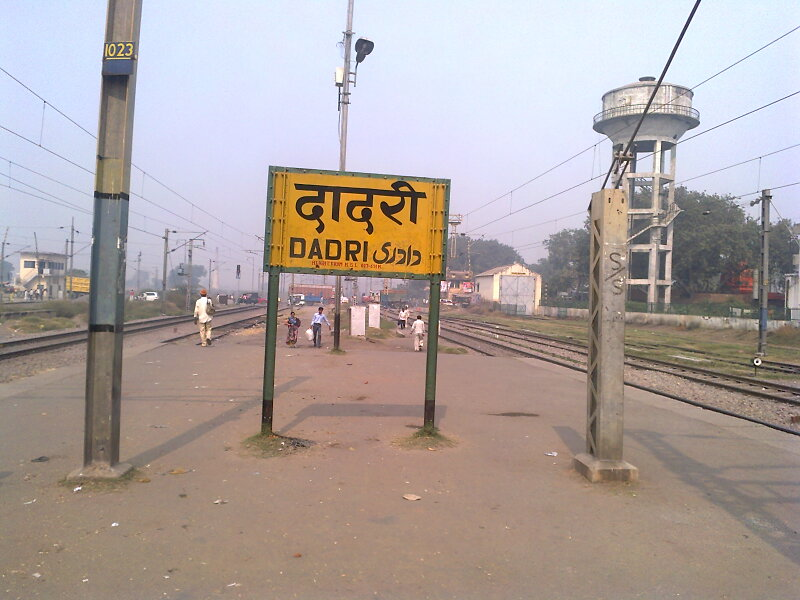

- Location in Uttar Pradesh, India Dadri (India)
- Coordinates: 28.550°N 77.553°E
- Country: India
- State: Uttar Pradesh
- District: Gautam Buddha Nagar District
- Elevation: 216 m (709 ft)

Population (2011)
  - Total: 783,094
  - Male: 427,766
  - Female: 355,328

Language
  - Official: Hindi
  - Additional official: Urdu
- Time zone: UTC+5:30 (IST)
- PIN: 203207
- Vehicle registration: UP-16

Dadri is a city and a municipal board in Gautam Buddha Nagar District in the state of Uttar Pradesh, India. Before the Revolt of 1857, the region was ruled by the Gurjar King Raja Umrao Singh Bhati, who is said to have governed around 108 villages. The Rao family of Dadri continued to hold authority over the area, along with neighbouring territories, until the period leading up to India's independence.

== History ==
Dadri was found by a Gurjara king named Rao Umrao Singh Bhati who fought valiantly against the British in the revolt of 1857.Dadri is located at 28.550°N 77.553°E. It has an average elevation of 216 metres (709 ft).

== Wetlands ==
Large swathes of Dadri have been classified as a wetland and is home to Blackbuck and Nilgai. It is also home to a significant population of migratory birds coming from as far as Siberia and Europe.

== Demographics ==
Religions in Dadri
Religion	Percent
Hindus	64.16%
Muslims	35.22%
Jains	0.5%
Others†	0.5%
Distribution of religions †Includes Sikhs (0.2%), Buddhists (<0.2%).

As of 2001 India census, Dadri had a population of 57,457. Males constitute 54% of the population and females 46%. Dadri has an average literacy rate of 74%, higher than the national average of 59.5%: male literacy is 80% and, female literacy is 68%. In Dadri, 18% of the population is under 5 years of age.

== Villages ==
List of Villages in Dadri Tehsil
SR	Village Name	Tehsil	Population
1	Achheja	Dadri	4876
2	Ajayabpur	Dadri	373
3	Akalpur Jagir	Dadri	1434
4	Amka	Dadri	1176
5	Anandpur	Dadri	1272
6	Badhpura	Dadri	3979
7	Baidpura	Dadri	3260
8	Bairangpur Urf Nai Basti	Dadri	3071
9	Bambawad	Dadri	4850
10	Basantpur Bangar	Dadri	581
11	Beel Akbarpur	Dadri	2194
12	Bhanauta	Dadri	1683
13	Bhogpur	Dadri	1375
14	Bhola Rawal	Dadri	1215
15	Bisahda	Dadri	6669
16	Bisnoli	Dadri	3419
17	Bisrakh Jalalpur	Dadri	5470
18	Chak Senpur Urf Dhanibas	Dadri	1359
19	Chamrawali Bodaki	Dadri	2728
20	Chamrawali Ramgarh	Dadri	1575
21	Chauna	Dadri	2407
22	Chhayansa	Dadri	2641
23	Chholas	Dadri	6192
24	Chipyana Khurd Urf Tigri Jat	Dadri	7889
25	Chithara	Dadri	7656
26	Dabra	Dadri	2393
27	Dadupur Khatana	Dadri	936
28	Datawali	Dadri	2014
29	Daya Nagar	Dadri	537
30	Devla	Dadri	2832
31	Dhoom Manikpur	Dadri	10388
32	Dujana	Dadri	9021
33	Duriyai Jat	Dadri	2846
34	Emnabad	Dadri	1239
35	Fatehpura Rampur	Dadri	1681
36	Ghodi Bachheda	Dadri	7902
37	Girdharpur Sunarasi	Dadri	1719
38	Gulaothi Khurd	Dadri	1469
39	Haibatpur	Dadri	2056
40	Hazratpur	Dadri	136
41	Ibadullapur Urf Badalpur	Dadri	3716
42	Iradatpur Urf Rajatpur	Dadri	790
43	Islamabad Kalda	Dadri	1135
44	Ithaira	Dadri	1903
45	Jaitwapur Navarpur	Dadri	2026
46	Jalpura	Dadri	2996
47	Jarcha	Dadri	9548
48	Jon Samana	Dadri	1571
49	Junpat	Dadri	1967
50	Kachheda Warsabad	Dadri	4855
51	Kaimrala Chakrasenpur	Dadri	3245
52	Kalonda	Dadri	9910
53	Kathhera	Dadri	1667
54	Khairpur Gurjar	Dadri	3684
55	Khandera Girirajpur	Dadri	2359
56	Khangoda	Dadri	2708
57	Khatana Dhirkhera	Dadri	4490
58	Khedi	Dadri	3812
59	Khera Choganpur	Dadri	1937
60	Khodna Kalan	Dadri	3377
61	Khodna Khurd	Dadri	2193
62	Kirachpur Urf Kailashpur	Dadri	2455
63	Kot	Dadri	4244
64	Kudi Khera	Dadri	1978
65	Luharli 139 Basantpur Bangar	Dadri	4389
66	Mahamvad	Dadri	2479
67	Mahiuddin Pur Kanawni	Dadri	7080
68	Mahiuddinpur Urf Garakhpur	Dadri	2
69	Mapcha	Dadri	5656
70	Milak Khandera	Dadri	503
71	Milk Lachchhi	Dadri	2307
72	Muthiyani	Dadri	976
73	Nagla Chamroo	Dadri	1735
74	Nagla Kirani	Dadri	4
75	Nagla Nainsukh	Dadri	1544
76	Noorpur	Dadri	3404
77	Pali	Dadri	3789
78	Palla	Dadri	2592
79	Patwari	Dadri	3745
80	Phoolpur	Dadri	1344
81	Pyawali Tajpur	Dadri	4602
82	Raipur Bangar	Dadri	1796
83	Ranoli Latifpur	Dadri	2878
84	Rasoolpur Dasana	Dadri	1717
85	Rithori	Dadri	2812
86	Roopvas	Dadri	2795
87	Roza Jalalpur	Dadri	4350
88	Roza Yakubpur	Dadri	4275
89	Sadhopur	Dadri	3729
90	Sadipur Chhidoli	Dadri	2748
91	Sadullapur	Dadri	5122
92	Saini	Dadri	4155
93	Saithali	Dadri	3799
94	Salarpur Kalan	Dadri	3022
95	Samauddinpur	Dadri	2080
96	Shah Beri	Dadri	1177
97	Shahpur Khurd	Dadri	1281
98	Sidipur	Dadri	1737
99	Sunpura Sohanpur	Dadri	2672
100	Talabpur Urf Hathipur	Dadri	664
101	Tamolipur	Dadri	47
102	Tatarpur	Dadri	1575
103	Thapkhera	Dadri	1709
104	Tilpata Karanwas	Dadri	8378
105	Tusyana	Dadri	1884
106	Uncha Amirpur	Dadri	3264
107	Uplarasi	Dadri	1388
108	Yusufpur Chak Saberi	Dadri	4715

== Connectivity ==
=== Road ===
Dadri is well connected by roads and highways to Noida, Greater Noida and Dasna. Dadri is situated on old NH-91, which connects Lal Kuan in Ghaziabad with Aligarh via Sikandrabad, Bulandshahr and Khurja.

=== Rail ===
The Dadri railway station is a complex station & yard spread over 6 km on busy route of Delhi–Kanpur section of Indian Railways with connectivity with NTPC Dadri and Container Depot at Tilpata Karanwas.

== Community & Politics ==
Dadri falls under Dadri Assembly constituency represented by an MLA.

Noida, Dadri, Jewar, Khurja and Sikandrabad falls under the Gautam Buddha Nagar Lok Sabha constituency, represented by an MP.

== Educational Institutions ==
- Shiv Nadar University.
- R.V. Northland Educational Institute.
- Mihir Bhoj PG College

== See also ==
- 2015 Dadri mob lynching
- Gautam Buddha Nagar District
