= Sikandrabad Assembly constituency =

Constituency of the Uttar Pradesh legislative assembly in India

Sikandrabad
- Constituency No. 64 for the Uttar Pradesh Legislative Assembly

Constituency details
- Country: India
- Region: North India
- State: Uttar Pradesh
- District: Bulandshahar
- Established: 1956
- Total electors: 338,407 (2012)
- Reservation: None

Member of Legislative Assembly
- 18th Uttar Pradesh Legislative Assembly
- Incumbent Lakshmi Raj Singh
- Party: Bharatiya Janata Party

Sikandrabad Assembly constituency is one of the 403 constituencies of the Uttar Pradesh Legislative Assembly, India. It is a part of the Bulandshahar district and one of the 5 assembly constituencies in the Gautam Buddh Nagar Lok Sabha constituency. First election in this assembly constituency was held in 1957 after the "DPACO (1956)" (delimitation order) was passed in 1956. After the "Delimitation of Parliamentary and Assembly Constituencies Order" was passed in 2008, the constituency was assigned identification number 64.

== Wards / Areas ==
Extent of Sikandrabad Assembly constituency is Sikandrabad Tehsil; PCs Peerbiyavani, Chhapravat, Baral, Sainta, Kurli, Kota, Bhamra, Anchana, Girdharpur Navada, Gulaothi (Dehat), Auladha, Maholi of Agouta KC & Gulaothi MB of Bulandshahr Tehsil.

== Members of the Legislative Assembly ==
Year	Name	Party	Ref
1952	constituency does not exist		
1957	Ram Chandra Vikal	Indian National Congress	
1962	Bansari Das	Indian National Congress	
1967	Ram Chandra Vikal	Independent politician	
1969	Virendra Swarup Bhatnagar	Independent politician	
1974	Virendra Swarup Bhatnagar	Indian National Congress	
1977	Pratap Singh	Janata Party	
1980	Yash Pal Singh	Indian National Congress	
1985	Rajendra Singh Solanki	Indian National Congress	
1989	Narendra Bhati	Janata Dal	
1991	Narendra Bhati	Janata Dal	
1993	Virendra Pal Singh	Bharatiya Janata Party	
1996	Narendra Bhati	Samajwadi Party	
2002	Vedram Bhati	Bahujan Samaj Party	
2007	Vedram Bhati	Bahujan Samaj Party	
2012	Bimla Singh Solanki	Bharatiya Janata Party	
2017	Bimla Singh Solanki	Bharatiya Janata Party	
2022	Lakshmi Raj Singh	Bharatiya Janata Party	

== Election results ==
=== 2027 ===
2027 Uttar Pradesh Legislative Assembly election: Sikandrabad
Party	Candidate	Votes	%	±%
INDIA				
NDA				
BSP				
NOTA	None of the above			
Majority				
Turnout				
gain from		Swing		

=== 2022 ===
2022 Uttar Pradesh Legislative Assembly election: Sikandrabad
Party	Candidate	Votes	%	±%
BJP	Lakshmi Raj Singh	125,644	46.0	+4.34
SP	Rahul Yadav	96,301	35.26	+15.85
BSP	Manveer Gurjar	42,634	15.61	−14.69
NOTA	None of the above	1,195	0.44	+0.03
Majority		29,343	10.74	−0.62
Turnout		273,133	68.33	+1.2
BJP hold		Swing		

=== 2017 ===
2017 Uttar Pradesh Legislative Assembly Election: Sikandrabad
Party	Candidate	Votes	%	±%
BJP	Bimla Singh Solanki	104,956	41.66	
BSP	Mohammad Imran	76,333	30.3	
SP	Rahul Yadav	48,910	19.41	
RLD	Asha Yadav	17,714	7.03	
NOTA	None of the above	1,038	0.41	
Majority		28,623	11.36	
Turnout		251,950	67.13	

=== 2012 ===
2012 General Elections: Sikandrabad
Party	Candidate	Votes	%	±%
BJP	Bimla Singh Solanki	45,799	22.31	−
BSP	Salim Akhtar	45,676	22.25	−
SP	Badrul Islam	43,535	21.2	−
	Remainder 20 candidates	70,310	34.23	−
Majority		123	0.06	−
Turnout		205,320	60.67	−
BJP gain from BSP		Swing		

== See also ==
- Bulandshahar district
- Gautam Buddha Nagar Lok Sabha constituency
- Sixteenth Legislative Assembly of Uttar Pradesh
- Uttar Pradesh Legislative Assembly
