= 2015 Dadri lynching =

Lynching incident in Uttar Pradesh, India

- Dadri (India)
- Location: Bisahda village, Dadri, Uttar Pradesh, India
- Date: 28 September 2015
- Target: Akhlaq family
- Attack type: Lynching
- Deaths: 1 (Mohammad Akhlaq)
- Injuries: 1 (Danish Akhlaq)
- Perpetrator: Cow vigilantes

The 2015 Dadri lynching refers to case of lynching in which a mob of villagers attacked the home of 52 year-old Mohammed Akhlaq, killing him, for suspicion of slaughtering a cow. The attack took place at night, on 28 September 2015 in Bisahda village, near Dadri in Uttar Pradesh, India. The mob consisting of local villagers, attacked Akhlaq's house with sticks, bricks and knives, saying that they suspected of him stealing and slaughtering a cow calf.

Mohammad Akhlaq Saifi (Ikhlaq according to some sources) died in the attack, and his son, 22-year-old Danish, was seriously injured. Later an Indian court found prima facie evidence of meat that may have been either mutton or beef, and ordered registration of a first information report (FIR) against Akhlaq. Then the state government changed the original report and concluded that he was not storing beef for consumption.

== Events ==
=== Background ===
On 28 September 2015 evening, one of Akhlaq's neighbors allegedly accused him of stealing and slaughtering his missing calf at Bisahda village near NTPC Dadri in Uttar Pradesh. Soon a crowd gathered and insisted on searching his house for traces of slaughter which was refused by family. Soon things took an ugly turn when two boys used the local temple's public address system and announced that the family of Akhlaq had killed the cow calf and consumed its meat on Eid-ul-Adha. Cows are considered sacred in Hinduism and in most Indian states including Uttar Pradesh, where killing cows is illegal. The police said that this was the cause of the outrage of citizens.

=== Attack ===
Mob carrying sticks arrived at Akhlaq's house at around 10:30 p.m. (IST) that evening. The family had finished dinner and were about to go to sleep. Akhlaq and his son Danish were already asleep. The mob woke them and accused them of consuming beef. They found some meat in the refrigerator and seized it, but the family insisted it was mutton. However, the mob proceeded to drag the entire family outside; Akhlaq and Danish were repeatedly kicked, hit with bricks and stabbed. The family's neighbours tried to stop the mob but were not able to. The police were called and arrived an hour later. By then, Akhlaq was dead and Danish was badly injured.

The family had been living in the village for about the 70 years. The family consisted of Akhlaq, 52; his brother Jan Mohammad Saifi, 42; mother Asgari Begum, 82; wife Ikram; son Danish, 22; and daughter Sajida. Akhlaq's elder son, Mohammad Sartaj, 27, works as a corporal-ranked technician in the Indian Air Force (IAF) and was in Chennai at the time of attack.

=== Aftermath and arrests ===
The police arrested the temple's priest and his assistant for questioning. An FIR was filed naming ten of the attackers based on the testimony of the family members. It contained charges under Sections 147 (rioting), 148 (rioting with deadly weapon), 149 (unlawful assembly), 302 (murder), 307 (attempt to murder), 458 (house-breaking), and 504 (intentional insult with intent to breach of the peace) of the Indian Penal Code. Six of them were found and arrested by 1 October 2015. On 1 October, the number of arrests went to eight. The arrests were protested by locals. The protesters set fire on vehicles and vandalised shops. The police had to fire in the air to disperse them. One person was injured in the protests. Personnel from Uttar Pradesh Provincial Armed Constabulary and the Rapid Action Force were deployed in the village.

The temple priest denied involvement. He said that he was forced to make the announcement by some youngsters. The priest said that he had only announced that a cow had been killed and asked people to gather near the temple. On 3 October, a man named Vishal Singh Rana, the son of a local Bharatiya Janata Party (BJP) leader Sanjay Rana, was arrested in connection to the case. By 4 October, Danish had spent 4 days in the Intensive Care Unit and undergone two brain surgeries. He had been admitted in Kailash Hospital, Greater Noida, and then to Army Hospital Research and Referral.

Some female relatives of the arrested persons attacked journalists and pelted stones at media vans. They claimed that these persons had been wrongly arrested and the media was covering only the victim's story.

On 5 October, Uttar Pradesh Police asked microblogging site Twitter to remove certain text and photographs related to the incident, which it considered provocative. The victim's family left Bisahda village and moved to an Indian Air Force zone in Delhi on 6 October.

Subsequently, 19 people were charged under the case, including Vishal Singh Rana and Vishal, his friend. 16 of the accused were subsequently invited by Uttar Pradesh's Chief Minister Yogi Adityanath to be present at his election rallies.

== Reactions ==
The lynching was followed by political reactions on all sides, with the BJP trying to distance itself from direct responsibility for the killings, yet at the same time taking advantage of them in some rallies, But BJP accused that parties like the Indian National Congress (INC) and Bahujan Samaj Party (BSP) are trying to gain political mileage from the incident. The then Chief Minister of Uttar Pradesh Akhilesh Yadav announced an ex-gratia of ₹10,00,000 for the family on 30 September 2015. He also directed the District Magistrate and Senior Superintendent of Police (SSP) of Noida Police to provide police protection to the family. On 3 October 2015, the ex-gratia was raised to ₹20,00,000. Akhlaq's elder son Mohammad Sartaj, said that he has decided to move the family out of Dadri. However, fearing for their safety, the family shifted to Delhi on 6 Oct 2015.

The Home Minister and former Chief Minister of Uttar Pradesh, Rajnath Singh, appealed to people to maintain communal harmony and promised strict action against those who try to disrupt it. Finance Minister Arun Jaitley said such incidents affect the image of the nation and people should rise above them. Union Minister Mahesh Sharma said that the incident was not planned but an unfortunate accident. However, he promised justice to the family. Another BJP leader Tarun Vijay said that this incident may derail the Prime Minister Narendra Modi's agenda of development. He asked Hindus to look after cows instead of resorting to violence. He also pointed to the issues of beef export and stray cows consuming plastic from garbage. BJP leader Sakshi Maharaj criticised the exgratia amount and said that if a Hindu had been killed his family would have received much less.

Asaduddin Owaisi, leader of All India Majlis-e-Ittehadul Muslimeen, criticized the police's decision to test the meat, calling this an irrelevance in light of the violent attack. He also criticized the ruling party of the state for inaction and the local BJP leaders for seeking to defending the attackers.

Air Chief Marshal Arup Raha called the incident unfortunate and said that they were trying to move the family to an IAF area to help and protect them. Former Bihar Chief Minister and leader of Rashtriya Janata Dal (RJD) political party Lalu Yadav said that poor people and Indian expatriates eat beef and that there was no biological difference between beef and goat. He added that eating meat and beef was not good for health. However, he later retracted his statements, admitting he had spoken without any thought.

After the murder of Akhlaq, BJP legislator T. Raja Singh posted on Twitter sections from the Hindu text the Vedas that allegedly mandated killing people who slaughter cows. They were subsequently found to be lies.

On 6 October 2015, author Nayantara Sahgal returned her Sahitya Akademi award in protest of the growing intolerance in the country. She pointed to the recent murders of M. M. Kalburgi, Narendra Dabholkar and Govind Pansare, and called the Dadri lynching her last straw. Later, Ashok Vajpeyi and Rahman Abbas also returned their awards.

On 7 October, Azam Khan, a cabinet minister in the Government of Uttar Pradesh, said that he will raise the Dadri lynching issue at United Nations. On 7 October, President of India Pranab Mukherjee said that diversity, tolerance and plurality are the core of Indian civilisation and they kept India united for centuries.

The Prime Minister of India, Narendra Modi, referencing the President's speech, said in a public rally on 8 October to follow the President's message and ignore statements of communal political leaders, urging people to stay united. He stated, "Hindus and Muslims should fight against poverty and not against each other". On October, he termed the incident "dukhad" [saddening]. But he questioned the logic behind blaming the centre for it. Modi also termed undesirable the opposition to Pakistani singer Ghulam Ali's concert in Mumbai by the Shiv Sena, but sought to know how the centre was responsible for it. Modi was criticized for speaking out against the killing ten days after it occurred.

== Request to close all inquiries ==
The relatives of Akhlaq met the Chief Minister Yadav in the first week of December 2015. They expressed satisfaction on the monetary support they received and the progress of the case inquiry. At the same time, they requested him to close all further inquiries into the case.

== FIR against victim and his kin ==
On 9 July 2016, judicial magistrate Vijay Kumar at the Surajpur district court (Greater Noida) issued direction under section 156 (3), on a petition filed by a Bisahda village resident against murdered Akhlaq and his kin. On the night of 28 September 2015 police collected a sample of the meat from Akhlaq's house in Bisahda and sent it to a vet for preliminary testing. These tests suggested it was mutton, but the Uttar Pradesh Police sent the sample to another lab in Mathura for a conclusive test, as per which meat was beef.

== Move to withdraw case ==
On 15 October 2025, the government filed a withdrawal application in the court citing inconsistent statements by Mohammad Akhlaq’s kin in naming the accused; the fact that no firearm or sharp weapon was recovered from the accused, and the lack of any enmity or hostility recorded between the accused and the victim.

== See also ==
- Cow-based lynching
- Cattle in religion
- Victim blaming
- 2017 Alwar lynching
- The Brotherhood (2017 film) - Documentary about the lynching
