= Dankaur =

- Town
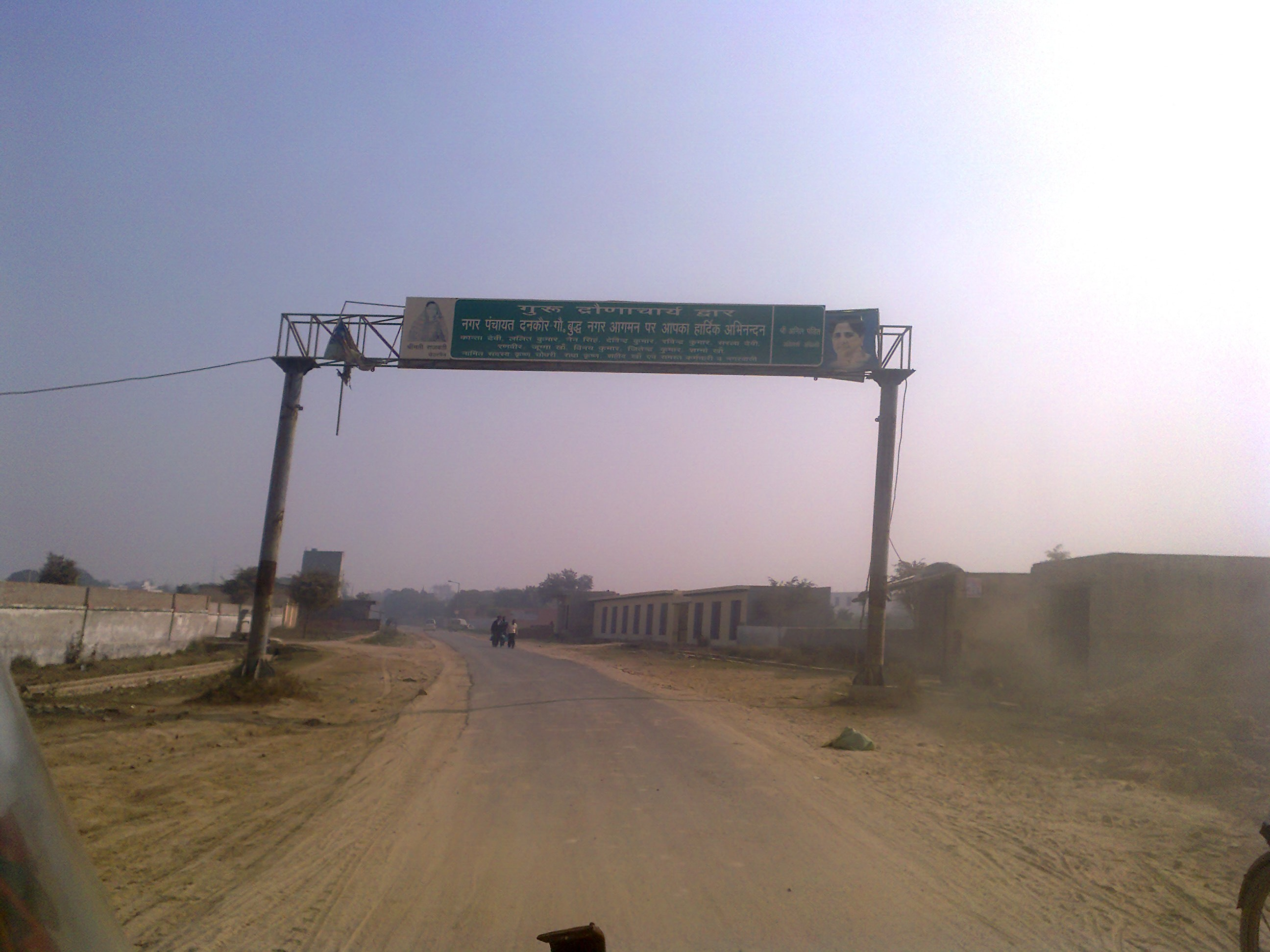
- West entrance of Dankaur

- Location in Uttar Pradesh, India Dankaur (India)
- Coordinates: 28.35°N 77.55°E
- Country: India
- State: Uttar Pradesh
- District: Gautam Buddha Nagar
- Elevation: 194 m (636 ft)

Population (2001)
  - Total: 11,982

Language
  - Official: Hindi
  - Additional official: Urdu
- Time zone: UTC+5:30 (IST)
- PIN: 203201
- Vehicle registration: UP-16

Dankaur is a town and a nagar panchayat in Gautam Buddha Nagar district in the Indian state of Uttar Pradesh. It is situated on Yamuna Expressway, south of Greater Noida.

== History ==
Before 1997, Dankaur and Jewar were parts of the Bulandshahr district.

== Geography ==
Dankaur is located on 28.35°N 77.55°E. It has an average elevation of 194 metres (636 feet). It is situated approximately 55 kilometres east of Delhi along the bank of river Yamuna.

Dankaur is also home to Dhanauri Wetlands, place for Sarus Crane.

== Demographics ==
As of 2011 India census, Dankaur had a population of 13,520. Males constitute 54% of the population and females 46%. Dankaur has an average literacy rate of 57%, lower than the national average of 59.5%: male literacy is 67% and, female literacy is 47%.

== Connectivity ==
=== Road ===
Dankaur is well connected by road to Greater Noida, Jewar, Sikandrabad and Tappal. It is situated opposite to F1 race circuit on Yamuna Expressway. The Eastern Peripheral Expressway (EPE) also crosses nearby.

=== Rail ===
Dankaur railway station is situated between Ghaziabad Junction and Aligarh Junction on Delhi-Kanpur section of Indian railways. The physical location of Dankaur station is at Shyam Nagar Mandi on Dankaur-Sikandrabad road.

== Politics ==
Dankaur is part of the Jewar Assembly constituency, represented by a MLA.

== See also ==
- Mirzapur and Nilonip Shahpur
- Galgotias University
