= Vedram Bhati =

Indian politician

Member (MLA) in Uttar Pradesh Legislative Assembly
- In office Mar 2012 – Mar 2017
- Preceded by: Horam Singh
- Succeeded by: Dhirendra Singh
- Constituency: Jewar
- In office 2002–2012
- Preceded by: Narendra Bhati
- Succeeded by: Bimla Singh Solanki
- Constituency: Sikandrabad

Personal details
- Born: 4 September 1951 (age 75) Gautam Budh Nagar district
- Party: BJP
- Spouse: Rajwati
- Children: 3 (2 sons & 1 daughter)
- Parent: Ramfal Singh (father)
- Education: Chaudhary Charan Singh University
- Profession: Farmer, politician & businessman

Vedram Bhati (born 1951) is an Indian politician and a member of the 16th Legislative Assembly of Uttar Pradesh of India. A notable Gujjar leader from Uttar Pradesh, he represents the Jewar constituency of Uttar Pradesh and was a member of the Bahujan Samaj Party (BSP) from 2002 to 2019 and later joined the Bharatiya Janata Party.

== Early life and education ==
Vedram Bhati was born in Gautam Budh Nagar district. He attended the Chaudhary Charan Singh University and attained Bachelor of Laws degree.

== Political career ==
Vedram Bhati has been a MLA for three terms. He represented the Jewar constituency in the 16th Legislative Assembly of Uttar Pradesh and is a member of the Bahujan Samaj Party political party.

== Positions held ==
#	From	To	Position	Party
1.	2002	2007	MLA of Sikandrabad in 14th Vidhan Sabha	BSP
2.	2007	2012	MLA of Sikandrabad in 15th Vidhan Sabha	BSP
3.	2012	2017	MLA of Jewar in 16th Vidhan Sabha	BSP

== See also ==
- Jewar
- Sixteenth Legislative Assembly of Uttar Pradesh
- Uttar Pradesh Legislative Assembly
