= Satveer Singh Gurjar =

Indian politician

Satveer Singh Gurjar सतवीर सिंह गुर्जर

Personal details
- Born: 13 September 1962 (age 64) Gautam Budh Nagar district
- Party: Bahujan Samaj Party
- Spouse: Sudesh (wife)
- Children: 1 son and 3 daughters
- Parent: Ratiram Singh (father)
- Education: S. K. Inter College
- Profession: Farmer & politician

Satveer Singh Gurjar (Hindi: सतवीर सिंह गुर्जर) is an Indian politician and a member of the 16th Legislative Assembly of India. He represents the Dadri constituency of Uttar Pradesh and is a member of the Bahujan Samaj Party political party.

== Early life and education ==
Satveer Singh Gurjar was born in a Gurjar family of Village Barola Gautam Budhha Nagar district within the National Capital Region, India. He attended the S. K. Inter College and is educated till tenth grade.

== Political career ==
Satveer Singh Gurjar has been an MLA for two terms. He represented the Dadri constituency and is a member of the Bahujan Samaj Party political party.

== Posts held ==
| # | From | To | Position | Comments |
|---|---|---|---|---|
| 01 | 2007 | 2012 | Member, 15th Legislative Assembly | |
| 02 | 2012 | Mar-2017 | Member, 16th Legislative Assembly | |

== See also ==
- Sixteenth Legislative Assembly of Uttar Pradesh
- Uttar Pradesh Legislative Assembly
