= Noida International Airport =

International airport in Uttar Pradesh, India

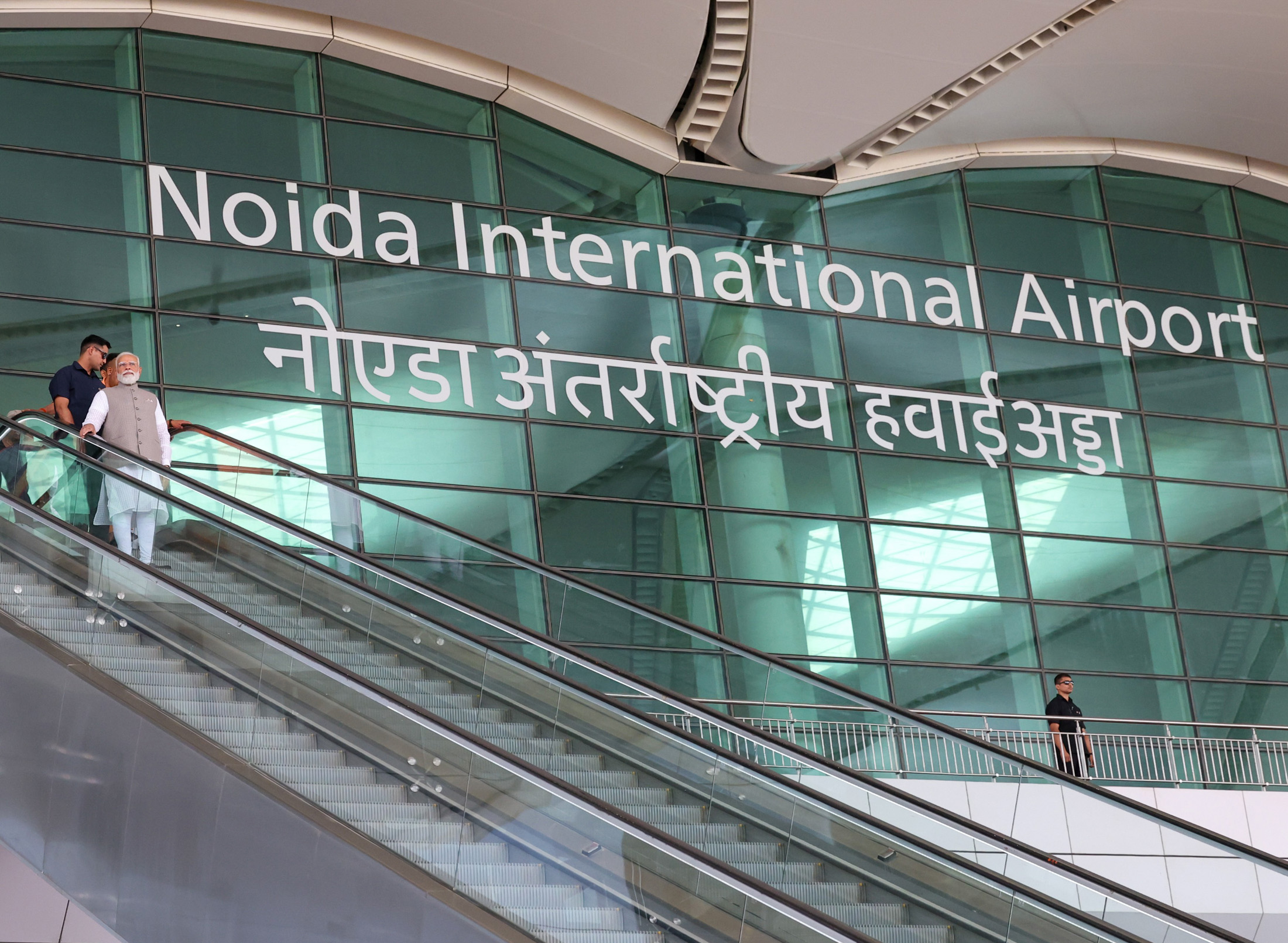
- IATA: DXN; ICAO: VIND

Summary
- Airport type: Public
- Owner: Noida International Airport Limited (NIAL)
- Operator: Yamuna International Airport Private Limited (YIAPL) (subsidiary of Zurich Airport International AG)
- Serves: National Capital Region
- Location: Jewar, Gautam Buddha Nagar district, Uttar Pradesh, India
- Opened: 15 June 2026; 4 months ago
- Coordinates: 28°10′12″N 077°36′36″E
- Website: www.niairport.in

Map
- Location of airport in Uttar Pradesh DXN/VIND (India)

Runways
| Direction | Length | | Surface |
| Direction | m | ft | Surface |
|---|---|---|---|
| 10/28 | 3,900 | 12,795 | Asphalt/Concrete |

Noida International Airport (IATA: DXN, ICAO: VIND), also called Jewar Airport, is an international airport at Jewar in the Gautam Buddha Nagar district of Uttar Pradesh, India, serving the National Capital Region and western Uttar Pradesh. In its first phase, the airport has one runway and one passenger terminal with a capacity of 12 million passengers annually. The airport will increase this capacity to 30 million passengers annually in the upcoming years. The airport is intended to complement Indira Gandhi International Airport as part of the Delhi-NCR region's dual-airport system.

The first phase was inaugurated on 28 March 2026, following the grant of an aerodrome licence by the DGCA on 6 March 2026. Commercial operations began on 15 June 2026.

On 9 October 2026, the Cabinet of Uttar Pradesh approved a proposal to rename the airport Narendra Modi International Airport after Prime Minister Narendra Modi.

== History ==
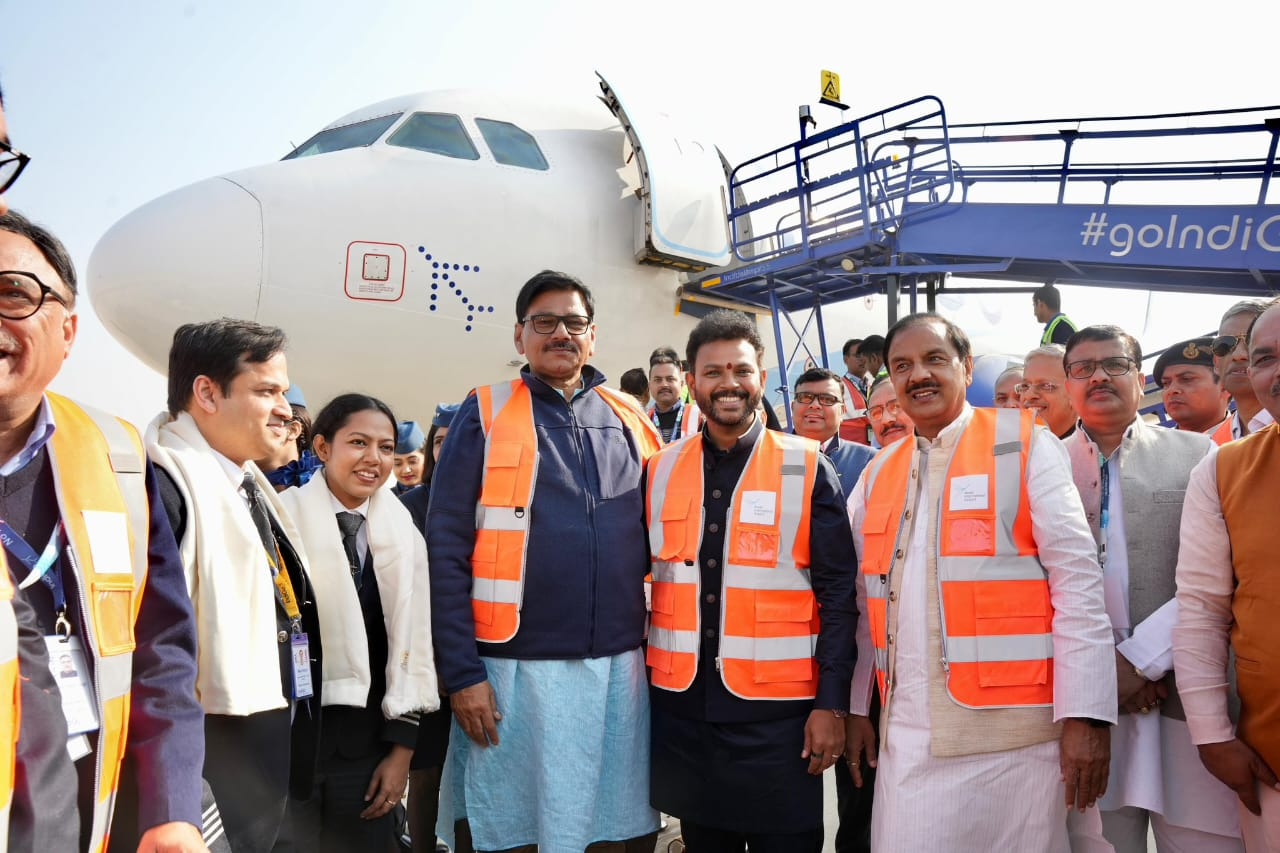
Minister of Civil Aviation K. Ram Mohan Naidu after the first test flight on 9 December 2024

Noida International Airport was originally proposed in 2001 as the greenfield Taj International Aviation Hub by then Uttar Pradesh Chief Minister Rajnath Singh. The project subsequently saw repeated delays, changes in location and political reversals. Initially planned near Greater Noida, it was held up partly because of its proximity to Delhi's IGI Airport and the right of first refusal attached to Delhi airport's concession. The project was briefly considered for Agra under the Samajwadi Party-led government, but was eventually revived and moved back to Jewar in 2014.

=== Summary of phases ===
The Yamuna Expressway Industrial Development Authority's (YEIDA) currently published table describes the airport's long-term build-out as:

- Phase I: 12 MPPA (million passengers per annum), ₹4,588 crore cost, FY23-FY27 operation period.
- Phase II: 30 MPPA, ₹5,983 crore cost, FY31-FY32 operation period.
- Phase III: 50 MPPA, ₹8,415 crore cost, FY36-FY37 operation period.
- Phase IV: 70 MPPA, ₹10,575 crore cost, FY40-FY50 operation period.
- Total: ₹29,561 crore.

=== Phase 1 ===
The Union Government approved the airport project in June 2017 and the Ministry of Civil Aviation gave in-principle approval to the Uttar Pradesh government to build the airport in May 2018.

The airport is being developed under a public–private partnership model. Zurich Airport International, a subsidiary of Flughafen Zürich AG, won the bid to develop and operate the airport in November 2019, and the concession agreement was signed on 7 October 2020 for a 40 year period. It is being implemented on a DBFOT (design, build, finance, operate and transfer) basis, with the concession running from 2021 to 2061.

The foundation stone of the airport was laid on 25 November 2021. In June 2022, Tata Projects was awarded the civil construction contract for the first phase.

In September 2023, the International Air Transport Association assigned the airport the IATA code DXN. In November 2023, the airport signed a memorandum of understanding with IndiGo to become its launch carrier, and in January 2024 it entered a strategic collaboration with Akasa Air.

In October 2024, the airport completed calibration of its instrument landing system and precision approach path indicator, and in December 2024 an IndiGo validation flight tested its approach procedures, navigational aids and air traffic control systems.

Originally slated for opening in 2022, delays repeatedly pushed back the start of commercial operations. On 6 March 2026, the airport received its aerodrome licence by the Directorate General of Civil Aviation. Phase I was inaugurated on 28 March 2026. Scheduled commercial flights were initially expected to begin in mid-April to May 2026, following the inauguration. The airport commenced flight operations on 15 June 2026, with an IndiGo flight landing from Lucknow.

On 9 October 2026 Chief Minister of Uttar Pradesh Yogi Adityanath announced that the airport will be named Narendra Modi International Airport.

=== Later phases ===
Noida International Airport is described as a four-phase project with an initial capacity of 12 million passengers annually in Phase I with scalability to 70 million passengers annually with its full development. The YEIDA's project page however describes a broader long-term concept, including a six-runway end state.

Phase I covers the initial single-runway layout while Phase II builds on this with expanded terminal, apron, cargo and support facilities. Phase III will introduce a second 4,150 m runway, Terminal 2 and a Ground Transportation Centre. Phase IV is projected to handle 489,700 aircraft movements a year with 186 apron stands.

== Design and architecture ==
The passenger terminal was designed by a consortium of Grimshaw, Nordic - Office of Architecture, Haptic and STUP, selected in 2020 through a three-stage design competition organised by Zurich Airport International.

The terminal includes green spaces inside and around the building, including a landscaped courtyard deep within the terminal plan intended to improve daylight, ventilation and the passenger experience.

The project was designed to achieve LEED Gold certification and carbon net zero operation. In 2022, the terminal design won the Architectural Review Future Projects Award in the Infrastructure category.

The architecture is described as drawing inspiration from Indian heritage, with design elements reminiscent of traditional ghats and havelis.

== Facilities ==
The airport has a runway designated 10/28 measuring 3,900 by 45 metres, supported by an instrument landing system and aeronautical ground lighting for 24-hour operations. The airport has parking stands for 24 Code C and two Code D/F aircraft and is equipped with ARFF Category 9 facilities.

The phase 1 passenger terminal (T1) has an area of 101,590 square metres, with 28 apron stands. In October 2025, officials said the runway, air traffic control tower, boarding bridges, e-gates, baggage handling systems and security scanners had been installed, while major works including taxiways, internal roads, firefighting systems, fuel facilities and security infrastructure were complete.

=== Cargo ===
The airport includes a dedicated cargo component and is being developed with a multi-modal cargo hub. The hub is designed to handle over 250,000 metric tonnes annually in its initial phase and is expandable to around 1.8 million metric tonnes. In February 2023, Noida International Airport selected Air India SATS (AISATS) to develop the cargo hub, including an integrated cargo terminal and warehousing and logistics facilities.

=== Operations ===
By early 2025, the airport had awarded a number of operational and commercial concessions. These included ground handling to Bird Group, retail and duty-free concessions to a consortium of Heinemann Asia Pacific and BWC Forwarders, lounge and food-and-beverage concessions to Travel Food Services, and technology operations to Kyndryl.

The airport has a 40 acre aircraft maintenance facility. In March 2026, Akasa Air announced plans to establish its first maintenance, repair and overhaul (MRO) facility at the airport.

=== Sustainability ===
The airport operator describes the project as aiming for carbon net-zero operations through energy-efficient systems and environmentally responsible practices. In April 2024, Bird Group said all ground service equipment used under its ground-handling agreement would be electric-powered. In September 2024, the airport partnered with Statiq to provide airside EV charging infrastructure. In November 2024, Tata Power announced agreements to supply wind and solar power for the airport. In February 2025, Indraprastha Gas announced plans to establish CNG stations and develop pipeline infrastructure at the site.

== Connectivity ==
As of April 2026, the airport's initial access arrangements remained primarily road-based. According to the Prime Minister's Office, Noida International Airport is planned as a multi-modal transport hub with integration across road, rail, metro and regional transit systems.

=== Ground Transportation Centre ===
The Ground Transportation Centre (GTC), a 20-acre facility located between Terminal 1 and the future Terminal 2, is intended to serve as the airport's main surface-transport hub. In its first phase, it is designed to accommodate cabs, taxis and buses within walking distance of the passenger terminal. Later phases are planned to include underground metro and Namo Bharat stations, with retail outlets, restaurants and lounges at concourse level.

=== Buses and ride-hailing ===
The airport operator has signed bus-connectivity partnerships with the Uttarakhand Transport Corporation (UTC), Haryana Roadways and the Uttar Pradesh State Road Transport Corporation (UPSRTC). According to the operator, these partnerships are intended to connect the airport from the commencement of commercial operations with destinations including Dehradun, Rishikesh, Haridwar and Haldwani in Uttarakhand; Palwal, Faridabad, Gurgaon, Kurukshetra, Chandigarh, Hisar, Narnaul, Panipat and Ambala in Haryana; and Noida, Greater Noida, Ghaziabad, Bulandshahr, Agra, Aligarh, Mathura, Vrindavan, Hathras and other cities in Uttar Pradesh.

In May 2025, the airport also announced a partnership with Uber for last mile travel from the airport, including dedicated pick-up zones, on-ground assistance and wayfinding support. In December 2024, it separately announced a partnership with Mahindra Logistics Mobility to provide an all-electric taxi fleet from the terminal kerbside.

=== Road ===
The airport's principal road access is via the Yamuna Expressway. Regional road access is also provided through NH 44 and NH 34.

A major planned road project is the greenfield connectivity corridor from the Delhi-Faridabad-Ballabhgarh-Sohna spur of the Delhi–Mumbai Expressway to the airport. In March 2026, the Cabinet Committee on Economic Affairs approved the revised cost estimate for this 31.42 km project corridor, of which about 11 km is to be developed as elevated highway. The corridor would improve direct connectivity from South Delhi, Faridabad and Gurugram to the airport and would intersect the Eastern Peripheral Expressway, the Yamuna Expressway and the Dedicated Freight Corridor.

In October 2025, YEIDA had approved a ₹1,700 crore, 25 km eastern-side access road from Greater Noida West near Char Murti to the airport, intended to improve access from Greater Noida West and Ghaziabad.

=== Railway ===
==== Metro ====
- Greater Noida–Noida Airport Metro (planned): an extension from the existing Noida Aqua Line towards Noida International Airport.
- Ballabhgarh–Noida Airport Metro (proposed): an extension from the Delhi Metro Violet Line via Palwal to Jewar airport.

==== Semi-high-speed rail ====
- Ghaziabad–Jewar RRTS (planned): a 71.1 km rapid rail corridor with 11 stations, to be developed in two phases.
- Palwal–Noida International Airport–Khurja Railway (PNAKR line, proposed): a 61 km rail link proposed to connect the airport with Palwal and Khurja.
- Noida International Airport–Chola Railway (proposed): a branch connection from the PNAKR line to the existing Chola station on the Howrah–Delhi main line.
- Hisar Airport–Noida International Airport railway line (proposed): connection linking Noida Airport with IGI Airport and Hisar Airport.

==== High-speed rail ====
- Delhi-Noida-Varanasi HSR (planned): Noida Airport is a proposed station on the Delhi–Varanasi high-speed rail project.

== Issues ==
=== Connectivity ===
Reaching the airport from central Delhi and Noida has remained a recurring concern in local coverage because of its distance from the core urban area and the fact that rail-based links are still at the planning stage. At the time of inauguration, access planning focused mainly on buses, taxis and road shuttles.

=== Ecological threats ===
Environmentalists and local officials have raised concerns over protection of the nearby Dhanauri wetlands, which lies around 15 km from the airport and had not received wetland protection status as of early 2024.

=== Resettlement and compensation ===
Land acquisition and rehabilitation have remained contentious during multiple phases of the project. In 2023, district authorities finalised a rehabilitation and resettlement scheme for families displaced by second-phase land acquisition. In March 2026, some displaced farmers said promised jobs and rehabilitation measures had still not been fully implemented.

== Airlines and destinations ==
| Airlines | Destinations |
|---|---|
| Akasa Air | Bengaluru,Kolkata, Mumbai, Navi Mumbai |
| IndiGo | Amritsar, Bareilly, Bengaluru, Bhopal, Chandigarh, Dehradun, Dharamshala, Hyderabad, Jaipur, Jammu, Jodhpur, Kishangarh, Lucknow, Mumbai, Navi Mumbai, Pantnagar, Srinagar, Udaipur |

== See also ==
- Transport in Delhi
- NCR Delhi Transport Plan
- List of airports in India
- List of Indian Air Force stations
