= Jewar =

- Town
- Location in Uttar Pradesh, India Jewar (India)
- Coordinates: 28.13°N 77.55°E
- Country: India
- State: Uttar Pradesh
- District: Gautam Buddha Nagar
- Elevation: 195 m (640 ft)

Population (2011)
  - Total: 32,269

Language
  - Official: Hindi
  - Additional official: Urdu
- Time zone: UTC+5:30 (IST)
- PIN: 203135
- Telephone code: 05738
- Vehicle registration: UP-16
- Website: www.gbnagar.nic.in

Jewar (elevation 195 metres (640 ft), 28.13° north latitude and 77.55° east longitude) is a town, nagar panchayat, and sub-division in Gautam Buddha Nagar district (GB Nagar) in NCR in the Indian state of Uttar Pradesh. It is located on the northeast bank of the Yamuna River about 40 km (25 mi) from the district headquarters Greater Noida, about 60 km (37 mi) from Noida, 33 km (21 mi) from Gautam Buddha University and 35 km (22 mi) from Khair.

== Background ==
=== Etymology ===
Jewar, originally named "Jabalipur" after the Jabali - a Hindu maharishi (sage), and got corrupted to the current name.

=== History ===
Jewar has Painted Grey Ware culture, usually associated with the vedic era, archaeological site. According to the folklore, the Bisrakh village nearby had the ashram of Ravana's father, Vishrava; and Dankaur had the ashram of Dronacharya (Pandava's and Ekalavya's guru). People of the area participated in 1857 India's war of independence. Indian freedom fighter Ram Prasad Bismil stayed in the area after the "Mainpuri Conspiracy of 1918" and Bhagat Singh stayed at Nalgadha while experimenting with bomb making.

Before 1997, Jewar and Dankaur were parts of the Bulandshahr district. At present, Jewar and Dankaur along with Dadri and Bisrakh (earlier parts of Ghaziabad district) are parts of Gautam Buddha Nagar district.

== Administration ==
Jewar, along with Noida and Dadri, is one of the 3 sub-divisions of GB Nagar district, each headed by a SDM.

Jewar falls under Jewar Assembly constituency represented by a MLA.

Noida, Dadri, Jewar, Khurja and Sikandrabad falls under the Gautam Buddha Nagar Lok Sabha constituency, represented by an MP.

== People ==
=== Demographics ===
As of 2011 Indian Census, Jewar had a total population of 32,269, of which 17,188 were males and 15,081 were females. Population within the age group of 0 to 6 years was 5,095. The total number of literates in Jewar was 18,184, which constituted 56.4% of the population with male literacy of 63.8% and female literacy of 47.9%. The effective literacy rate of 7+ population of Jewar was 66.9%, of which male literacy rate was 75.9% and female literacy rate was 56.7%. The Scheduled Castes population was 7,087. Jewar had 4623 households in 2011.

=== Culture ===
Around 1 km west of Jewar is an ashram and an old temple of the Maharshi. Other temples in the town is the Devi Mandir and the Daau ji Mandir famous for the Dau ji Mela held every year in the month of September.

== Transport ==
=== Air ===
Noida International Airport (IATA: DXN, ICAO: VIND), on Yamuna Expressway around 7 km north of Jewarcity centre, connects Delhi NCR with other international cities.

=== Railways ===
Jewar town does not have any railway station. The nearest railway stations are Khurja Junction, Chola and Dankaur on Delhi-Kanpur section of Indian railways. On the west side of Jewar is Palwal in Haryana state. The Palwal railway station which is situated on the Delhi-Agra chord is around 28 km from Jewar.

In 2023, the Government of India started planning to construct a new railway line from Chola station to Palwal station, via Jewar.

=== Roadways ===
Jewar is situated on Yamuna Expressway which connects Greater Noida with Agra via Dankaur, Bajna and Raya. It is also connected by NH-334D which connects Aligarh and Palwal via Khair, Tappal and Hamidpur.

Major District Road (MDR) and other highway connects Jewar with Khurja, Bulandshahr, Sikandrabad and Dadri.

== See also ==
- List of cities in Uttar Pradesh by population
