= Dadri, Uttar Pradesh Assembly constituency =

Constituency of the Uttar Pradesh legislative assembly in India

Dadri
- Constituency No. 62 for the Uttar Pradesh Legislative Assembly

Constituency details
- Country: India
- Region: North India
- State: Uttar Pradesh
- District: Gautam Budh Nagar
- Total electors: 441,229 (2017)
- Reservation: None

Member of Legislative Assembly
- 18th Uttar Pradesh Legislative Assembly
- Incumbent Tejpal Singh Nagar
- Party: Bharatiya Janata Party
- Elected year: 2022

Dadri Assembly constituency is one of the 403 constituencies of the Uttar Pradesh Legislative Assembly, India. It is a part of the Gautam Budh Nagar district and one of the five assembly constituencies in the Gautam Buddh Nagar Lok Sabha constituency. It includes some parts of Greater Noida. First election in this assembly constituency was held in 1957 after the "DPACO (1956)" (delimitation order) was passed in 1956. After the "Delimitation of Parliamentary and Assembly Constituencies Order, 2008" was passed in 2008, the constituency was assigned identification number 62. The 2022 Assembly Elections in the Constituency are scheduled for 10 February 2022.

== Area/wards ==
The Dadri Assembly constituency comprises Dadri; Kacheda Warsabad, Kamnagar (Kambuxpur), Bisrakh Jalalpur, Patwari, Chipiyana Bujurg, Chhapraula, Roza Yakubpur, Haibatpur, Khodana Kalan, Saini, Khedi, Khairpur Gujar, Achheja of Bisrakh block and Dadri MB of Dadri Tehsil; Surajpur (Greater Noida).

== Members of the Legislative Assembly ==
Year	Member	Party
1957	Satyawati	Indian National Congress
1962	Ram Chandra Vikal	Indian National Congress
1967	Tej Singh	Indian National Congress
1969	Ram Chandra Vikal	U.P. Kisan Mazdoor Party
1972^	Vijay Pal Singh	Indian National Congress
1974	Tej Singh	Indian National Congress (O)
1977	Tej Singh	Janata Party
1980	Vijay Pal Singh	Indian National Congress (I)
1985	Mahendra Singh Bhati	Lokdal
1989	Mahendra Singh Bhati	Janata Dal
1991	Mahendra Singh Bhati	Janata Dal
1993	Sameer Mahendra Bhati	Janata Dal
1996	Nawab Singh Nagar	Bharatiya Janata Party
2002	Nawab Singh Nagar	Bharatiya Janata Party
2007	Satveer Singh Gurjar	Bahujan Samaj Party
2012	Satveer Singh Gurjar	Bahujan Samaj Party
2017	Tejpal Singh Nagar	Bharatiya Janata Party
2022	Tejpal Singh Nagar	Bharatiya Janata Party

== Election results ==
=== 2027 ===
2027 Uttar Pradesh Legislative Assembly election: Dadri
Party	Candidate	Votes	%	±%
INDIA				
NDA				
BSP				
NOTA	None of the above			
Majority				
Turnout				
gain from		Swing		

=== 2022 ===
2022 Uttar Pradesh Legislative Assembly election: Dadri
Party	Candidate	Votes	%	±%
BJP	Tejpal Singh Nagar	218,068	61.64	+8.4
SP	Rajkumar Bhati	79,850	22.57	
BSP	Manbir Singh	40,456	11.44	−11.57
INC	Deepak Kumar Bhati	5,392	1.52	−13.55
AAP	Sanjay Chechi	4,620	1.31	
NOTA	None of the above	2,033	0.57	−0.06
Majority		138,218	39.07	+8.84
Turnout		353,777	58.35	−1.77
BJP hold		Swing		

=== 2017 ===
2017 Uttar Pradesh Legislative Assembly election: Dadri
Party	Candidate	Votes	%	±%
BJP	Tejpal Singh Nagar	141,226	53.24	
BSP	Satveer Singh Gurjar	61,049	23.01	
INC	Sameer Bhati	39,975	15.07	
RLD	Ravindra Bhati	10,373	3.91	
Rashtravadi Pratap Sena	Ramesh Singh Rawal	3,835	1.45	
NOTA	None of the above	1,665	0.63	
Majority		80,177	30.23	
Turnout		265,281	60.12	
BJP gain from BSP		Swing		

=== 2012 ===
2012 Uttar Pradesh Legislative Assembly election: Dadri
Party	Candidate	Votes	%	±%
BSP	Satveer Singh Gurjar	81,137	40.68	−
BJP	Nawab Singh Nagar	43,840	21.98	−
INC	Sameer Bhati	37,764	18.94	−
SP	Rajkumar Bhati	23,191	11.63	−
IND.	Pitamber Sharma	5,605	2.81	−
Majority		37,297	18.7	−
Turnout		1,99,436	58.03	
BSP hold		Swing		

== See also ==
- Gautam Buddha Nagar Lok Sabha constituency
- Gautam Budh Nagar district
- Sixteenth Legislative Assembly of Uttar Pradesh
- Uttar Pradesh Legislative Assembly
