= Lakshmi Raj Singh =

Indian politician

Lakshmi Raj Singh is an Indian politician who is serving as Member of 18th Uttar Pradesh Legislative Assembly (MLA) from Sikandrabad Assembly constituency. In 2022 Uttar Pradesh Legislative Assembly election, he won with 1,25,644 votes.
