= Dhirendra Singh =

Indian politician

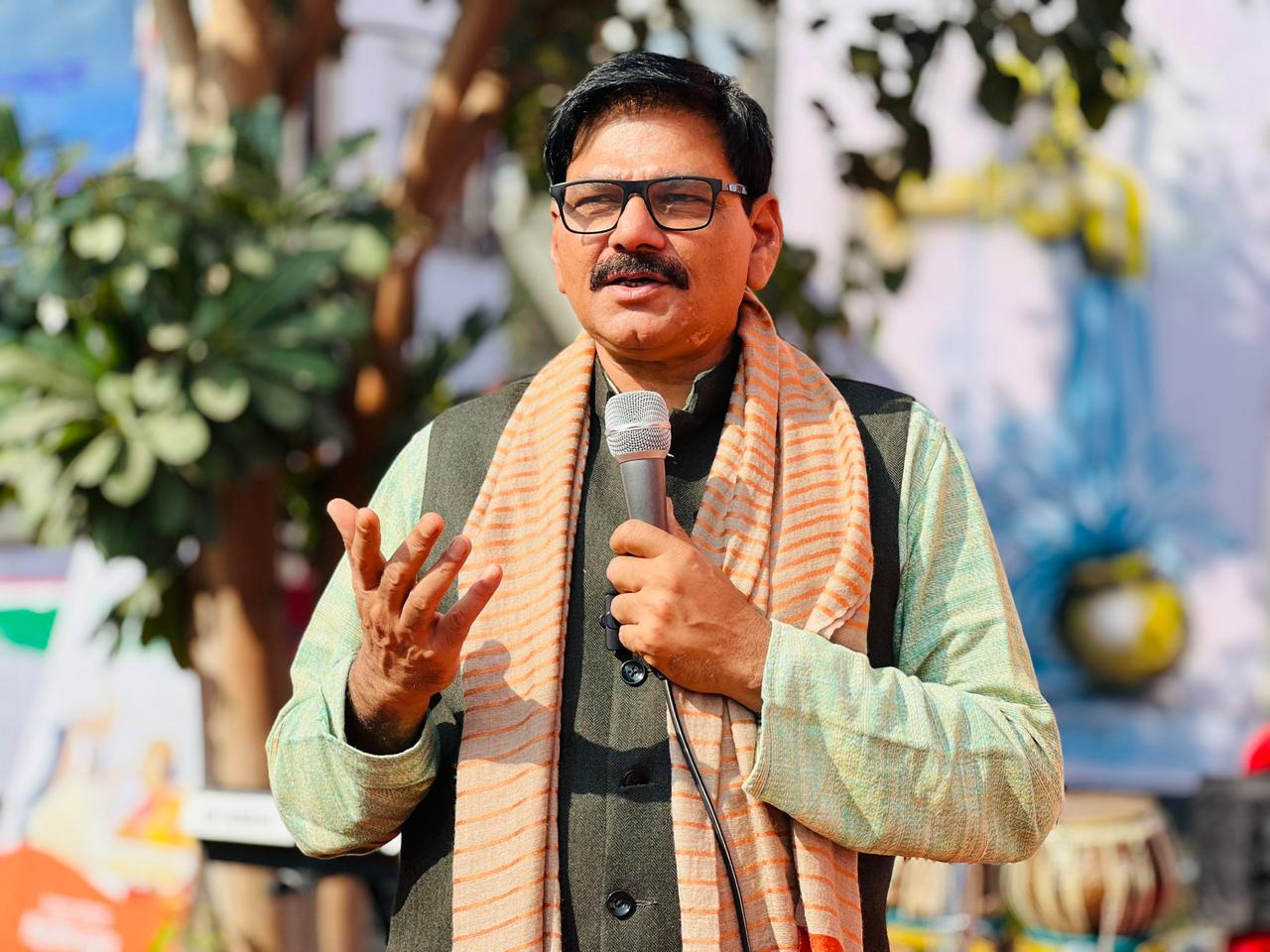

Member (MLA) of Uttar Pradesh Legislative Assembly
- Incumbent
- Assumed office 11 March 2017
- Leader: Yogi Adityanath
- Preceded by: Vedram Bhati
- Constituency: Jewar (63)

Personal details
- Born: 1 November 1966 (age 59) Rabupura, Uttar Pradesh, India
- Party: Bharatiya Janata Party
- Other political affiliations: Indian National Congress (till 2016)
- Spouse: Usha Singh (m. 1993)
- Children: 2
- Education: St. John's College, Agra

Dhirendra Singh (born 1 November 1966) is an Indian politician and a member (MLA) of the Uttar Pradesh Legislative Assembly since 2017. He represents the Jewar assembly constituency in Gautam Buddha Nagar district of Uttar Pradesh and is a member of the Bharatiya Janata Party (BJP).

== Early and personal life ==
Dhirendra Singh was born in Rabupura town of Gautam Budh Nagar district in a Rajput family to father Hari Singh who was also MLA from Jewar Vidhan Sabha in 1980 and mother Shanti Chauhan. He attended the Chaudhary Charan Singh University and attained a Master of Arts (MA) degree in History. He is an alumnus of St. John's College, Agra.

He married Usha Singh on 17 January 1993. The couple has two children, a son and a daughter.

== Political career ==
=== 2001-2017 ===
Singh started his political life as a student leader at St. John's College, Agra. He was elected Chairman of Rabupura, Gautam Buddha Nagar in the year 2001. He became a member of the Indian National Congress (INC) and served on several positions including the State Spokesperson of the congress party for Uttar Pradesh.

He took active role during the farmers movement of Bhatta-Parsaul (under Jewar assembly constituency) and came to limelight during the land acquisition movement of Bhatta-Parsaul when he took the Congress vice-president Rahul Gandhi to the village on his bike, and led a massive protest. Dhirendra Singh raised a big movement to change the law for land acquisition in India and is credited with helping shape the Land Acquisition Act, 2013. He was the INC's candidate in UP assembly election 2012 but lost the seat by 9,500 votes.

=== 2017-Present ===
Later Singh left the INC party and joined Bharatiya Janata Party (BJP) before the assembly polls of 2017 and got elected as the member (MLA) of the Uttar Pradesh Legislative Assembly from Jewar seat for the first time. In 2017 election, he had defeated 3-times MLA Vedram Bhati of Bahujan Samaj Party (BSP).

Singh has contested for the 16th, 17th and 18th Legislative Assembly for the third time in a row. His victory margin in this election is almost three times that of the 2017 election. During the 2022 Uttar Pradesh assembly elections in Jewar, Singh defeated a renowned Indian politician and a Member of Parliament for 20 years, Avtar Singh Bhadana by a distinct margin of 56,315 votes.

== Achievements ==
=== Lift Act ===
Singh played a pivotal role in advocating for The Uttar Pradesh Lifts and Escalators Act, 2024, following a tragic incident involving a lift accident at a housing society in Noida.

=== Jewar Airport ===
Singh played a pivotal role in negotiations with farmers during land acquisition for the Noida International Airport or Jewar Airport, a flagship project in his constituency.

== Positions held ==
Singh has been elected 2 times as Member of the Legislative Assembly (MLA).

From	To	Position	Party
2017	2022	MLA (1st term) from Jewar	BJP
2022	Present	MLA (2nd term) from Jewar	BJP

== See also ==
- Pankaj Singh
- YEIDA City
- Noida International Airport (Jewar)
