= Jewar Assembly constituency =

Constituency of the Uttar Pradesh legislative assembly in India

Jewar
- Constituency No. 63 for the Uttar Pradesh Legislative Assembly

Constituency details
- Country: India
- Region: North India
- State: Uttar Pradesh
- District: Gautam Budh Nagar
- Total electors: 287,711 (2012)
- Reservation: None

Member of Legislative Assembly
- 18th Uttar Pradesh Legislative Assembly
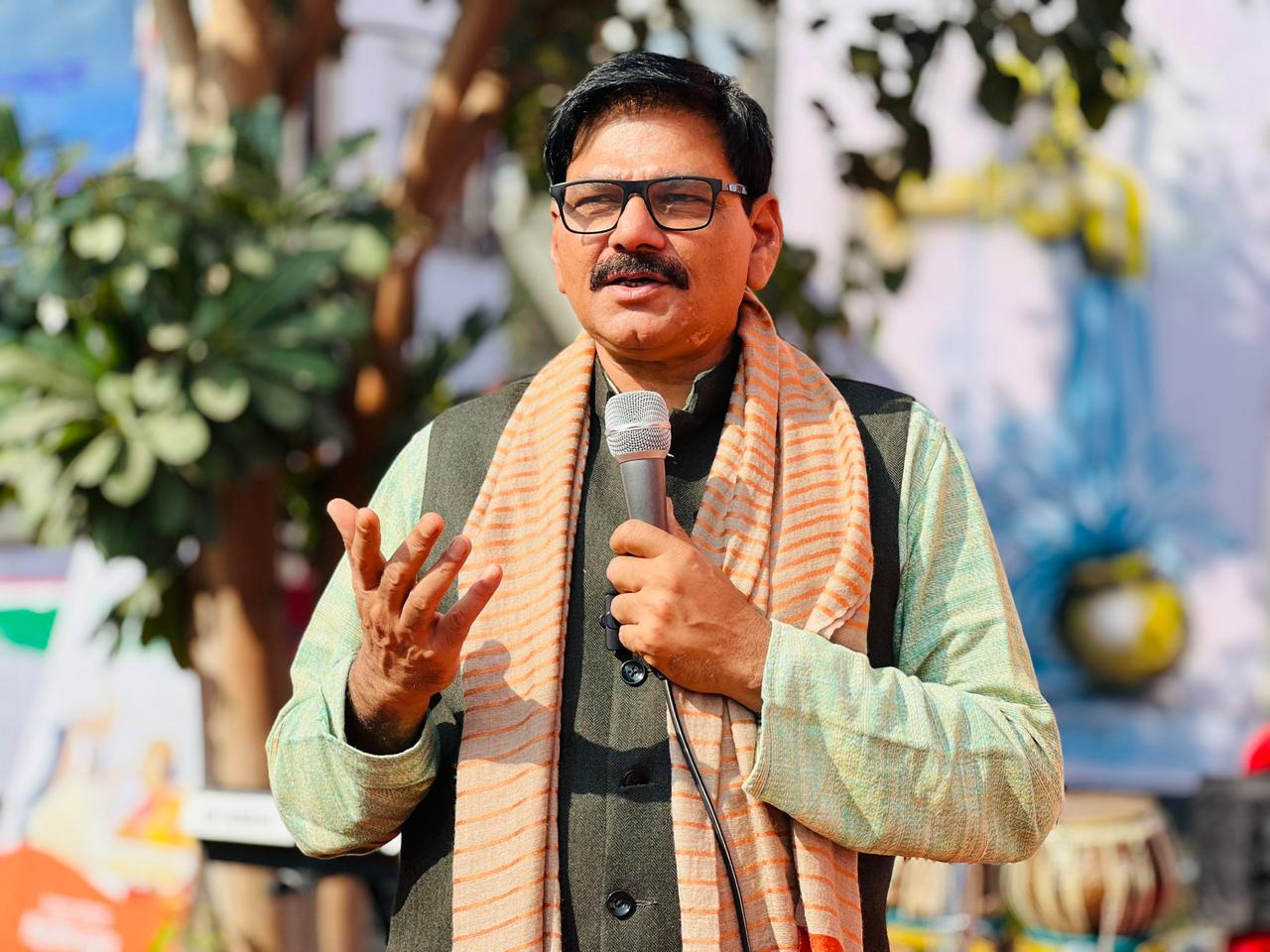
- Incumbent Dhirendra Singh
- Party: Bharatiya Janata Party
- Alliance: NDA
- Elected year: 2017

Jewar Assembly constituency is one of the 403 constituencies of the Uttar Pradesh Legislative Assembly, India. Jewar is a part of the Gautam Budh Nagar district and one of the five assembly constituencies in the Gautam Buddha Nagar Lok Sabha constituency. First election in this assembly constituency was held in 1957 after the "DPACO (1961)" (delimitation order) was passed in 1961. After the "Delimitation of Parliamentary and Assembly Constituencies Order, 2008" was passed in 2008, the constituency was assigned identification number 63.

From the 3rd to 15th Vidhan Sabha, this constituency was reserved for candidates from scheduled caste community.

== Wards / Areas ==
Extent of Jewar Assembly constituency is Jewar Tehsil; Ranhera KCs Dankaur, Bilaspur, Bilaspur NP & Dankaur NP of Gautam Budh Nagar Tehsil.

== Members of the Legislative Assembly ==
Year	Member	Party
1962	Jasram Singh	Indian National Congress
1967	Hari Singh Balmiki	Praja Socialist Party
1969	Dharam Singh	Bharatiya Kranti Dal
1974	Aidal Singh	Bharatiya Kranti Dal
1977	Aidal Singh	Janata Party
1980	Hari Singh	Indian National Congress (I)
1985	Ratan Swarup	Indian National Congress
1989	Aidal Singh	Janata Dal
1991	Horam Singh	Bharatiya Janata Party
1993	Laxmi Chand	Bharatiya Janata Party
1996	Horam Singh	Bharatiya Janata Party
2002	Narendra Kumar	Bahujan Samaj Party
2007	Horam Singh	Bahujan Samaj Party
2012	Vedram Bhati	Bahujan Samaj Party
2017	Dhirendra Singh	Bharatiya Janata Party
2022	Dhirendra Singh	Bharatiya Janata Party

== Election results ==
Vote share of winning candidates
2022	50.53%
2017	48.71%
2012	37.82%
2007	38.77%
2002	26.11%
1996	46.38%
1993	40.67%
1991	45.98%
1989	70.62%

=== 2027 ===
2027 Uttar Pradesh Legislative Assembly election: Jewar
Party	Candidate	Votes	%	±%
INDIA				
NDA				
BSP	Satveer Nagar Gujar			
NOTA	None of the above			
Majority				
Turnout				
gain from		Swing		

=== 2022 ===
2022 Uttar Pradesh Legislative Assembly election: Jewar
Party	Candidate	Votes	%	±%
BJP	Dhirendra Singh	117,205	50.53	+1.82
RLD	Avtar Singh Bhadana	60,890	26.25	+21.99
BSP	Narendra Bhati	45,256	19.51	−18.71
INC	Manoj Chechi	3,200	1.38	
NOTA	None of the above	1,694	0.73	+0.12
Majority		56,315	24.28	+13.79
Turnout		231,959	65.87	+0.42
BJP hold		Swing		

=== 2017 ===
2017 Uttar Pradesh Legislative Assembly election: Jewar
Party	Candidate	Votes	%	±%
BJP	Dhirendra Singh	102,979	48.71	
BSP	Vedram Bhati	80,806	38.22	
SP	Narender Nagar	13,239	6.26	
RLD	Kamal Sharma	9,016	4.26	
NOTA	None of the above	1,276	0.61	
Majority		22,173	10.49	
Turnout		211,414	65.45	
BJP gain from BSP		Swing		

=== 2012 ===
2012 Uttar Pradesh Legislative Assembly election: Jewar
Party	Candidate	Votes	%	±%
BSP	Vedram Bhati	67,524	37.82	−0.95
INC	Dhirendra Singh	58,024	32.50	−1.54
SP	Bijendra Singh Bhati	35,166	19.70	+15.59
BJP	Sunder Singh Rana	6,334	3.55	−7.20
Majority		9,500	5.32	+0.59
Turnout		1,78,536	62.05	+6.34
BSP hold		Swing		

=== 2007 ===
2007 Uttar Pradesh Legislative Assembly election: Jewar
Party	Candidate	Votes	%	±%
BSP	Horam Singh	46,125	38.77	+12.66
INC	Bansi Singh	40,491	34.04	+8.20
BJP	Geeta Kumari	12,786	10.75	−14.73
RLD	Rajpal Singh	9,782	8.22	
SP	Mukesh Valmik	4,887	4.11	−5.62
Majority		5,634	4.73	+4.46
Turnout		118,973	55.71	+3.51
BSP hold		Swing		

=== 2002 ===
2002 Uttar Pradesh Legislative Assembly election: Jewar
Party	Candidate	Votes	%	±%
BSP	Narendra Kumar	29,106	26.11	−6.43
INC	Banshi Singh	28,805	25.84	
BJP	Horam Singh	28,404	25.48	−20.90
Independent	Rajpal Singh	11,043	9.91	−10.21
SP	Mukesh Valmik	10,851	9.73	
Majority		301	0.27	−13.57
Turnout		111,484	52.20	+2.14
BSP gain from BJP		Swing		

=== 1996 ===
1996 Uttar Pradesh Legislative Assembly election: Jewar
Party	Candidate	Votes	%	±%
BJP	Horam Singh	48,871	46.38	+5.71
BSP	Dharamveer Singh Ashok	34,292	32.54	+26.65
Bharatiya Kisan Kamgar Party	Raj Pal Singh	21,199	20.12	
Independent	Danveer	473	0.45	
Majority		14,579	13.84	−0.75
Turnout		105,371	50.06	+2.94
BJP hold		Swing		

=== 1993 ===
1993 Uttar Pradesh Legislative Assembly election: Jewar
Party	Candidate	Votes	%	±%
BJP	Luxmi Chand	37,101	40.67	−5.31
JD	Rajpal Singh	23,794	26.08	
INC	Bansi Singh	19,710	21.61	−1.95
BSP	Prabhati Singh	5,377	5.89	+3.41
Independent	Rampal Singh	1,279	1.40	
Majority		13,307	14.59	−7.83
Turnout		91,225	47.12	+15.00
BJP hold		Swing		

=== 1991 ===
1991 Uttar Pradesh Legislative Assembly election: Jewar
Party	Candidate	Votes	%	±%
BJP	Horam Singh	26,255	45.98	+45.57
INC	Trilok Chand	13,450	23.56	+1.60
Independent	Ram Prasad	7,098	12.43	+11.54
Independent	Edal Singh	6,236	10.92	
BSP	Rajendra Kumar	1,416	2.48	−0.30
Majority		12,805	22.42	−26.24
Turnout		57,095	32.12	−14.32
BJP gain from JD		Swing		

=== 1989 ===
1989 Uttar Pradesh Legislative Assembly election: Jewar
Party	Candidate	Votes	%	±%
JD	Aidal Singh	57,431	70.62	
INC	Ratan Swaroop Rahi	17,859	21.96	
BSP	Dharam Pal Singh	2,263	2.78	
Independent	Ram Prasad	723	0.89	
BJP	Vijai Pal	332	0.41	
Majority		39,572	48.66	
Turnout		81,327	46.44	
JD gain from INC		Swing		

== See also ==
- Gautam Buddha Nagar Lok Sabha constituency
- Gautam Budh Nagar district
- Sixteenth Legislative Assembly of Uttar Pradesh
- Uttar Pradesh Legislative Assembly
