= List of bridges in India =

This is a list of bridges in India.

== Historical and architectural interest bridges ==
Image		Name	Local name	Distinction	Length	Type	Carries Crosses	Opened	Location	State	Ref.
	1	Umshiang Double-Decker Root Bridge		Double living root bridge	24 m (79 ft)	Suspension; Handmade from aerial roots	Footbridge; Mawsaw		Nongriat; 25°15′04.9″N 91°40′17.7″E	Meghalaya	(Note: According to the statement of residents/users involved in the maintenance the bridge, it is estimated to be 200 years old.)
	2	Rangthylliang 1 Root Bridge		Longest known living root bridge Height : 30 m (98 ft)	52 m (171 ft)	Suspension; Handmade from aerial roots	Footbridge; Wah Pynursla		Rangthylliang–Mawkyrnot; 25°18′12.9″N 91°52′19.2″E	Meghalaya	
	3	Bukka's Aqueduct in ruins	तुंगभद्रा बुक्का जलसेतु हम्पी	Vijayanagara era bridge Group of Monuments at Hampi; World Heritage Site (1986)		Masonry; Corbelled vaults, 13 arches remaining	Aqueduct; Tungabhadra River	14th century	Hampi; 15°20′47.4″N 76°27′11.5″E	Karnataka	
	4	Wazirabad Bridge	वजीराबाद पुल	Monuments of National Importance	24 m (79 ft)	Masonry; 6 openings	Road bridge	14th century	New Delhi (Wazirabad); 28°42′43.7″N 77°13′41.4″E	Delhi	
	5	Zaina Kadal destroyed in 1893		Inhabited bridge	87 m (285 ft)	Beam bridge Wood	Jhelum River	1426	Srinagar; 34°05′34.3″N 74°48′25.4″E	Jammu and Kashmir	
	6	Shahi Bridge	शाही पुल	Mughal era bridge State Protected Monument	199 m (653 ft)	Masonry; 10+5 ogee arches	Road bridge National Highway 135A; Gomti River	1568	Jaunpur; 25°44′56.2″N 82°41′04.5″E	Uttar Pradesh	
	7	Nurabad Bridge	नूराबाद ब्रिज	Mughal era bridge	79 m (259 ft)	Masonry; 7 ogee arches	Former road bridge Sankh River		Noorabad; 26°24′25.9″N 78°03′50.8″E	Madhya Pradesh	
	8	Purana pul	पुराण पुल	Mughal era bridge	185 m (607 ft)	Masonry; 22 ogee arches, sandstone	Road bridge Musi River	1578	Hyderabad; 17°22′02.8″N 78°27′29.5″E	Telangana	
	9	Athpula	अठपुला	Mughal era bridge Monuments of National Importance		Masonry; 7 four-centered arch	Footbridge; Lodi Gardens	16th century	New Delhi; 28°35′47.2″N 77°13′22.3″E	Delhi	
	10	Bara Pulah Bridge	बारापूला स्टोन ब्रिज	Mughal era bridge Monuments of National Importance	214 m (702 ft)	Masonry; 11 pointed arch	Road bridge Nala River	17th century	New Delhi (Nizamuddin East); 28°35′03.0″N 77°15′12.2″E	Delhi	
	11	Namdang Stone Bridge	नामदांग स्टोन ब्रिज		60 m (200 ft)	Masonry	Road bridge National Highway 2 Namdang River	1703	Sivasagar; 26°57′01.3″N 94°32′42.5″E	Assam	
	12	Kabini Bridge	काबिनी ब्रिज		225 m (738 ft)	Masonry; 51 arches	Road bridge Former Mysore–Nanjangud railway Kabini River	1735	Nanjangud; 12°08′25.2″N 76°40′32.1″E	Karnataka	(Note: This bridge is qualified as the oldest railway bridge in the world because it was built in 1735, before the very first railway lines, but the tracks were only installed in 1899 and the trains circulated on the bridge from 1092 to 2007.)
	13	Atharanala	अथरनाला ब्रिज	Monuments of National Importance	85 m (279 ft)	Masonry; Corbelled vaults,19 arches, laterite	Road bridge Musa Stream	18th century	Puri; 19°49′11.3″N 85°49′54.2″E	Odisha	
	14	Iron Bridge, Lucknow Dismantled		First cast iron bridge in India, removed c. 1960	27 m (89 ft)	Cast iron 3 arches	Road bridge Gomti River	1844–1845	Lucknow	Uttar Pradesh	
	15	Victoria Bridge, Mandi	मंडी का विक्टोरिया ब्रिज		76 m (249 ft)	Suspension; Steel deck, masonry pylons	Former road bridge Samkhetar Road; Beas River	1877	Mandi; 31°42′46.0″N 76°56′00.0″E	Himachal Pradesh	
	16	Punalur Suspension Bridge	പുനലൂർ തൂക്കുപാലം	State Protected Monument	122 m (400 ft)	Suspension; Chain bridge, steel deck, masonry pylons	Footbridge (former road bridge); Kallada River	1877	Punalur; 9°01′05.3″N 76°55′39.5″E	Kerala	
	17	Malviya Bridge	मालवीय ब्रिज		1,048 m (3,438 ft)	Truss; Steel, 2 levels Railroad bridge	Grand Trunk Road; Railway bridge Ganges	1885	Varanasi; 25°19′20.7″N 83°02′04.7″E	Uttar Pradesh	
	18	Bridge No.541		Mountain railways of India; World Heritage Site (1999)	53 m (174 ft)	Masonry; 4 levels, 34 arches	Kalka–Shimla railway	1898	Shalawon; 30°59′28.6″N 77°06′57.7″E	Himachal Pradesh	
	19	Pathimoonnu Kannara Bridge	പതിമൂന്ന് കണ്ണറ പാലം		138 m (453 ft)	Masonry; 13 segmental arches	Kollam–Sengottai Chord Line	1901	Thenmala; 8°58′02.7″N 77°05′26.9″E	Kerala	
	20	Pamban Bridge	पाम्बन पुल	India's first sea bridge	2,065 m (6,775 ft)	Cantilever; Steel; Bascule bridge	Railway bridge Gulf of Mannar; Palk Strait	1914	Pamban Island–Mandapam; 9°16′58.8″N 79°12′19.0″E	Tamil Nadu	
	21	Lakshman Jhula	लक्ष्मण झूला		137 m (449 ft)	Suspension; Steel deck and pylons	Footbridge; Ganges	1929	Rishikesh; 30°07′35.1″N 78°19′48.1″E	Uttarakhand	
	22	Coronation Bridge	कोरोनेशन ब्रिज			Arch; Concrete deck arch	Road bridge National Highway 31; Teesta River	1941	Sevoke; 26°54′10.2″N 88°28′23.6″E	West Bengal	
	23	Ram Jhula	राम झूला		228 m (748 ft)	Suspension; Steel deck and pylons	Footbridge; Ganges	1986	Rishikesh; 30°07′24.0″N 78°18′52.1″E	Uttarakhand	
	24	Akkar Bridge	अक्कर पुल	First cable-stayed bridge in India	154 m (505 ft)	Cable-stayed bridge Concrete deck, 1 concrete pylon 2x77	Road bridge Melli–Nayabazar Road; Rangeet River	1988	Jorethang; 27°07′59.5″N 88°16′43.2″E	Sikkim	
	25	Noney Railway Bridge under construction	ননে রেল ব্রিজ	Highest railway bridge pier in India; Pier's height : 141 m (463 ft)	703 m (2,306 ft)	Truss; Steel; 71+5x106+71	Jiribam–Imphal line Ijei River		Noney; 24°51′55.4″N 93°37′35.8″E	Manipur	(Note: The Yuanjiang Railway Bridge in China, completed in 2022, has the highest railway bridge pier in the world with 154 ft (47 m) from foundation to cap.)
	26	Tiger Valley Bridge	टाइगर वैली ब्रिज	Highest road bridge in India with deck height of 180 meters	305 m (1,001 ft)	650 m (2,130 ft)	Cable-stayed; Concrete deck, concrete pylons Twin bridges 40+132+305+132+40	May 1, 2026	Khandala; 18°45′06.6″N 73°21′16.6″E	Maharashtra	(Note: The length given only takes into account the main bridge, central span(s) and shore span(s), approach viaducts are not counted.)

== Major road and railway bridges ==
The largest of all indian's railway bridges is the Chenab Bridge, located on the Jammu–Baramulla line that connects the Jammu region and the Kashmir Valley, which turned out to be the most expensive line of Indian's railway network. The Chenab Bridge was the highest arch bridge in the world when opening in 2022 with a deck 322 m (1,056 ft) above the Chenab River, it's still the highest railway bridge on earth nowadays.

Extradosed bridges have experienced remarkable growth in India since the 2010s with a large number of multi-span bridges built on rivers such as the Ganges, which has significant widths in certain places. Their advantages are as follows:

- They allow longer spans than conventional beam bridges and therefore a reduced number of foundations.
- The thickness of the deck is considerably reduced (the Arrah–Chhapra bridge deck is 3.4 m (11 ft) thick), thereby minimizing the amount of concrete.
- They can be made up of precast segments even for medium spans and then be erected much more quickly and easily than the typical in-situ concrete construction.
- A more elegant aesthetic appearance than conventional beam bridges.

The first major extradosed bridge built in India is the Second Vivekananda Bridge between Howrah and Kolkata. It has 8 pylons and a suspended length of 880 m (2,890 ft), which was among the longest in its category at the time. Additionally it had one of the largest numbers of spans at the time. Another main feature of the bridge is its 29 m (95 ft) width with 6 road lanes for a single plane axial suspension.

The Arrah–Chhapra Bridge held the record for the longest total extradosed span length in the world when it was inaugurated in 2017, with 16 pylons and 1,920 m (6,300 ft), surpassing the well-known Twinkle Ibigawa Bridge in Japan. This record will be largely beaten by the new Kacchi Dargah–Bidupur Bridge under construction with 66 pylons and an extradose length of 9,750 m (31,990 ft).

The Rajendra Setu was the first rail-cum-road bridge in independent India on the river Ganga, one of the major rivers in the country.

This table presents the structures with spans greater than 120 metres (390 ft) (non-exhaustive list).

	Name	Local name	Span	Length	Structural type	Carries Crosses	Opened	Location	State	Ref.
1	Sudarshan Setu	ओखा बेट द्वारका सिग्नेचर ब्रिज	500 m (1,600 ft)	2,320 m (7,610 ft)	Cable-stayed; Composite steel/concrete deck, concrete pylons 2x50+100+500 +100+2x50	Road bridge Gulf of Kutch	2024	Okha–Bet Dwarka; 22°27′07.3″N 69°05′04.4″E	Gujarat	
2	Chenab Bridge	चिनाब पुल	460 m (1,510 ft)	1,315 m (4,314 ft)	Arch; Steel deck arch	Jammu–Baramulla line Chenab River	2022	Reasi; 33°09′03.2″N 74°53′00.0″E	Jammu and Kashmir	
3	Howrah Bridge	রবীন্দ্র সেতু	457 m (1,499 ft)	656 m (2,152 ft)	Cantilever; Steel; 99+457+99	Road bridge Hooghly River	1943	Kolkata–Howrah; 22°35′06.3″N 88°20′49.0″E	West Bengal	
4	Vidyasagar Setu	বিদ্যাসাগর সেতু	457 m (1,499 ft)	823 m (2,700 ft)	Cable-stayed; Composite steel/concrete deck, concrete pylons 183+457+183	National Highway 12; Hooghly River	1992	Kolkata–Howrah; 22°33′24.5″N 88°19′41.4″E	West Bengal	
5	Dobra Chanti Bridge	डोबरा-चांठी पुल	440 m (1,440 ft)	725 m (2,379 ft)	Suspension; Steel truss deck, steel pylons	Road bridge Single lane Tehri Dam Lake; Bhagirathi River	2020	New Tehri; 30°26′48.6″N 78°26′21.6″E	Uttarakhand	
6	Pipaldali Bridge	पीपलडाली पुल	390 m (1,280 ft)	390 m (1,280 ft)	Suspension; Steel truss deck, steel pylons	Road bridge Single lane Tehri Dam Lake; Bhilangna River	2007	New Tehri; 30°22′21.1″N 78°33′20.0″E	Uttarakhand	
7	Syansu Bridge	स्यांसू पुल	375 m (1,230 ft)	375 m (1,230 ft)	Suspension; Steel truss deck, steel pylons	Road bridge Single lane Tehri Dam Lake; Bhagirathi River	2007	New Tehri; 30°29′09.0″N 78°24′13.6″E	Uttarakhand	
8	New Zuari Bridge	नवो झुआरी पूल	360 m (1,180 ft)	640 m (2,100 ft)	Cable-stayed; Composite steel/concrete deck, concrete pylons Twin bridges 140+360+140	Road bridge Zuari River	2022	Tiswadi–Cortalim; 15°24′41.5″N 73°54′22.3″E	Goa	
9	Kota Chambal Bridge	कोटा चंबल नदी सेतु	350.5 m (1,150 ft)	1,115 m (3,658 ft)	Cable-stayed; Concrete box girder deck, concrete pylons 61+350+61	National Highway 27; Chambal River	2017	Kota; 25°08′28.0″N 75°47′37.8″E	Rajasthan	
10	Atal Setu (Basohli)	अटल सेतु	350 m (1,150 ft)	592 m (1,942 ft)	Cable-stayed; Composite steel/concrete deck, concrete pylons	Road bridge Ravi River	2015	Basohli–Dunera; 32°29′40.3″N 75°49′24.9″E	Jammu and Kashmir; Punjab	
11	Tiger Valley Bridge		305 m (1,001 ft)	650 m (2,130 ft)	Cable-stayed; Concrete deck, concrete pylons Twin bridges 40+132+305+132+40	Mumbai–Pune Expressway	May 1, 2026	Khandala; 18°45′06.6″N 73°21′16.6″E	Maharashtra	
12	Versova–Bandra Sea Link under construction		300 m (980 ft)	9,600 m (31,500 ft)	Cable-stayed; 75+150+75	Western Freeway (Mumbai); Arabian Sea	2027	Mumbai–Versova; 19°06′30.4″N 72°48′43.3″E	Maharashtra	
13	Anji Khad Bridge	अंजी खड्ड पुल	290 m (950 ft)	725 m (2,379 ft)	Cable-stayed; Steel truss deck, 1 concrete pylon 290+80+75	Jammu–Baramulla line Anji River	2023	Reasi–Katra; 33°04′48.2″N 74°54′52.0″E	Jammu and Kashmir	
14	Janki Setu		274 m (899 ft)	346 m (1,135 ft)	Suspension; Steel	Road bridge Ganga River	2020	Rishikesh; 30°07′24″N 78°18′52″E	Uttrakhand	
15	Aguani Ghat Bridge under construction	अगुआनी घाट पुल	270 m (890 ft)	3,160 m (10,370 ft)	Cable-stayed; Concrete box girder deck, concrete pylons 140+270+140	Road bridge Ganges		Sultanganj–Aguwani Ghat; 25°15′32.6″N 86°44′35.3″E	Bihar	
16	Raja Bhoj Setu		262 m (860 ft)	300 m (980 ft)	Extradosed; Concrete box girder deck, concrete pylons 262	Road bridge Raja Bhoj	2020	Bhopal; 23°15′35.6″N 77°24′45.4″E	Madhya Pradesh	
17	New Yamuna Bridge	नया यमुना सेतु	260 m (850 ft)	1,510 m (4,950 ft)	Cable-stayed; Concrete girder deck, concrete pylons 60+115+260+115+60	National Highway 30; Yamuna River	2005	Prayagraj; 25°25′39.7″N 81°51′40.4″E	Uttar Pradesh	
18	Signature Bridge	सिग्नेचर ब्रिज	251 m (823 ft)	675 m (2,215 ft)	Cable-stayed; Cantilever spar Composite steel/concrete deck, steel pylon 251+4x36	Road bridge Yamuna River	2018	Wazirabad–East Delhi; 28°42′20.9″N 77°13′56.3″E	Delhi	
19	Bandra–Worli Sea Link; Bandra channel	वांद्रे-वरळी सागरी महामार्ग	250 m (820 ft) (x2)	5,575 m (18,291 ft)	Cable-stayed; Composite steel/concrete deck, concrete pylons Twin bridges 250+250	Western Freeway (Mumbai); Mahim Bay	2009	Mumbai; 19°02′08.2″N 72°49′01.6″E	Maharashtra	
20	New Mahatma Gandhi Setu		242 m (794 ft) (x15)	5,634 m (18,484 ft)	Extradosed; Concrete box girder deck, 23 concrete pylons Twin bridges 7x(121+2x242+121) +121+242+121	National Highway 22; National Highway 31; Ganges	2024	Patna–Hajipur; 25°37′28.7″N 85°12′29.5″E	Bihar	
21	Durgam Cheruvu Bridge		234 m (768 ft)	764 m (2,507 ft)	Extradosed; Concrete box girder deck, concrete pylons 96+234+96	Road bridge Durgam Cheruvu	2020	Hyderabad; 17°25′54.5″N 78°23′24.3″E	Telangana	
22	Karimnagar Cable Bridge		220 m (720 ft)	500 m (1,600 ft)	Extradosed; Concrete box girder deck, concrete pylons 96+234+96	Road bridge Karimnagar Cable Bridge	2023	Karimnagar; 17°25′54.5″N 78°23′24.3″E	Telangana	
23	Kanaka Bridge under construction		217 m (712 ft)	255 m (837 ft)	Arch; Steel	Road bridge Teesta River	2027	Mangan; 27°32′17.7″N 88°29′04.1″E	Sikkim	
24	Phaphamau–Prayagraj Bridge under construction		200 m (660 ft) (x3)	3,840 m (12,600 ft)	Extradosed; Concrete box girder deck, 4 concrete pylons 130+3x200+130	National Highway 330; Ganges	2026	Allahabad–Phaphamau; 25°30′06.8″N 81°50′47.5″E	Uttar Pradesh	
25	Guwahati Cable Stay Bridge under construction		200 m (660 ft) (x5)	1,240 m (4,070 ft)	Cable-stayed; Concrete box girder deck, concrete pylons 120+5x200+120	Road bridge Brahmaputra River		Guwahati; 26°10′47.7″N 91°43′25.5″E	Assam	
26	Ramjhula		200 m (660 ft) (x5)	606 m (1,988 ft)	Cable-stayed; Concrete box girder deck, concrete pylons 100+2x200+100	Road bridge	2014	Nagpur; 21°09′12″N 79°05′16″E	Maharashtra	
27	Singshore Bridge		198 m (650 ft)	198 m (650 ft)	Suspension; Steel truss girder deck, steel pylons	Road bridge Single lane Singshore Khola	1993	Pelling; 27°15′39.3″N 88°06′43.6″E	Sikkim	
28	Bagchal Bridge		185 m (607 ft)	330 m (1,080 ft)	Box girder Prestressed concrete	Road bridge Sutlej River	2024	Swarghat; 31°15′23.0″N 76°40′59.3″E	Himachal Pradesh	
29	Mumbai Trans Harbour Link	सेवरी-नहावा शेवा पारपोत सेतु	180 m (590 ft)	18,187 m (59,669 ft)	Box girder Steel; Twin bridges 6x180m spans 3x150m spans	Mumbai Trans Harbour Link; Thane Creek	2024	Mumbai–Navi Mumbai; 18°59′26.0″N 72°56′43.9″E	Maharashtra	
30	KR Puram Hanging Bridge		180 m (590 ft)	230 m (750 ft)	cable stayed bridge Steel; Twin bridges 1x180m spans 3x150m spans	KR Puram Hanging Bridge; Krishnarajapuram	2003	Bengaluru; 12.995°N 77.68°E	Karnataka	
31	Hatania Doania Bridge	হাতানিয়া-দোয়ানিয়া সেতু	170 m (560 ft)	1,300 m (4,300 ft)	Extradosed; Concrete box girder deck, concrete pylons 85+170+85	National Highway 12; Hatania Doania river	2019	Namkhana; 21°45′38.2″N 88°14′04.4″E	West Bengal	
32	Jubilee Bridge no longer used since 2016	জুবিলি ব্রিজ	165 m (541 ft) (x2)	366 m (1,201 ft)	Cantilever; Steel; 165+37+165	Former Naihati-Bandel branch line Hooghly River	1886	Naihati–Bandel; 22°54′25.8″N 88°24′16.3″E	West Bengal	(Note: The given span arrangement is always the cantilevered arrangement, i.e. 420, 360 and 420 feet (130, 110 and 130 m) spans with a 120 feet (37 m) part between the two piers in the Hooghly River. The clear span arrangement is then $420 + 360/2 - 120/2 = 540feet$ (165 m).)
33	Chinyalisaur Bridge	न्यू ब्रिज चिन्याली	162 m (531 ft)	162 m (531 ft)	Arch; Steel through arch	Road bridge NH94; Bhagirathi River	2018	Chinyalisaur; 30°34′21.3″N 78°20′00.7″E	Uttarakhand	
34	Chenab River Bridge (Akhnoor)		160 m (520 ft)	280 m (920 ft)	Box girder Prestressed concrete 60+160+60	Road bridge Bye Pass Road; Chenab River	2008	Akhnoor; 32°54′09.5″N 74°45′47.6″E	Jammu and Kashmir	
35	Bridge No.20 Udhampur-Katra		153 m (502 ft) (x2)	306 m (1,004 ft)	Truss; Steel; 153+153	Jammu–Baramulla line Jhajjarkhad		Katra; 32°57′48.4″N 74°58′32.0″E	Jammu and Kashmir	
36	Bandra–Worli Sea Link; Worli channel	वांद्रे-वरळी सागरी महामार्ग	150 m (490 ft)	5,575 m (18,291 ft)	Cable-stayed; Composite steel/concrete deck, concrete pylons Twin bridges 2x50+150+2x50	Western Freeway (Mumbai); Mahim Bay	2009	Mumbai; 19°01′46.8″N 72°48′55.9″E	Maharashtra	
37	Sampreeti Bridge	সম্প্রীতি সেতু	150 m (490 ft)	417 m (1,368 ft)	Arch; Steel through arch 132+150+132	Naihati-Bandel branch line Hooghly River	2016	Naihati–Bandel; 22°54′25.2″N 88°24′16.8″E	West Bengal	
38	New Saraighat Bridge	নতুন শৰাইঘাট দলং	150 m (490 ft) (x2)	1,745 m (5,725 ft)	Box girder Prestressed concrete 105+150+8x123 +150+105	National Highway 27; Brahmaputra River	2017	Guwahati; 26°10′31.6″N 91°40′18.4″E	Assam	
39	Cable Bridge (Surat)	કેબલ સ્ટેઇડ બ્રિજ સુરત	150 m (490 ft)	918 m (3,012 ft)	Cable-stayed; Concrete box girder deck, concrete pylons 75+150+75	Road bridge Tapti River	2018	Surat; 21°10′54.1″N 72°47′46.2″E	Gujarat	
40	Atal Setu, Goa		150 m (490 ft) (x3)	3,190 m (10,470 ft)	Cable-stayed; Concrete box girder deck, 4 concrete pylons 75+150x3+75	National Highway 66; Mandovi River	2019	Panaji; 15°30′09.3″N 73°50′12.6″E	Goa	
41	Wahrew Bridge	वाह्र ब्रिज	150 m (490 ft)	169 m (554 ft)	Arch; Steel through arch	Road bridge Wahrew River	2021	Sohbar; 25°11′17.2″N 91°45′54.3″E	Meghalaya	
42	Kacchi Dargah–Bidupur Bridge	कच्ची दरगाह-बिदुपुर सेतु	150 m (490 ft) (x65)	9,760 m (32,020 ft)	Extradosed; Concrete box girder deck, 66 concrete pylons 65x150	Road bridge Ganges	2025	Patna–Bidupur; 25°36′55.6″N 85°20′08.4″E	Bihar	
43	Chamba Pattan Hanging Bridge		150 m (490 ft)	200 m (660 ft)	Box girder Prestressed concrete 25+150+25	Road bridge Balardu-Chamba Pattan Road; Beas River		Chamba Pattan; 31°49′46.3″N 76°15′45.9″E	Himachal Pradesh	
44	Akpa Bridge		150 m (490 ft)	300 m (980 ft)	Box girder Prestressed concrete	National Highway 5 Sutlej River		Akpa; 31°34′53.8″N 78°23′23.8″E	Himachal Pradesh	
45	3rd Narmada Bridge	तीसरा नर्मदा पुल	144 m (472 ft) (x8)	1,344 m (4,409 ft)	Extradosed; Concrete box girder deck, 9 concrete pylons 74+8x144+74	National Highway 48; Narmada River	2017	Bharuch; 21°42′51.8″N 73°02′41.5″E	Gujarat	
46	Janeshwar Mishra Bridge	जनेश्वर मिश्र सेतु	144 m (472 ft)	2,544 m (8,346 ft)	Extradosed; Concrete box girder deck, 16 concrete pylons 8x(87+144+87)	Road bridge Beyasi-Ballia Ganga Road; Ganges		Ballia; 25°43′11.3″N 84°12′19.7″E	Uttar Pradesh	
47	Ambhora Bridge	अंभोरा ब्रिज	140 m (460 ft)	705 m (2,313 ft)	Extradosed; Concrete box girder deck, 16 concrete pylons 8x(70+140+70)	Road bridge Wainganga River		Ambhora; 25°43′11.3″N 84°12′19.7″E	Maharashtra	
48	Jadukata Bridge		140 m (460 ft)	140 m (460 ft)	Box girder Prestressed concrete	State Highway 4 Nonghyllam Road; Jadukata River	2001	Ranikor; 25°14′07.6″N 91°13′20.2″E	Meghalaya	
49	BP Mandal Bridge	बीपी मंडल पुल	140 m (460 ft)	965 m (3,166 ft)	Cable-stayed; Concrete deck, concrete pylons 75+140+75	National Highway 231; Kosi River	2017	Pensalva–East Borne; 25°32′39.0″N 86°43′28.1″E	Bihar	
50	Nagpur Mumbai Package-15 FCC Bridge under construction		140 m (460 ft) (x4)	900 m (3,000 ft)	Box girder Prestressed concrete Twin bridges 2x140+2x85+2x140	Mumbai–Nagpur Expressway		Thane district 19°36′35.0″N 73°29′17.7″E	Maharashtra	
51	Majerhat Bridge		140 m (460 ft) (x4)	1,354.3 m (4,443 ft)	cable-stayed bridge Prestressed concrete Twin bridges 47.5m, 13.5m, 10.5m, 20m, 23m, 20m and 53.65m	Majerhat Railway Station Rd	2020	Kolkata; 22°31′05″N 88°19′23″E	West Bengal	
52	Chenab River Bridge (Gordah)		137 m (449 ft)	187 m (614 ft)	Box girder Prestressed concrete 25+194+25	Road bridge Chenab River		Gordah; 32°58′13.8″N 74°47′33.4″E	Jammu and Kashmir	
53	Sihorbala Bridge	सिहोरबाला पुल	135 m (443 ft)	170 m (560 ft)	Box girder Prestressed concrete	Road bridge Beas River	2015	Bhaleth; 31°48′47.8″N 76°28′27.8″E	Himachal Pradesh	
54	New Chandmari Bridge under construction		134 m (440 ft)	200 m (660 ft)	Cable-stayed; Composite steel/concrete deck, 1 concrete pylon 134+66	Road bridge Howrah railway station		Howrah; 22°35′12.7″N 88°20′08.3″E	West Bengal	
55	VishwaSundari Bridge	विश्वसुंदरी सेतु	131 m (430 ft) (x6)	1,296 m (4,252 ft)	Box girder Prestressed concrete 66+6x131+66	National Highway 19; Asian Highway 1 Ganges	1996	Varanasi–Ramnagar; 25°15′20.5″N 83°01′39.0″E	Uttar Pradesh	
56	Gyaman Bridge	ग्यमान ब्रिज	130 m (430 ft)	410 m (1,350 ft)	Box girder Prestressed concrete	Road bridge Balason River		Kurseong–Mirik; 26°53′12.2″N 88°14′07.4″E	West Bengal	
57	Bogibeel Bridge	बगीबिल सेतु	125 m (410 ft) (x39)	4,940 m (16,210 ft)	Truss; Steel, 2 levels Railroad bridge 33+39x125+33	National Highway 15; Railway bridge Brahmaputra River	2018	Dhemaji district–Dibrugarh district 27°24′28.2″N 94°45′39.0″E	Assam	(Note: Bogibeel Bridge is the longest rail-cum-road bridge in India, measuring 4.942 kilometres (3.071 mi) over the Brahmaputra river. This length only takes into account the main truss bridge with the common road and rail part, the overall length of the road part including north and south approach viaducts is 6.610 kilometres (4.107 mi).)
58	Naranarayan Setu	নৰনাৰায়ণ সেতু	125 m (410 ft) (x17)	2,285 m (7,497 ft)	Truss; Steel, 2 levels Railroad bridge 14x125+95+3x125	National Highway 17; Railway bridge Brahmaputra River	1998	Jogighopa; 26°12′36.7″N 90°33′35.9″E	Assam	
59	Bakhtiyarpur–Tajpur Bridge under construction		125 m (410 ft) (x43)	5,575 m (18,291 ft)	Box girder Prestressed concrete 71+43x125+71	Road bridge Ganges	2026	Bakhtiarpur–Tajpur; 25°29′19.2″N 85°37′46.5″E	Bihar	
60	Konkan Railway Bridge	जुआरी रेलवे पुल	124 m (407 ft) (x2)	1,317 m (4,321 ft)	Truss; Steel	Konkan Railway; Zuari River	1995	Tiswadi–Cortalim; 15°24′42.0″N 73°54′31.9″E	Goa	
61	Mandovi Railway Bridge		124 m (407 ft)	946 m (3,104 ft)	Truss; Steel	Konkan Railway; Mandovi River	1995	Carambolim; 15°31′20.0″N 73°55′22.0″E	Goa	
62	Munger Ganga Bridge	श्रीकृष्ण सेतु मुंगेर गंगा पुल	124 m (407 ft) (x29)	3,750 m (12,300 ft)	Truss; Steel, 2 levels Railroad bridge 32+29x121+32	National Highway 333B; Railway bridge Ganges	2016 (Rail); 2022 (Road)	Munger–Sabdalpur; 25°24′13.2″N 86°27′09.9″E	Bihar	
63	Barddhaman ROB Bridge	বর্ধমান স্টেশন নিউ ওভারব্রিজ	124 m (407 ft)	188 m (617 ft)	Cable-stayed; Composite steel/concrete deck, 1 steel pylon Twin bridges 124+64	Road bridge Barddhaman Junction railway station	2019	Bardhaman; 23°15′06.2″N 87°52′10.7″E	West Bengal	
64	Digha–Sonpur Bridge	दीघा-सोनपुर पुल	123 m (404 ft) (x36)	4,556 m (14,948 ft)	Truss; Steel, 2 levels Railroad bridge	Digha Pahleza JP Setu Road; Patna–Sonepur–Hajipur section Ganges	2016	Patna–Sonpur; 25°40′02.8″N 85°06′27.4″E	Bihar	
65	Saraighat Bridge	শৰাইঘাট দলং	123 m (404 ft) (x10)	1,298 m (4,259 ft)	Truss; Steel, 2 levels Railroad bridge	National Highway 27; Railway bridge Brahmaputra River	1962	Guwahati; 26°10′31.6″N 91°40′19.8″E	Assam	
66	Kali River Bridge	काली नदी पर सेतु	122 m (400 ft) (x4)	665 m (2,182 ft)	Box girder Prestressed concrete	National Highway 66; Kali River	1983	Karwar; 14°50′32.1″N 74°07′54.3″E	Karnataka	
67	Borim Bridge		122 m (400 ft)	411 m (1,348 ft)	Box girder Prestressed concrete	National Highway 566; Zuari River	1983	Ponda; 15°20′58.3″N 74°00′10.6″E	Goa	
68	Rajendra Setu	राजेन्द्र सेतु	121 m (397 ft) (x14)	1,822 m (5,978 ft)	Truss; Steel, 2 levels Railroad bridge	National Highway 31; Railway bridge Ganges	1959	Mokama–Barauni; 25°22′34.8″N 85°59′54.1″E	Bihar	
69	Sadarghat Bridge		121 m (397 ft)	472 m (1,549 ft)	Box girder Prestressed concrete Twin bridges	National Highway 37; Barak River	1967; 2019	Silchar; 24°49′50.3″N 92°48′18.2″E	Assam	
70	Mahatma Gandhi Setu	महात्मा गाँधी सेतु	121 m (397 ft) (x45)	5,750 m (18,860 ft)	Truss; Steel; Twin bridges 65+45x121+65	National Highway 22; National Highway 31; Ganges	1982; 2022	Patna–Hajipur; 25°37′28.2″N 85°12′30.8″E	Bihar	(Note: Due to structural failures, the bridge initially built as a balanced cantilever rigid frame had to be rebuilt. Box girders have been fully removed and a truss structure was installed in its place in 2022.)
71	Zuari Bridge	झुआरी पूल	121 m (397 ft)	809 m (2,654 ft)	Box girder Prestressed concrete	National Highway 66; Zuari River	1982	Tiswadi–Cortalim; 15°24′42.0″N 73°54′25.1″E	Goa	
72	Kolia Bhomora Setu	কলীয়াভোমোৰা সেতু	120 m (390 ft) (x24)	3,040 m (9,970 ft)	Box girder Prestressed concrete Twin bridges	National Highway 715; Brahmaputra River	1987; 2022	Tezpur; 26°36′11.8″N 92°51′24.2″E	Assam	
73	Calvim Bridge		120 m (390 ft)	494 m (1,621 ft)	Arch; Steel tied arch Bow-string bridge	Road bridge Mapusa River	2013	Calvim; 15°34′18.7″N 73°53′09.3″E	Goa	
74	Arrah–Chhapra Bridge		120 m (390 ft) (x15)	4,350 m (14,270 ft)	Extradosed; Concrete box girder deck, 16 concrete pylons 60+15x120+60	Road bridge Arrah-Chhapra Road; Ganges	2017	Arrah–Chhapra; 25°43′35.9″N 84°48′49.9″E	Bihar	
75	Chicham Bridge	चिचम ब्रिज	120 m (390 ft)	120 m (390 ft)	Suspension; Steel truss girder deck, steel pylons	Road bridge Single lane Samba Lamba Nallah	2017	Chicham; 32°20′35.5″N 77°59′49.4″E	Himachal Pradesh	
76	New Narmada Bridge under construction		120 m (390 ft) (x6)	2,220 m (7,280 ft)	Extradosed; Concrete box girder deck, 8 concrete pylons Twin bridges 2x(75+3x120+75)	Delhi–Mumbai Expressway; Narmada River	2026	Bharuch–Ankleshwar; 21°40′28.0″N 72°56′14.8″E	Gujarat	
77	Ramnagar Bridge		120 m (390 ft)	922 m (3,025 ft)	Truss; Steel	Road bridge Ganges	2017	Varanasi–Ramnagar; 25°16′16.8″N 83°01′11.0″E	Uttar Pradesh	
78	Aunta-Simaria Bridge	झुआरी पूल	115 m (377 ft)	8,000 m (26,000 ft)	Box girder Prestressed concrete	National Highway 31; Ganges	2025	Patna–Begusarai	Bihar	

== Planned bridges ==
	Name	Local name	Span	Length	Structural type	Carries Crosses	Opened	Location	State	Ref.
1	Beas River Expressway Bridge planned		ca. 700 m (2,300 ft)	1,300 m (4,300 ft)	Cable-stayed	Delhi–Amritsar–Katra Expressway; 8 lanes Beas River		Goindval; 31°20′25″N 75°8′18″E	Punjab	
2	Krishna River Bridge planned		480 m (1,570 ft)	864 m (2,835 ft)	Suspension with cable-stays Steel truss deck, concrete pylons 192+480+192	National Highway 167K; Krishna River		Malleswaram–Siddheswaram; 16°01′52.5″N 78°19′21.2″E	Telangana; Andhra Pradesh	
3	Kuchipudi Bridge on hold		180 m (590 ft) (x2)		Cable-stayed; Composite steel/concrete deck, 1 concrete pylon 60+2x180+60	Road bridge Krishna River		Amaravati–Vijayawada; 16°32′20.8″N 80°33′35.4″E	Andhra Pradesh	

== Alphabetical list ==
Name	State
3rd Narmada Bridge	Gujarat
Airoli Bridge	Maharashtra
Albert Victor Bridge	Tamil Nadu
Ancient Bridge of Hampi	Karnataka
Annai Indira Gandhi Bridge	Tamil Nadu
Arrah–Chhapra Bridge	Bihar
Atal Setu, Goa	Goa
Atal Setu, Jammu and Kashmir	Jammu and Kashmir
Atal Setu Bridge	Sikkim
Atharanala	Odisha
Bakhtiyarpur–Tajpur Bridge	Bihar
Balwali Railway Bridge	Uttar Pradesh
Bandra–Worli Sea Link	Maharashtra
Barapula Yamuna Bridge	Delhi
Bhadra Bridge, Bhadravathi	Karnataka
Bheja-Bakaur Bridge	Bihar
Bogibeel Bridge	Assam
Chatrapati Shivaji Maharaj Bridge Nashik	Maharashtra
Chenab Bridge	Jammu and Kashmir
Chetla Bridge	West Bengal
Coronation Bridge	West Bengal
Dayang Railway Arch Bridge	Assam
Dhola-Sadiya bridge	Assam
Dhubri-Phulbari bridge	Assam
Digha–Sonpur Bridge	Bihar
Dikhow Bridge	Assam
Dikrong River Bridge	Assam
Durgam Cheruvu Bridge	Telangana
Ellis Bridge	Gujarat
Fajjupur Eastern Peripheral Expressway Bridge	Delhi
First Teesta Bridge	West Bengal
Ganges Barrage	Uttar Pradesh
Geeta Colony bridge	Delhi
Godavari Arch Bridge	Andhra Pradesh
Godavari Bridge	Andhra Pradesh
Godavari Fourth Bridge	Andhra Pradesh
Golden Bridge	Gujarat
Goshree bridges	Kerala
Gouranga Bridge	West Bengal
Honnalli TB Bridge	Karnataka
Howrah Bridge	West Bengal
Indraprashta Metro Rail Bridge	Delhi
Indraprashta Rail Bridge	Delhi
ISBT Metro Rail Bridge	Delhi
Iswar Gupta Setu	West Bengal
ITO barrage	Delhi
Jangalkanya Setu	West Bengal
Jawahar Setu	Bihar
Jhusi Bridge	Uttar Pradesh
Jia Bharali river bridge	Assam
Jiabharali Rail Bridge	Assam
Jubilee Bridge	West Bengal
Kabini Bridge	Karnataka
Kacchi Dargah–Bidupur Bridge	Bihar
Kali River Bridge	Karnataka
Kampli bridge	Karnataka
Kanaka Bridge	Sikkim
Kanaka Durga Varadhi	Andhra Pradesh
Karimnagar Cable Bridge	Telangana
Kathipara Junction	Tamil Nadu
Kaveri Railway Bridge, Srirangapattanam	Karnataka
Koilwar Bridge	Bihar
Kolia Bhomora Setu	Assam
Korthi-Kolhar Bridge	Karnataka
Labertal budgam Bridge	Jammu and Kashmir
Mahanadi Bridge, Boudh	Odisha
Mahatma Gandhi Setu	Bihar
Malviya Bridge	Uttar Pradesh
Mandovi Bridge	Goa
Mumbai Trans Harbour Link	Maharashtra
Munger Ganga Bridge	Bihar
Namdung Stone Bridge	Assam
Napier Bridge	Tamil Nadu
Naranarayan Setu	Assam
Narengi-Kuruwa bridge	Assam
Naya pul, Hyderabad	Telangana
Nehru Bridge	Gujarat
Nehru Setu	Bihar
Netravati Bridge	Karnataka
New Haflong Bridge	Assam
New Nizamuddin Bridge	Delhi
New Saraighat bridge	Assam
New Yamuna Bridge	Uttar Pradesh
Nivedita Setu	West Bengal
Okhla barrage	Delhi
Okhla Metro Rail Bridge	Delhi
Old Godavari Bridge	Andhra Pradesh
Old Naini Bridge	Uttar Pradesh
Old Yamuna Bridge	Delhi
Pamban Bridge	Tamil Nadu
Parama Island Flyover	West Bengal
Penumudi–Puligadda Bridge	Andhra Pradesh
Phaphamau Bridge	Uttar Pradesh
Ponte Conde de Linhares	Goa
Prakasam Barrage	Andhra Pradesh
Punalur Suspension Bridge	Kerala
Purana pul	Telangana
Rajendra Setu	Bihar
Ramendra Sundar Tribedi Setu	West Bengal
Ramnagar Bridge	Uttar Pradesh
Ranighat Bridge Silchar	Assam
Sadarghat Bridge	Assam
Sampreeti Bridge	West Bengal
Saraighat Bridge	Assam
Second Mahanadi Rail Bridge	Odisha
Second Teesta Bridge	West Bengal
Sevoke Railway Bridge	West Bengal
Shahi Bridge	Uttar Pradesh
Sharavati Bridge	Karnataka
Signature Bridge	Delhi
Silver Jubilee Railway Bridge Bharuch	Gujarat
Singshore Bridge, Pelling	Sikkim
Subansiri Rail Bridge	Assam
Subansiri river bridge	Assam
Sudama Setu	Gujarat
Sulochana Mudhaliyar Bridge	Tamil Nadu
Third Mahanadi Rail Bridge	Odisha
Tunga Bridge	Karnataka
Tunga Bridge, Shivamogga	Karnataka
Tungabhadra Bridge, Harihara	Karnataka
Vashi Bridge	Maharashtra
Vembanad Rail Bridge	Kerala
Versova–Bandra Sea Link	Maharashtra
Vidyasagar Setu	West Bengal
Vikramshila Setu	Bihar
Vishwa Sundari Bypass Bridge	Uttar Pradesh
Vivekananda Setu	West Bengal
Wazirabad barrage	Delhi
Western Peripheral Expressway Bridge	Delhi
Yudhister Setu	Delhi
Zuari Bridge	Goa

== See also ==
- Transport in India
- Highways in India
- List of national highways in India
- Rail transport in India
- Geography of India
- List of rivers of India
- List of longest bridges above water in India
- List of longest bridges in West Bengal
- Bridges in Bihar
- List of bridges in Srinagar
- List of bridges on Brahmaputra River

== Notes and references ==
- Notes
- Nicolas Janberg. "International Database for Civil and Structural Engineering". Structurae.com.
- Others references
