= Geeta Colony Bridge =

- Coordinates: 28°39′05.33″N 77°15′47.58″E
- Carries: 6 lanes
- Locale: Delhi, India

Characteristics
- Design: T-section girder bridge
- Material: Prestressed concrete
- Total length: 560 m
- Width: 27.1m

History
- Construction start: December 2004
- Construction end: August 2008

Statistics
- Daily traffic: Motorway

Location
- Interactive map of Geeta Colony Bridge

Geeta Colony Bridge (also known as the Geeta Colony Flyover) is a bridge in the city of Delhi, India. It crosses the Yamuna river, connecting the Trans-Yamuna area in East Delhi with Ring Road near Shantivan.

== Role ==
The Geeta Colony Bridge provides access between east, north, northwest, and Central Delhi. It was built to reduce congestion on the 150-year-old Yamuna Bridge and ITO Bridge by providing alternate access between East Delhi and Old Delhi. It is centrally located and serves a heavily populated area, making it an important route for commuters.

== Design ==
Geeta Colony Bridge is a dual carriageway bridge that spans 560 meters divided into 14 40 meter segments. It has two roadways each 9 meters wide, and bicycle and pedestrian lanes on both sides and a central median verge. The total width of the bridge is 27.1 meters. An estimated 220,000 vehicles cross the bridge daily.

== History ==
On 29 December 2004, M/S Navayuga Engineering Co. Ltd. contracted to construct the bridge, at a cost of 99.765 crore INR. It was allotted a construction period of 36 months.

On 27 December 2019, in response to protests against the Citizenship Amendment Act, the bridge was barricaded, causing significant traffic delays.

== See also ==
- List of longest bridges above water in India
- List of bridges in India
- List of bridges
- New Yamuna Bridge, Allahabad
