= Old Yamuna Bridge =

Truss Bridge

Old Yamuna Bridge Delhi Lohe-ka-Pul
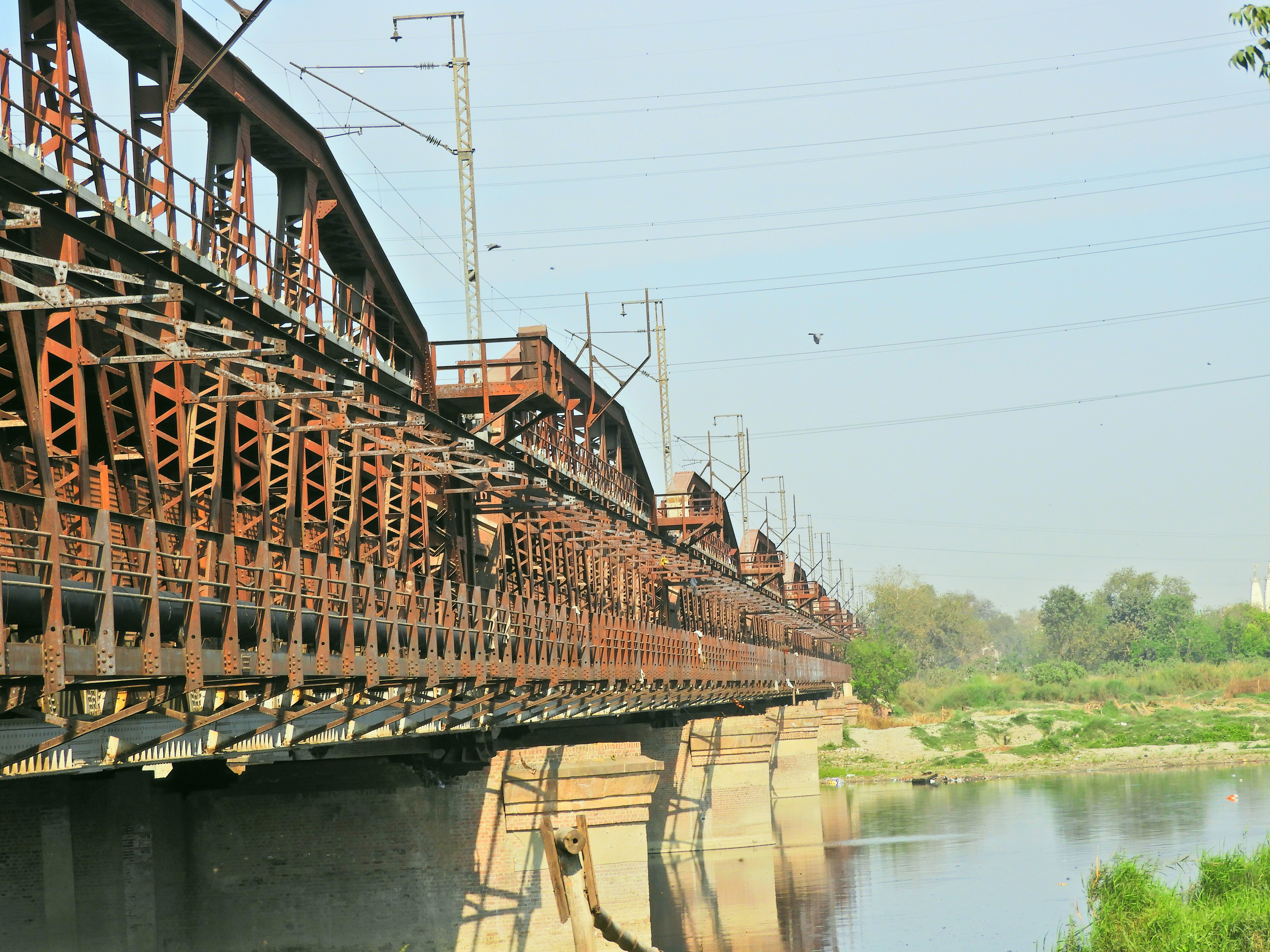
- Old Yamuna Bridge Delhi
- Coordinates: 28°39′49″N 77°14′55″E
- Carries: 4 lanes
- Locale: Delhi, India
- Official name: Bridge no 249

Characteristics
- Design: double-decked truss bridge
- Material: Steel
- Total length: 930.25 metres (3,052 ft)

History
- Construction start: 1863
- Construction end: 1866

Statistics
- Daily traffic: Railroad

Location
- Interactive map of Old Yamuna Bridge Delhi

The Old Yamuna Bridge, also known as Lohe-ka-Pul, or "bridge number 249", located in Delhi, is one of the longest and oldest bridges in India. Construction of the bridge began in 1863 and finished in 1866, with it opening for public use in 1867. The bridge is a double-decked steel truss bridge that runs east-west across the Yamuna river, connecting the district of Central Delhi to the district of Shahdara. It was constructed in 1866 by the East India Railway at a cost of £1,616,335, and has a total length of 2,640 feet (804.67 m) feet with 12 spans of 202.5 feet (61.72 m) each.

In the nineteenth century, two principal cities of North India, Kolkata and Delhi, were connected by railways, the bridge being the last link on this route. The bridge initially had a single line, and was later converted to a double line. There is a discrepancy about the year the second line was added; one source says that "In 1913, this was converted into a double line by adding down line girders of 12 spans of 202 feet each and 2 end spans of 42 feet to the bridge." But another source says "It was built for a single railway line but converted into a double line in 1932 and reopened in 1934" because of increased traffic on this section.

It has the capacity of serving roadways as well as railways simultaneously. The upper deck carries a two-lane railway line which connects Old Delhi railway station to Shahdra railway station, while the lower deck carries road traffic.

A new 992.25 metres (3,255 ft) long bridge is under construction adjacent to the Old Yamuna Bridge.

The bridge was commissioned in 1866, but before that, the original Delhi Junction came up in April 1864 in a temporary building before the first train service started. That structure could accommodate only 100 passengers at that time and had only two platforms. The first train from Howrah arrived in Delhi in 1864, but there was no direct line up to the station. So the passengers had to get down before the river and cross it by boat. Sometimes even coaches also crossed to the junction on boats, according to railway officials.

== See also ==
- List of longest bridges above water in India
- List of bridges in India
- List of bridges
- Old Naini Bridge
- List of road–rail bridges
