= New Nizamuddin Bridge =

New Nizamuddin Bridge Delhi
- Coordinates: 28°36′01.69″N 77°15′44.03″E
- Carries: 4 lanes
- Locale: Delhi, India
- Official name: Indo-Japanese Friendship Bridge

Characteristics
- Design: T-section girder bridge
- Material: Prestressed concrete
- Total length: 551.2m
- Width: 22.6m

History
- Construction start: 1996
- Construction end: 1998

Statistics
- Daily traffic: motorway

Location
- Interactive map of New Nizamuddin Bridge Delhi

New Nizamuddin bridge is one of the main bridge that connects Trans Yamuna in the east Delhi with Ring Road in South Delhi across river Yamuna. Also known as Indo-Japanese Friendship Bridge. There are eight motorway Bridges across Yamuna this is the sixth motorway bridge from north to south there are two more motorway Bridges south of this. The bridge was built in 1970 and later in 1998 widened to 8 lanes.

Vehicles from Ghaziabad and east Delhi use this route to connect with south Delhi, making it one of the busiest routes on NH-24. It was built by Larsen & Toubro with the help of Japanese Government's Grant Aid Scheme, through the Japan International Cooperation Agency (AJIC), and executed through the Indian Ministry of Surface Transport (MOST). Construction began in February 96 and was finished in two years time in February 1998. The bridge is 551.2 meters long and has 13 spans of 42-meter length. It has a total width of 22.6 meter, a four lane motorway that's 15 meter wide and 3-meter wide cycle tracks on both sides. It has a prestressed concrete superstructure.

== See also ==
- List of longest bridges above water in India
- List of bridges in India
- List of bridges
- New Yamuna Bridge, Allahabad
