= Arrah–Chhapra Bridge =

4.35 Km bridge over Ganga river in Bihar, India

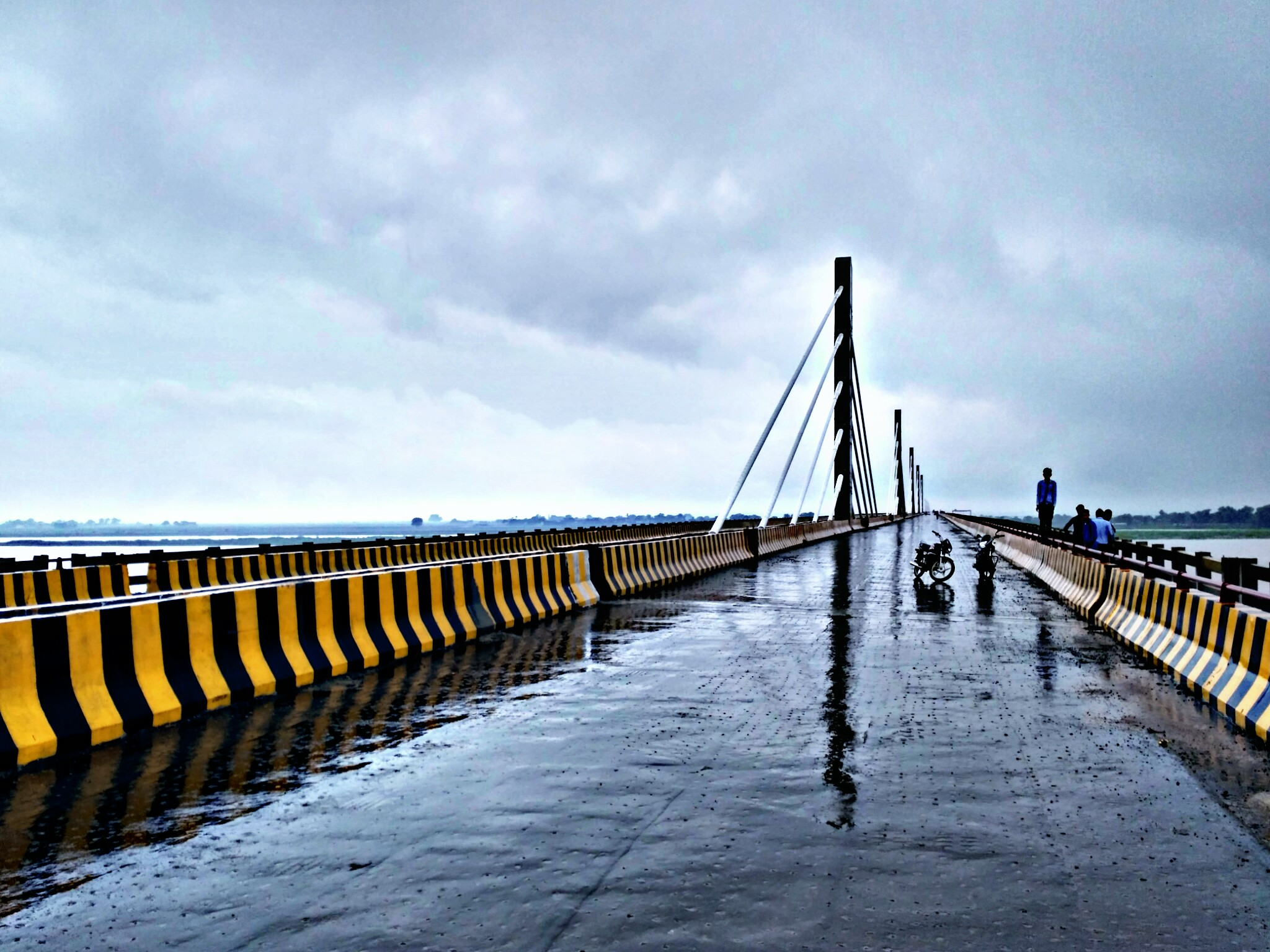
- Coordinates: 25°43′41″N 84°48′52″E
- Carries: 4-lane
- Crosses: Ganges
- Locale: Arrah and Chhapra in Bihar, India
- Other name: Veer Kunwar Singh Setu
- Maintained by: Bihar Rajya Pul Nirman Nigam Limited (BRPNNL)

Characteristics
- Design: Extradosed bridge
- Material: Concrete
- Total length: 4,350 m (14,270 ft)
- Width: 20.5 m (67 ft)
- Longest span: 120 m (390 ft)
- No. of spans: 16

History
- Designer: McElhanney Limited
- Constructed by: SP Singla Constructions Private Limited
- Construction start: July 2010
- Construction cost: Rs 800 crores
- Inaugurated: 11 June 2017

Location
- Interactive map of Arrah–Chhapra Bridge

Arrah–Chhapra Bridge (or Veer Kunwar Singh Setu) is the longest multi-span extradosed bridge in the world with a main bridge length of 1,920 m (6,300 ft). The bridge crosses over the Ganges River in India, connecting Arrah in Bhojpur district to Chhapra in Saran district of Bihar state. The bridge provides a roadway link between the northern and southern parts of Bihar. The bridge opened for public use on 11 June 2017.

As of April 2021, it is the 9th longest bridge above water in India. The second longest extradosed bridge is Kiso-gawa bridge in Japan which is 275 m long.

== Project ==
Politician Nitish Kumar laid the foundation stone for the Arrah-Chhapra bridge in July 2010. He said that his wish was to connect the Bhojpuri-speaking districts. The bridge reduced the distance between Chhapra and Arrah from 130 km to 40 km. This has greatly reduce the distance of Arrah, Aurangabad and Bhabhua districts from Siwan, Chhapra and Gopalganj districts. People can go from South to North Bihar without going to Patna district. This bridge connects NH-31 at Chirand near Chhapra to NH-922 at Koilwar near Arrah with a 4-lane bridge.

The ₹800 crore (US$95 million) bridge is the longest multi-span extradosed bridge in the world. The multi-span extradosed navigational section over the Ganges is 1,920m long and the bridge has a total length of 4.35 km, including the approach spans of more than 2 km. The 120m-long navigation spans are supported by five extradosed stay cables arranged in a single-plane harp configuration, whereas the approach spans are simply-supported. The navigation spans and 2 km of the approach spans are composed of single-cell precast concrete box girders, while the remaining 0.35 km of approach spans are cast-in-place. The total length of approach road on either side of the bridge is 17 km.

=== Accident ===
In September 2015, seven people were killed after a crane collapsed at the bridge construction site.

== Bridges across the Ganges in Bihar ==
The Ganges divides the state of Bihar in two parts. The river makes communication between the two parts difficult.

The first effort to bridge the gap was Rajendra Setu in 1959. The next bridge across the Ganges in Bihar was the 5,575-metre (18,291 ft) Mahatma Gandhi Setu, the longest bridge in India at the time of its commissioning in 1982. It was followed by Vikramshila Setu near Bhagalpur. The fourth bridge across the Ganges in the state is the Digha–Sonpur bridge.

Munger Ganga Bridge is also under construction. A 5.575-kilometre-long (3.464 mi) bridge Bakhtiyarpur-Tajpur Bridge is under construction which will connect Bakhtiyarpur and Tajpur.

Arrah–Chhapra Bridge across the Ganges connects Arrah and Chhapra. A road bridge parallel to the existing rail and road bridge, Rajendra Setu, has also been planned.

== Status updates ==
- Jun 2017: Bridge inaugurated by Chief Minister of Bihar Nitish Kumar on 11 June 2017.

== See also ==
- Koilwar bridge
- List of road–rail bridges
- List of longest bridges above water in India
