= Bakhtiyarpur–Tajpur Bridge =

Bridge in India

Magadh-Mithila Bridge
- Coordinates: 25.4892°N 85.6302°E
- Crosses: Ganga
- Locale: Patna - Samastipur

Characteristics
- Total length: 5,575 metres (18,291 ft)
- Width: 15 metres (49 ft)
- No. of lanes: 4

History
- Construction start: 2011
- Construction end: Dec 2026 (estimated)

Location
- Interactive map of Magadh-Mithila Bridge

The Magadh-Mithila Bridge (Hindi: Magadh-Mithila Setu), currently under construction, will span the river Ganges, connecting Bakhtiyarpur in Patna and tajpur in Samastipur in the Indian state of Bihar. Upon completion in Dec 2026, the bridge will provide an easy roadway link between the northern and southern parts of Bihar.

== The project ==
Current chief minister Shri Nitish Kumar laid the foundation stone for construction of the 5.575-kilometre-long (3.464 mi) bridge in June, 2011. Upon completion in Dec 2026, the bridge will reduce the load on Mahatma Gandhi Setu and also reduce the traffic in the capital city of Patna.

A road bridge parallel to the existing rail and road bridge, Rajendra Setu, has also been planned.

The bridge will also require construction of 45.393 km of approach roads on both ends of the bridge.

The total cost of the project is estimated at Rs 1602.74 crore, out of which Rs 100 crores will be spent on acquiring land. At first, Rs 917.74 crore is to be invested by Navayuga Engineering Company Limited (NECL) as a viability gap fund on a PPP basis. Rs 277.50 crore is to be invested by the Centre, and Rs 307.50 crore by the state government. The Bihar government would also bear the cost of acquiring land. NECL, a Hyderabad-based firm, was selected through competitive bidding.

Project is delayed and work is on halt for last few years.

== See also ==
- List of road–rail bridges
- List of longest bridges above water in India
- Loknayak Ganga Path
- Kacchi Dargah–Bidupur bridge
- Digha–Sonpur Bridge
