= Sadarghat (disambiguation) =

Sadarghat is the native name of the Port of Dhaka in Bangladesh.

Sadarghat may also refer to:

- Sadarghat, Chittagong, a thana in Chittagong, Bangladesh
- Sadarghat Bridge, a bridge in Assam, India
