= Atal Setu, Jammu and Kashmir =

Atal Setu
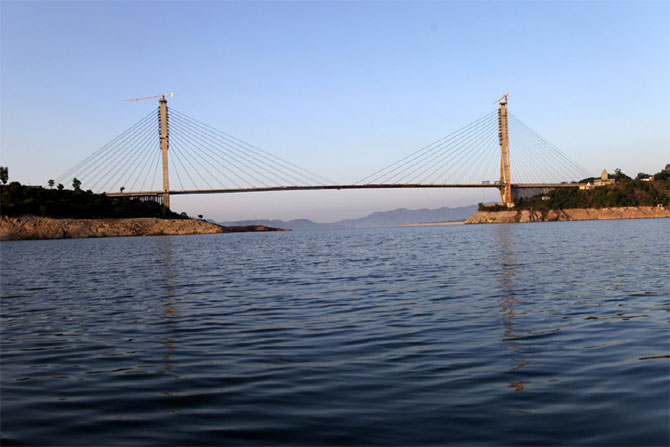
- Atal Setu
- Coordinates: 32°29′40″N 75°49′25″E
- Carries: Dunera To Basohli Road
- Crosses: Ravi River
- Locale: Basholi and Dunera
- Official name: Atal Setu
- Named for: Atal Bihari Vajpayee

Characteristics
- Design: McElhanney Consulting Services Ltd. (formerly Infinity Engineering Ltd.)
- Total length: 592 m

History
- Inaugurated: 24 December 2015

Location
- Interactive map of Atal Setu

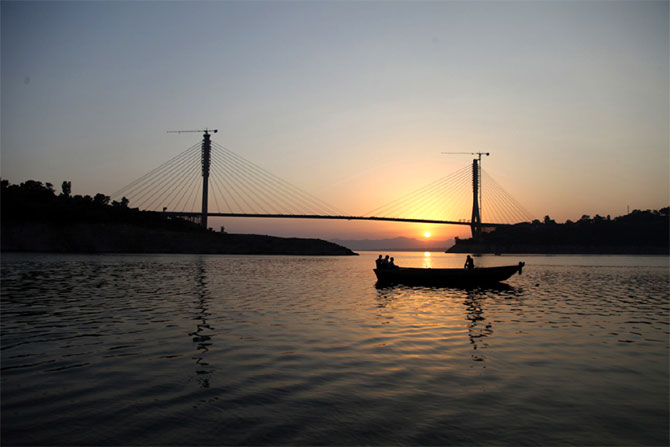
Atal Setu during construction

Atal Setu is a 592-metre (1,942 ft) cable-stayed bridge on the Ravi River near Basholi Town, District Kathua, commissioned on 24 December 2015 by former Defence Minister Manohar Parrikkar. The bridge spans between Basholi and Dunera and aims to improve road connections between Punjab, Jammu and Kashmir and Himachal Pradesh. This bridge is first of its kind in North India and fourth of its kind in nation. The other such three bridges are in Mumbai (Bandra-Worli sealink), Allahabad (Naini) and Kolkata (Hooghly).

IIT New Delhi approved the design of this bridge and the foundation stone was laid in May 2011 by UPA Chairperson Sonia Gandhi. The bridge was designed by a Canadian consultant, McElhanney Consulting Services Ltd. (formerly Infinity Engineering Ltd.). The Border Roads Organization, IRCON, Infinity and SP Singla Constructions Pvt Limited undertook its construction. The bridge is named after former Prime Minister Atal Bihari Vajpayee, and was opened one day before his birthday.
