= Kabini bridge =

Historic bridge in Karnataka, India

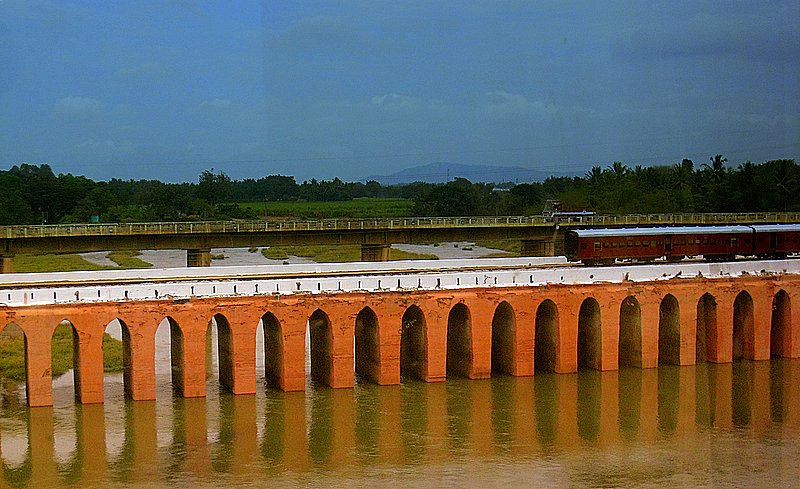
The Kabini Bridge

Kabini Bridge is a historic bridge in Karnataka, India constructed by local chieftain Dalvoy Devraj in 1730, spanning the Kabini River. It was laid over with a metre-gauge link connecting Mysore to Nanjangud in 1899. The bridge is 225 meters long with 56 piers and is built in Gothic style. The last metre gauge train to run over it was on January 17, 2007, after which the bridge was closed to traffic. The Mysore division of the South Western Railway has stated that they will renovate the bridge.

== History ==
The Kabini Bridge was commissioned in 1735 by Dalvoy Devraj, then commander under the Wadiyar rulers of Mysore. It was constructed using locally sourced brick, sand, and stone arranged in a medieval Gothic Revival architecture to carry bullock carts and carriages across the Kabini (Kapila) River near Nanjangud. More than a century and a half later, on 12 July 1899, the Mysore Nanjangud metre‑gauge railway line was extended over the existing structure, integrating rail traffic without major alterations to the original masonry. The bridge continued to serve mixed road‑and‑rail traffic until 2007, when India’s blanket conversion from metre gauge to broad gauge led to the withdrawal of all metre‑gauge services and the subsequent closure of the deck to trains. In October 2020, the Mysuru Division of South Western Railway proposed a ₹50 lakh conservation project- clearing vegetation, repairing damaged piers, and installing interpretive signage to preserve the bridge as a protected heritage landmark during the annual Dasara festival.

== Structure ==
The Kabini River Bridge spans approximately 225 metres on a gentle horizontal curve that follows the natural riverbank alignment, minimizing disruption to the flow and adjacent terrain. Its superstructure is carried on 56 robust stone piers, which in turn form 55 regular Gothic‑style arches, each with a clear span of about 10 feet (3 metres) and intervening piers roughly 8 feet (2.4 metres) wide, creating the bridge’s characteristic rhythmic silhouette against the water. Beneath the crowns of these arches lies a compacted earth cushion approximately 5 feet (1.5 metres) thick, engineered to evenly distribute both static and live loads across the masonry beneath.

The voussoirs themselves are dressed stone voussoirs, cut to tight tolerances and bonded with lime mortar around rubble infill, a technique that has enabled the structure to withstand centuries of monsoon-driven load cycles without significant settling or deformation. The bridge’s foundations rest directly upon the river’s bedrock, set in traditional lime concrete that conforms to the bedrock’s irregularities and offers long‑term resistance to scouring. Above water, locally quarried grey‑stone masonry was chosen for its compressive strength and its visual harmony with the Western Ghats' monsoon‑fed foliage. The vertical profile clears known seasonal high‑water marks, while the gentle banking and curvature channel floodwaters to reduce lateral pressures on piers, demonstrating an early but sophisticated grasp of landscape‑responsive civil engineering.

== See also ==
- List of bridges in India
- List of bridges in Karnataka
