= Old Naini Bridge =

Bridge in India

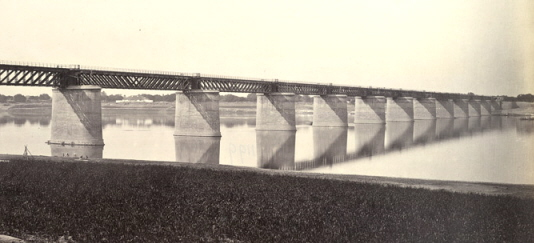
- Old Naini Bridge captured by Samuel Bourne, in the 1860s
- Coordinates: 25°25′26″N 81°51′01″E
- Carries: 4 lanes
- Locale: Prayagraj, India

Characteristics
- Design: double-decked truss bridge
- Material: Steel
- Total length: 1,006 metres (3,301 ft)

History
- Construction end: 1865
- Closed: 2019 (renovated 2021-2022)

Location
- Interactive map of Old Naini Bridge

The Old Naini Bridge is one of the longest and oldest bridges in India, located in Prayagraj. It is a double-decked steel truss bridge which runs across the Yamuna river in the southern part of the city. The bridge runs north–south across the Yamuna river connecting the city of Prayagraj to the neighbouring area of Naini. Its upper deck has a two lane railway line which connects Naini Junction railway station to Allahabad Junction railway station, while the lower deck has successfully been facilitating roadway services since 1927.

== See also ==
- List of tourist attractions in Prayagraj
- List of longest bridges above water in India
- List of bridges in India
- List of bridges
- New Yamuna Bridge
- List of road–rail bridges
