= Jawahar Setu =

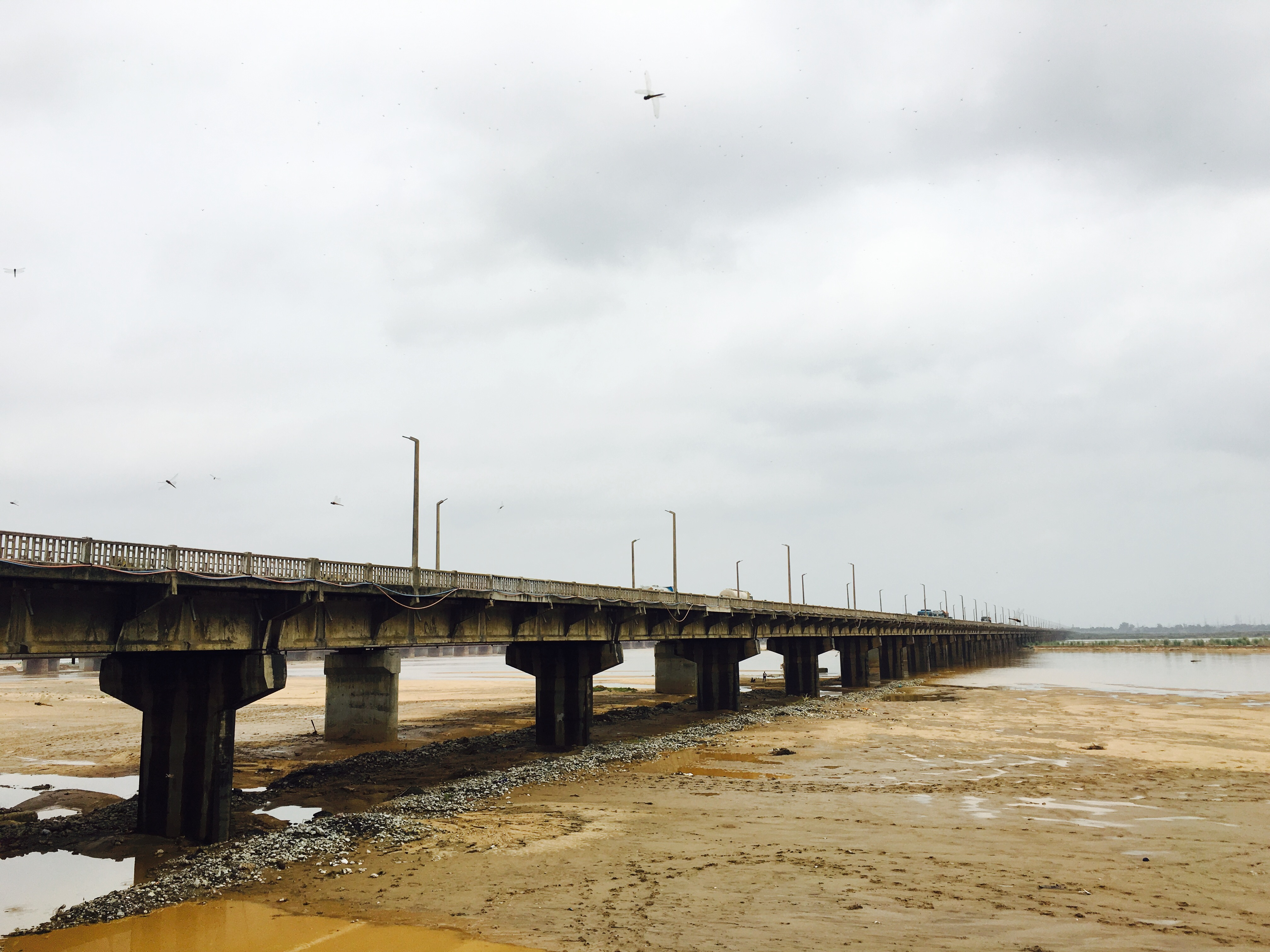
- Coordinates: 24°53′17″N 84°12′58″E
- Carries: NH 2
- Crosses: Son River
- Locale: Dehri-Son Nagar

Characteristics
- Total length: 3,061 metres (10,043 ft)

History
- Opened: 1965

Location
- Interactive map of Jawahar Setu

Jawahar Setu is across the Son River, between Dehri-on-Son and Son Nagar, in the Indian state of Bihar. It is named after the first prime minister of India, Jawaharlal Nehru. It was designed and completed in 1963 by principal engineer Shantaram S. Kashyap.

The 3,061 metres (10,043 ft) road bridge carries the Grand Trunk Road/ NH 2. It was built by Gammon India Ltd in 1963-65.

Nehru Setu, the rail bridge that runs parallel to the road bridge, was built in 1900.

== See also ==
- List of longest bridges in the world
- List of longest bridges above water in India
