= Bridge No. 541 =

The Bridge No. 541 which is situated at a distance of 50 m from the Kanoh railway station. Only a few families live in this small village named Kanoh and as there is still no road connectivity in the area, people are completely dependent on the Kanoh railway station for their livelihoods. It is still the highest arch bridge developed by the Indian railways in the year 1898. At that time mainly brick and stone were used to build the bridge. The bridge ranges 52.90 meters in length and 23 m in height and consists of 34 arches. It is the tallest bridge with four storeys of arch galleries in the Kalka-shimla route and has a reverse curve of 48 degrees. Places including the Bridge No. 541, Taradevi, Barog tunnel and Kandaghat station have also been visited by the UNESCO Team.
