= Kanaka Bridge =

Bridge in India

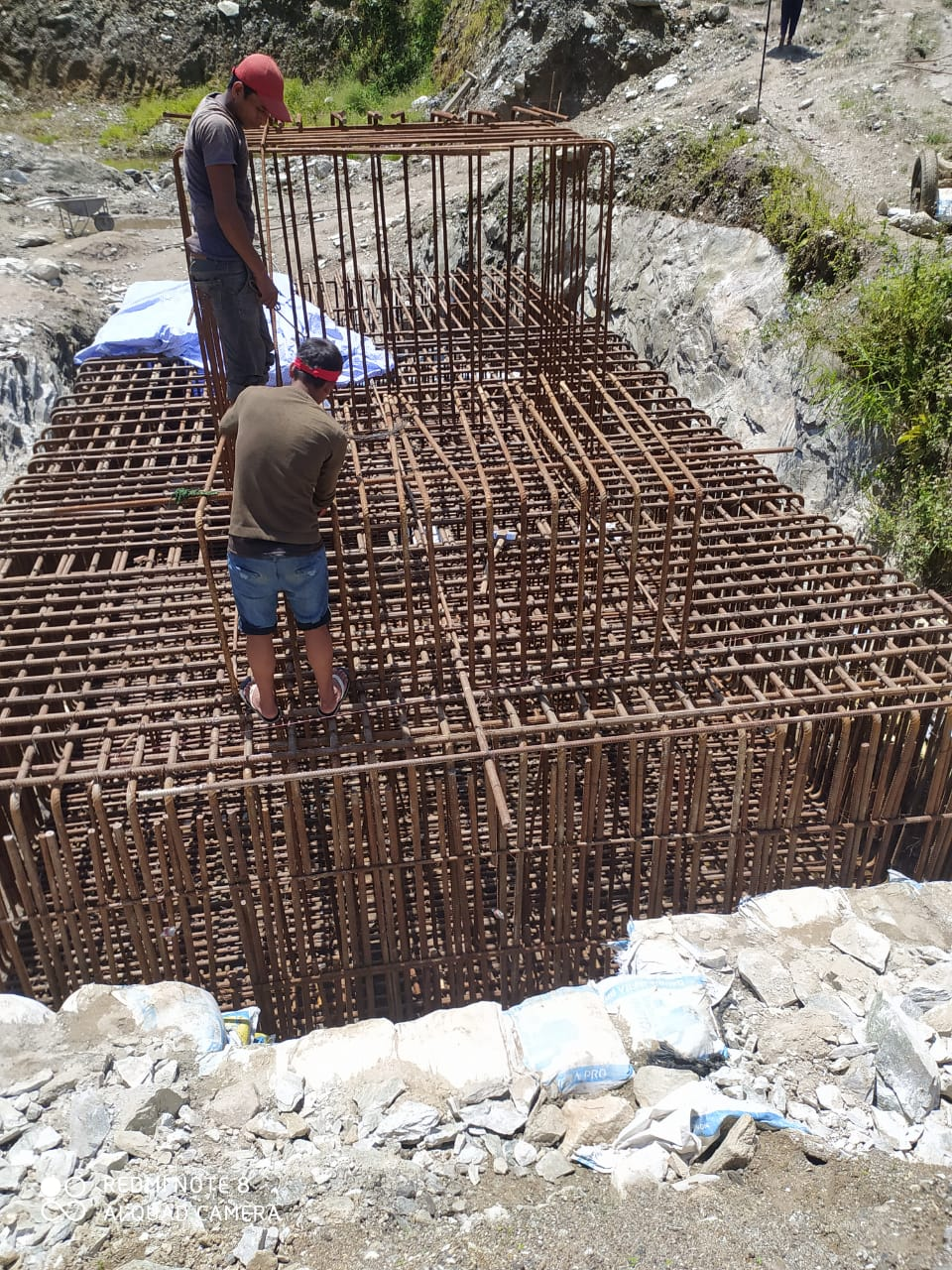
- Kanaka Bridge Under-construction, Sikkim
- Coordinates: 27.539123°N 88.484037°E
- Carries: 2 Lanes pedestrians and vehicles
- Crosses: Kanaka River
- Locale: Managan (North Sikkim) district of Sikkim

Characteristics
- Design: Arch Bridge
- Material: Steel and Concrete
- Total length: 255 m (837 ft)
- Height: 160 m (520 ft)
- Longest span: 217 m (712 ft)

History
- Construction end: 2027 (proposed)

Location
- Interactive map of Kanaka Bridge

The Kanaka Bridge, is an under construction 2 lane bridge over the Kanaka river (near Mantam lake) at Dzongu village in the Mangan subdivision of Sikkim state in India.

Kanaka Bridge is a two-lane steel bridge likely to be completed in 2027. The bridge is Under the Road and Bridge Department, Government of Sikkim.

== History of Construction ==
The Kanaka Bridge project was initiated in response to a massive landslide in August 2016 that blocked the Kanaka River at Mantam Lake. It has cut off road access to 13 villages in Upper Dzongu and forcing residents to rely on rafting boats and temporary Bailey bridges during low water levels. In July 2020, the Sikkim Roads & Bridges Department awarded an ₹88.5 crore contract to Mohindra Tubes Limited of Siliguri, and foundation works began by late 2020 under continued site inspections by Minister Samdup Lepcha. Despite monsoon challenges and initial land‑acquisition delays, authorities targeted March 2021 for completion, aiming to restore all‑season connectivity, enhance local tourism around Mantam Lake, and facilitate the movement of Indian Army units to the border region.

== Technical details ==
Kanaka Bridge is a two‑lane, through‑arch steel structure whose design was formally approved by IIT Mumbai and is managed by the Sikkim Roads & Bridges Department. The total span measures 255 m (837 ft) in length, with a single main arch reaching 217 m (712 ft) between the two riverbanks and 223 m (732 ft) along its centre‑line. The reinforced‑concrete deck slab is suspended via vertical hangers from the arch ribs, carrying vehicular traffic approximately 115 m (377 ft) above the riverbed (and 160 m/520 ft above the water surface), a clearance calculated to accommodate the Kanaka’s seasonal surge levels. The bridge’s load‑bearing elements consist of welded high‑strength structural steel arch ribs and bracing, supported on just two deep‑pile foundations of high‑strength concrete, each keyed into the local bedrock on either bank to ensure stability. The deck is rated for IRC Class 70R loading, enabling the safe passage of heavy military and civilian vehicles, and the structure incorporates continuous steel bracing and seismic dampers to meet Zone IV seismic criteria in this Himalayan region.
