= Mahatma Gandhi Setu =

Bridge connecting Patna and Hajipur in Bihar, India

- Coordinates: 25°37′19.0″N 85°12′25.7″E
- Carries: NH-22 and NH-31
- Crosses: Ganga
- Locale: Patna, Bihar, India
- Official name: Mahatma Gandhi Setu
- Other name(s): Ganga Setu
- Named for: Mahatma Gandhi
- Maintained by: National Highways Authority of India

Characteristics
- Design: Girder bridge
- Material: Concrete and steel
- Total length: 5.75 km (3.57 mi)
- Width: 25 m (82 ft)
- No. of spans: 45

History
- Designer: Gammon India
- Constructed by: Gammon India
- Construction start: 1972
- Construction end: 1982
- Opened: May 1982

Statistics
- Toll: No (revoked)

Mahatma Gandhi Setu (also called Gandhi Setu or Ganga Setu) is a bridge over the river Ganga in Bihar, India, connecting Patna in the south to Hajipur in the north. Its length of 5,750 metres (18,860 ft) makes it the fourth-longest river bridge in India. It was inaugurated in May 1982 in a ceremony in Hajipur by then-prime minister Indira Gandhi. From 1982 to 2017, Mahatma Gandhi Setu was the longest bridge in India. Later, the Gandhi Setu rehabilitation project was undertaken to install triangular steel trusses on Mahatma Gandhi Setu.

== Planning and significance ==
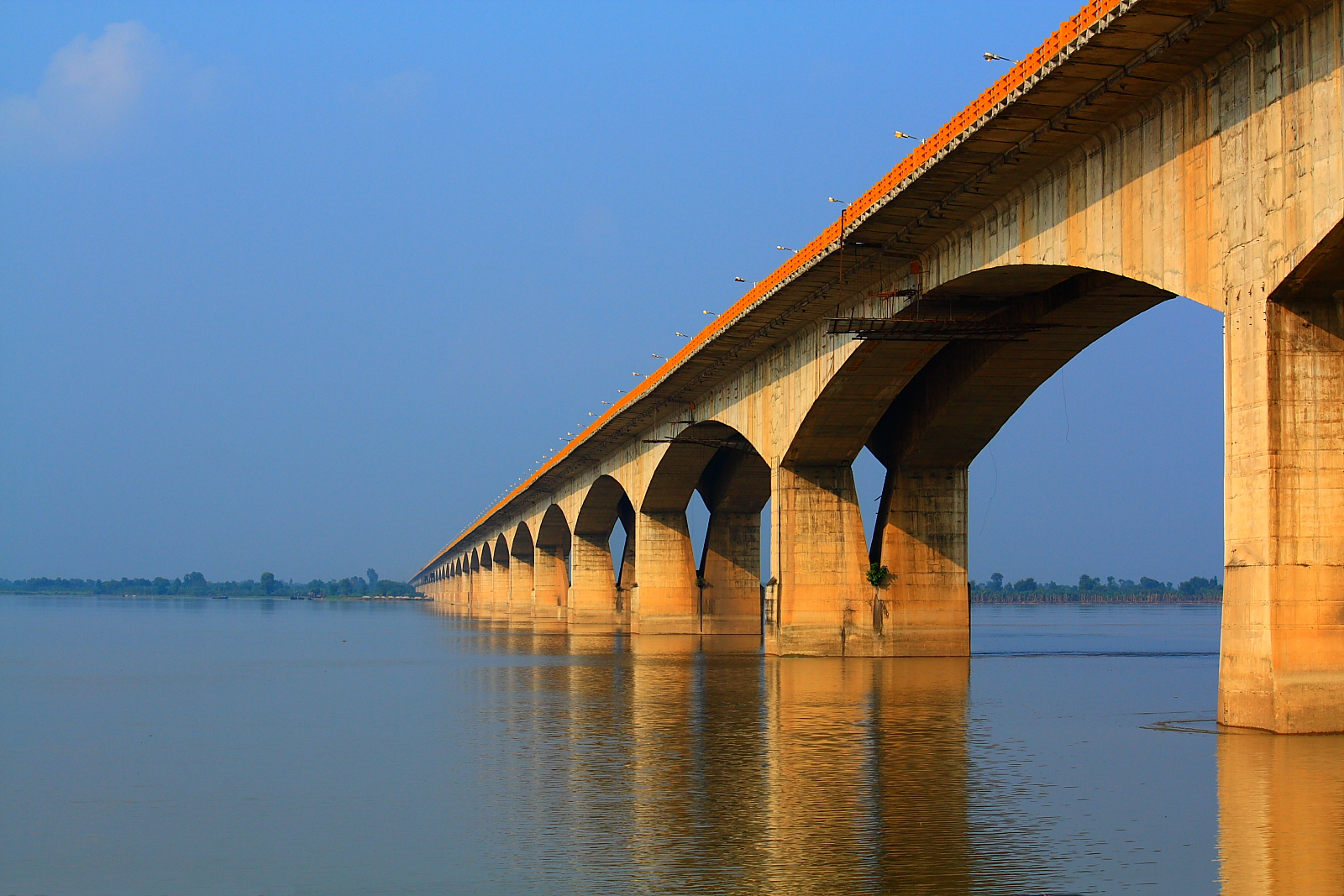
Old structure of Gandhi Setu Bridge in Patna, India

The bridge was approved by the Central Government in 1969 and built by Gammon India Limited over a period of ten years, from 1972 to 1982. The total expense was ₹87.22 crore (872.2 million rupees). It was built to connect North Bihar with the rest of Bihar through the state's capital at Patna, and as part of National Highway 19 (NH19). Before this bridge was constructed, the only bridge crossing the Ganges in Bihar was Rajendra Setu, approximately 85 kilometres (53 miles) to the east, which had opened in 1959. Since then, the Vikramshila Setu has also been built across the Ganges. Two more rail-and-road bridges were constructed between Digha and Sonepur and at Munger. More bridges named Kacchi Dargah Biddupur bridge under Greenfield expressway, at Chhapra, Bakhtiyaarpur, Sultanganj are under construction.

The Indian postal department issued a commemorative postage stamp, "Landmark Bridges Of India: Mahatma Gandhi Setu" on 17 August 2007.

== Engineering ==
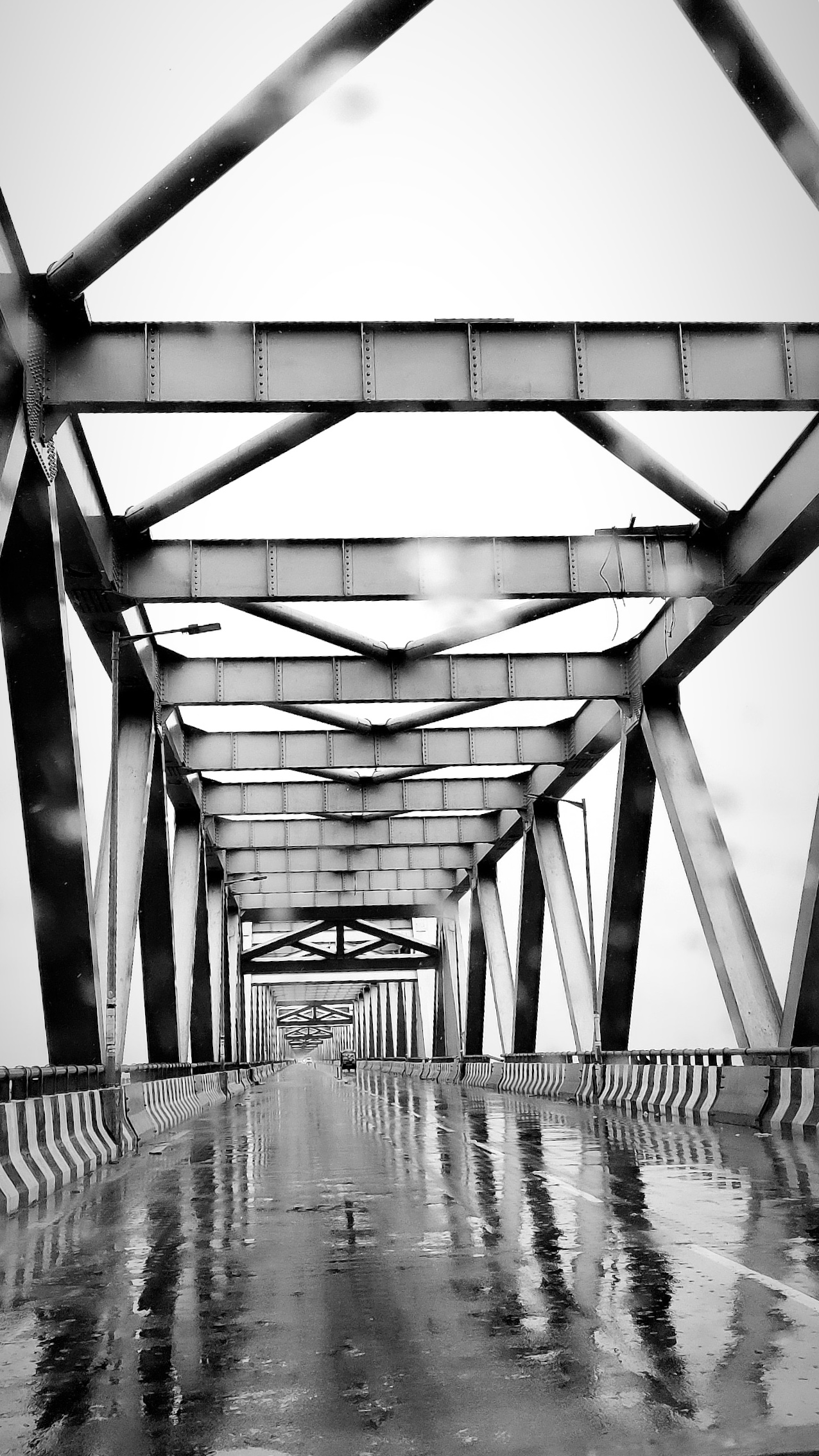
J.P. Setu a rail cum road bridge connecting Digha in Patna to Sonpur near Hajipur

The bridge consists of 45 intermediate spans of 121.065 metres (397.19 ft) each and a span of 65.530 metres (214.99 ft) at each end. The deck provides for a 7.5-metre-wide (25 ft) two-lane roadway for the Indian Roads Congress (IRC) class 70 R loading with footpaths on either side. The cantilever segmental construction method was adopted; each span has two cantilever beams on both sides which are free to move at the ends. It has two lanes, one upstream and the other downstream, each with a width of around 6 metres (20 ft). These lanes are free from each other with no connections. It was constructed using 3-metre (9.8 ft) pre-cast parts, which were joined at both ends to complete the span. The spans are connected with a protrusion which is free to move longitudinally. Vertical movement allows for vibrations from vehicular movement to transfer smoothly between spans without much discreteness.

== Traffic congestion ==
In recent decades, the bridge has experienced major traffic chaos due to the increasing number of vehicles crossing it, operating in excess of capacity and overloading the structure. In 2014, Bihar government announced plans to build two pontoon bridges parallel to Gandhi Setu, in order to relieve congestion problems. One pontoon bridge was opened in 2017. The bridge is crossed daily by over 85,000 vehicles and 12,000 pedestrians. On 21 September 2020, Prime Minister Mr. Narendra Modi laid the foundation stone of another 4-lane road bridge measuring 14.5 km and will cost ₹2926.42 crores It will be on the west side of the present bridge, and in the future, it will become 8 lane bridge including the present 4 lane bridge.

== History ==
- Construction started: Year 1972
- Scheduled opening: June 1978.
- Tender cost: ₹23.50 crore
- 1st Extension of Time (EOT): June 1980
- Allocated cost: ₹46.67 crore
- Reasons for cost increase: This extra cost is the outcome of an "in-built" cost escalation clause in the contract
- Reasons for delay: A heavy storm in April 1979 destroyed two gantries and casting beds. Each gantry crane weighs 300 tonnes. Huge shortage of cement and building materials and a workers' strike
- Reports: Cement and other building materials stored for this project find their way into Nepal and parts of Bihar

from the northern side of the bridge.

- 2nd Extension of Time (EOT): December 1981
- Project progress: 80% ( physical ) up to September 1980
- Billed value: ₹41 crore
- Contractor's extra claim : ₹50 crore

Litigation & arbitration: Disagreement between the contractors and the Government overpayments stalled construction activity. Claims and bills were referred to the Law Department. Final completion date: June 1982 ( Eastern carriageway ) Completion date: April 1987 ( Western carriageway ) Total cost: 87 crores Minister of State for Public Works: Raghunath Jha Chief Minister: Jagannath Mishra

== Structural integrity and failure ==
The bridge has often been subjected to structural loads and moving loads exceeding its design. Major repairs were initiated on it within five years of its completion. Poor maintenance, coupled with wear and tear caused by the unprecedented surge in traffic, has made the structure vulnerable. Other bridges in India which were built with the same cantilever design have developed cracks.

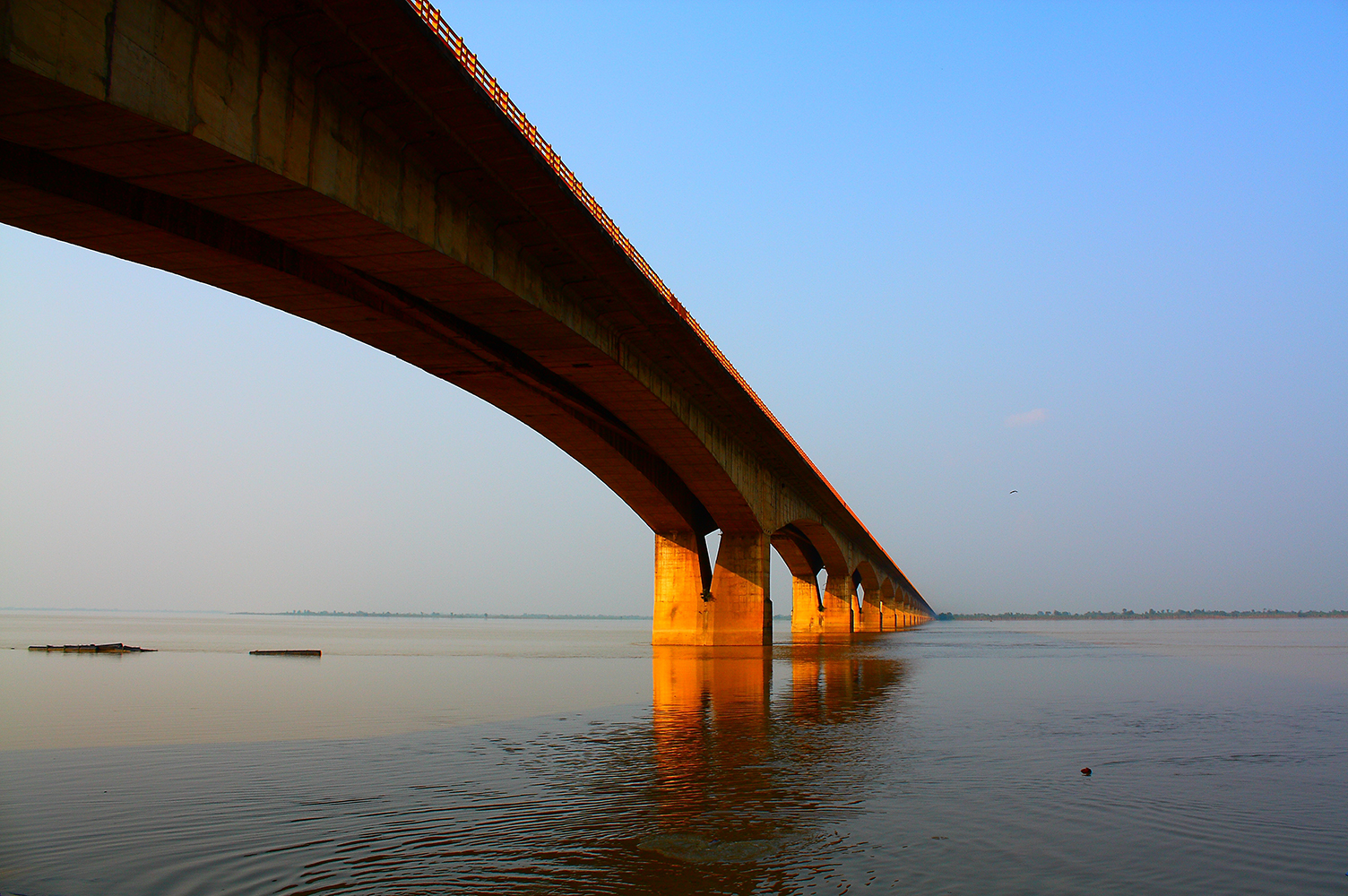
old concrete superstructure of Gandhi Setu before it was replaced

Investigations into the fissures developed in the bridge revealed the following defects: hammering at the hinges when vehicles plied; finger-type expansion joints in an advanced state of distress; wearing coat cracks; spilling of concrete at transverse joints; longitudinal cracks in precast segments; leakage of water inside the box girder from joints between segments and from holes provided for lifting the segments.

== Gandhi Setu rehabilitation project ==
In 2018, it was reported that Mahatma Gandhi Setu is being revamped. Gandhi Setu rehabilitation project has been completed by Afcons Infrastructure in joint venture with Sibmost OJSC at an estimated cost of ₹1,742.01 crore. Of that, Rs 237 crore is spent on dismantling the structure that was replaced by the steel framework. The superstructure of Gandhi Setu was renewed by Steel Truss Girders, i.e. the steel framework replaced the entire concrete superstructure. While the superstructure was damaged, the pillars were not and nor was the foundation weakened. The triangular steel trusses were installed on each flank of Gandhi Setu. The renovated Western flank was opened to the public on 31 July 2020, and the completed bridge (including both flanks) was inaugurated in June 2022.

== See also ==
- List of longest bridges in the world
- List of longest bridges above water in India
- List of bridges in India
- Kacchi Dargah-Bidupur Bridge
