= Bara Pulah Bridge =

Bridge in India

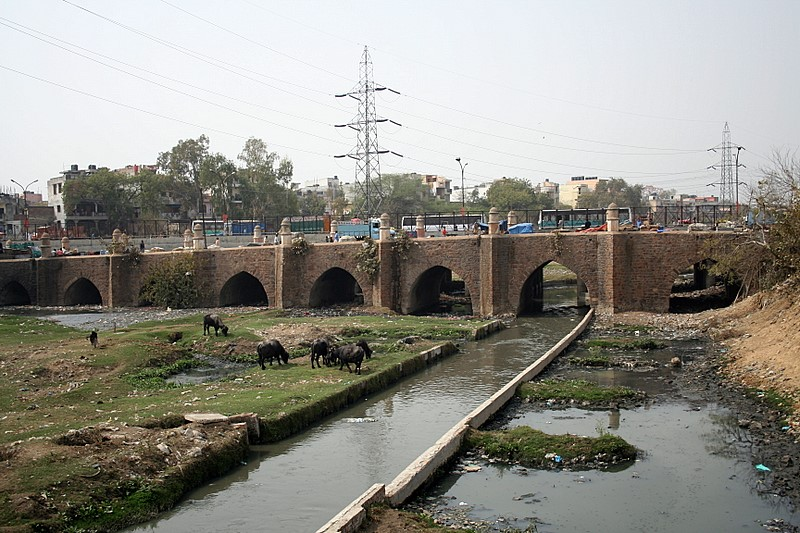
- Coordinates: 28°35′03″N 77°15′12″E
- Carries: Road traffic
- Locale: Delhi, India
- Other name: BaraPullah Bridge

Characteristics
- Design: Arch bridge
- Total length: 200 metres (660 ft)

Location
- Interactive map of Bara Pulah Bridge

The Bara Pulah Bridge or Barapullah Bridge is a busy road-passing in Delhi, India, near Humayun's Tomb and Khan-i-Khana's Tomb. It is surrounded by the fruit and vegetable market behind the Nizamuddin railway station. Due to the increasing population and traffic problems, the government announced a new Barapullah Elevated Road project during the Delhi Commonwealth Games. The new overpass bridge has marginally solved the traffic problems, but has overshadowed the historic bridge which is now almost invisible and overrun by squatters. The BaraPullah Bridge is a monument of national importance and protected by the Archaeological Survey of India (ASI).

== History ==
The Barapullah bridge was built by Mihr Banu Agha nearly 400 years ago. According to historians, the bridge was built under Jahangir's rule and personally commissioned by him. The Mughals used the bridge to cross the Yamuna river to reach Nizamuddin Dargah and Humayun's Tomb while returning from Agra. In 1628 the road between the bridge and Humayun's Tomb was a wide tree-lined path and was considered the most beautiful bridge of Delhi.

In August 2024, the ASI started restoration of the bridge. They removed silt and garbage collected on the neglected bridge and aim to restore it as a pedestrian bridge.

== Architecture ==
The bridge structure has 12 piers and 11 arches, and it is 200 metres (660 ft) in length.
