= Singshore Bridge, Pelling =

Suspension bridge in Pelling, Sikkim

Singshore Bridge
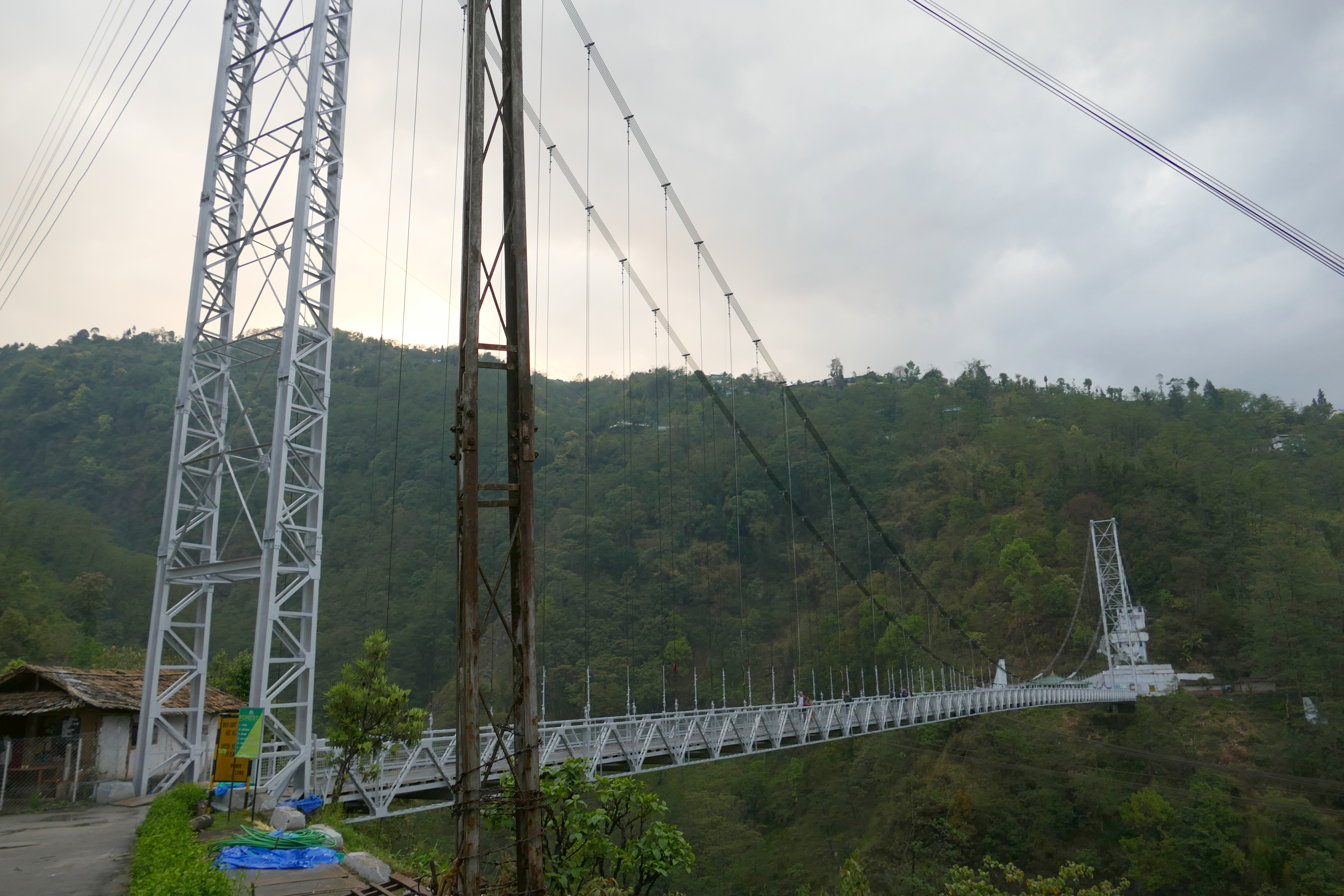
- Singshore Bridge, Pelling
- Coordinates: 27.26154°N 88.11167°E
- Locale: Pelling, West Sikkim district, Sikkim, India

Characteristics
- Design: Suspension bridge
- Total length: 240 m (787 ft)
- Height: 100 m (328 ft)

Singshore Bridge is a suspension bridge located in Pelling, Sikkim, India.

== Description ==
The bridge is 240 m (787 ft) long and over 100 m (328 ft) high, making it the highest bridge in Sikkim. It was constructed in the early 2000s and is built of iron and concrete. Set amidst verdant hills and valleys, the bridge connects two villages, Dentam and Uttarey. It offers a view of the surrounding hills, streams and waterfalls. The bridge was built with the purpose of shortening the distance between two gorges. It regularly attracts a significant number of tourists.

== Location ==
Singshore Bridge is situated at a distance of 5 km (3.1 mi) from Pelling in West Sikkim district, Sikkim. It is about 20 km (12.4 mi) away from the village of Uttarey. Not too far away from the bridge is located the Alpine Cheese Factory, which deals in Gouda cheese. The nearest railway station is New Jalpaiguri Junction railway station and the nearest airport is Bagdogra Airport in Bagdogra, Siliguri.
