= Kali River Bridge =

Bridge in Karwar, India

Coordinates: 14°50′32″N 74°07′55″E

Kali River Bridge was constructed over the Kali river in the city of Karwar in Uttara Kannada district, Karnataka. It was built in 1983. The bridge connects the state of Karnataka with Goa by road. The Sadashivgad Fort of Sadashivgad is located next to this bridge.
