= Ganges Barrage =

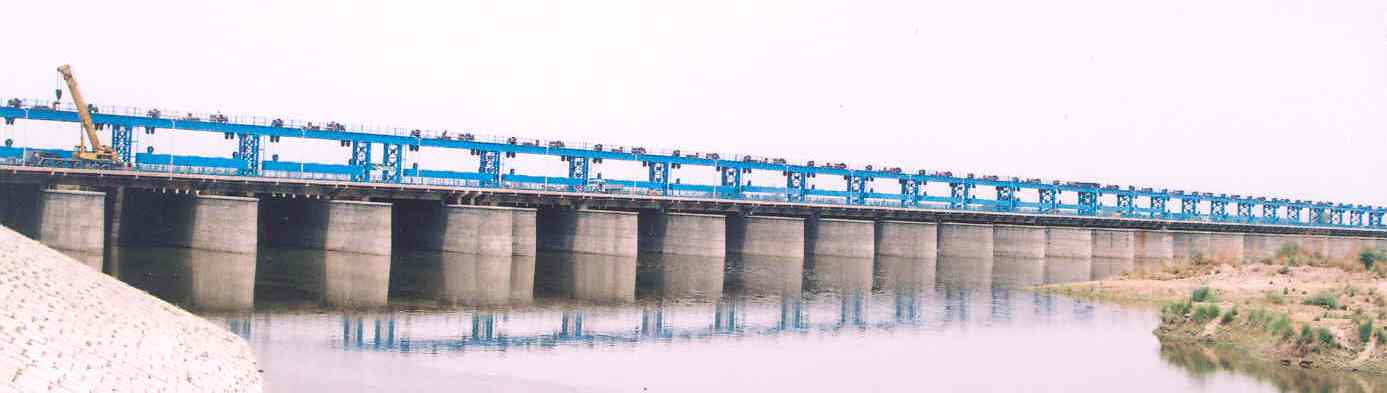
- Interactive map of Ganges Barrage
- Official name: Luv Kush Barrage
- Location: Kanpur, India
- Coordinates: 26.5099°N 80.3186°E
- Construction began: 1995
- Opening date: May 2000
- Construction cost: Rs. 303.14 crore

Dam and spillways
- Impounds: Ganges River
- Length: 621 m

The Ganges Barrage, officially named as the Lav Khush Barrage, is a bridge across the Ganges river at Azad Nagar-Nawabganj near Kanpur's Marine drive Atal Ghat in Kanpur.

Construction started in 1995 and it was inaugurated in May 2000. The total length is 621 metres (2,037 ft). The bridge serves as a four-lane highway bypass for NH 91. It serves as an entry point to the under-construction satellite township known as Trans Ganga City.

== Proposed developments ==
=== Botanical garden ===
The layout plan of John Forbes Botanical Garden, prepared by a Delhi-based architect, was approved by the Kanpur Development Authority in 2014. There would be other attractions for entertainment and resources to improve the knowledge of children. There would be a cinema house and an artificial lake. Water museum would be another attraction while trees would illuminate in the evening. For cultural programme a well equipped platform is also proposed. There would be a shopping-cum-kid museum block, food court, game, entertainment zone and provision of two banquet halls.

=== Trans Ganga city ===
The Trans Ganga City project, billed as a modern and clean-green city, would be developed by Uttar Pradesh State Industrial Development Corporation. Under the project, along with industrial and residential areas, commercial and institutional areas would be developed. A housing society comprising exhibition centre, multiplex, mega mall and multi-storied residential complexes are proposed. The industries in the enclave would be pollution free and it would be zero discharge area, so that it does not cause adverse impact on the ecology and Ganga river.

A high speed train was proposed between Ganga Barrage and Lucknow which will give relief for daily commuters between two cities.

=== Awadh Expressway ===
A new expressway between Kanpur and Lucknow will be connected to Ganga Barrage. It would be six expandable upto 8 lane access controlled expressway.

=== Amusement park ===
The Kanpur Development Authority has planned to develop an amusement park in the city near Ganga Barrage. On the lines of Delhi Daat, it is also planning to develop a 'haat' inside the park where only handicraft items would be sold. The park will consist of open-air amphitheatre, drive-in cinema, swings for kids, lake for boating and cafeteria etc.

== Events ==
There have been cases of people committing suicide by jumping off the Barrage bridge.

== Panoramic view ==
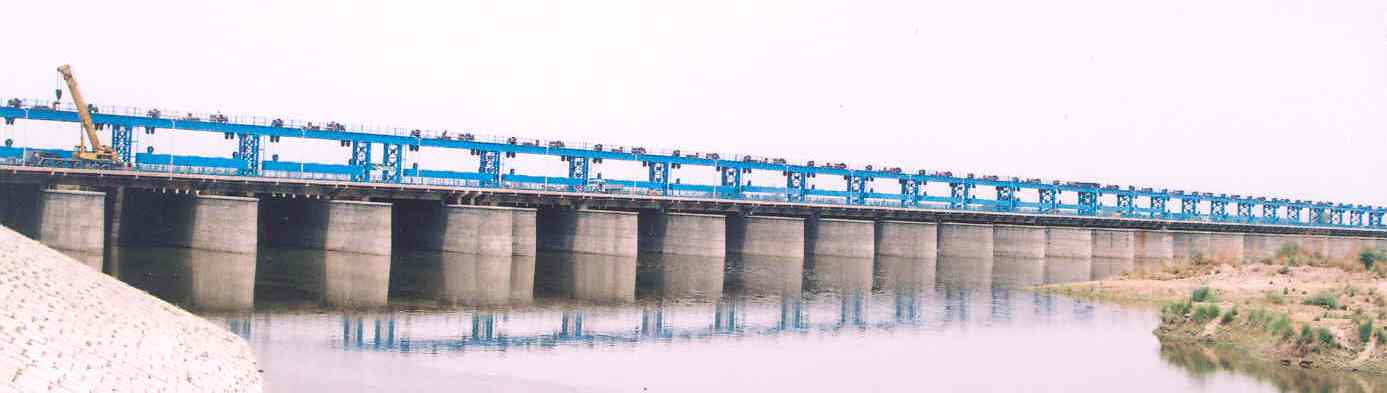
Ganges Barrage, part of the NH-91 by-pass
