= Tunga Bridge =

River bridge of British India

Coordinates: 13.6847°N 75.2479°E

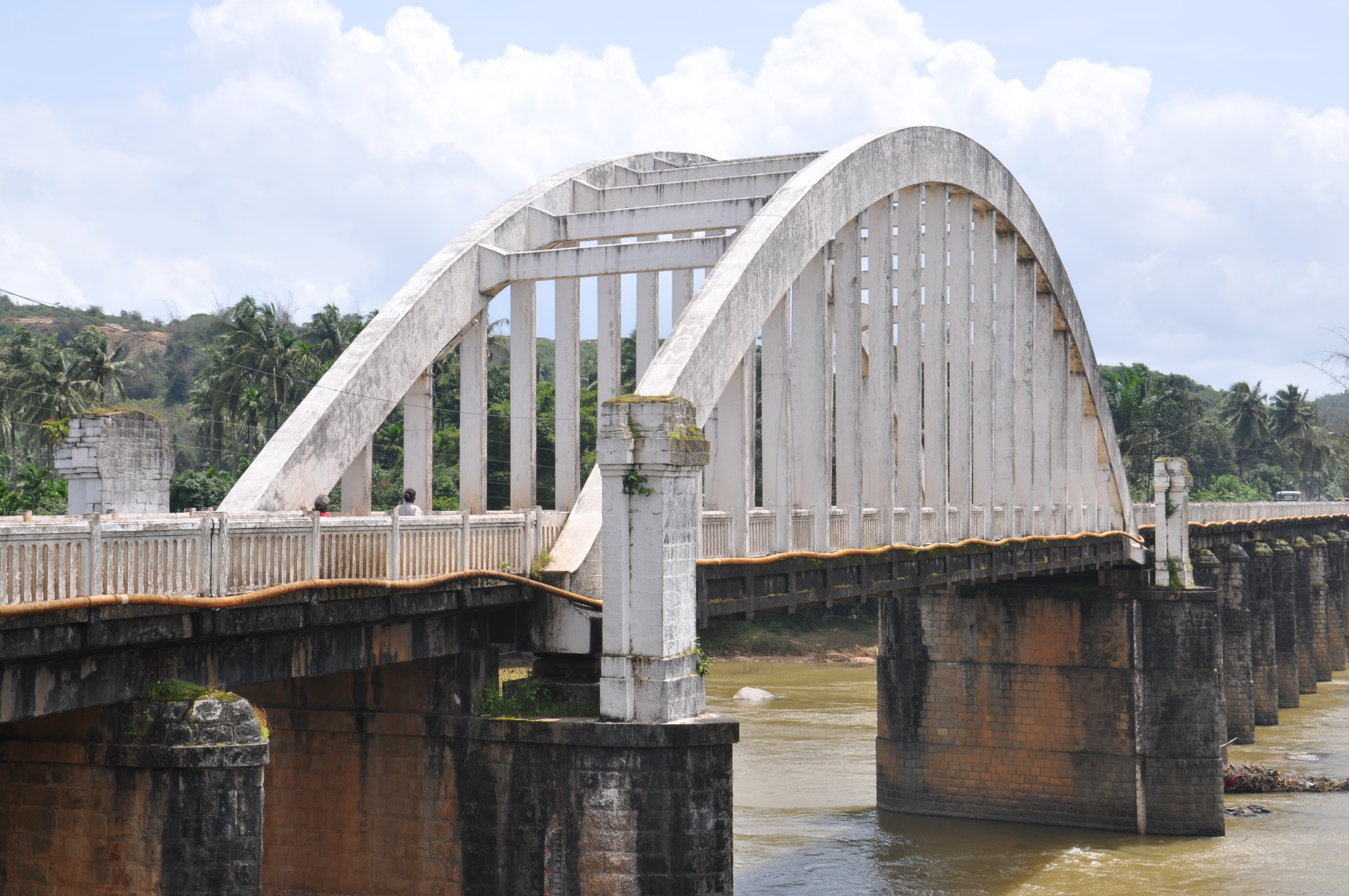
Tunga bridge (side view)

Tunga Bridge in Thirthahalli, Karnataka, India, is one of the oldest bridges across the Tunga River connecting Thirthahalli with Kuruvalli.

== Bridge structure ==
This is an Arch-bridge which stands 53.38 feet high, 761.25 feet long, and 26.25 feet wide. It consists of 16 arches, with a span of 53.13 feet between each arch.

== History ==
The British Commissioner in the court of the Mysore Maharaja, J. D. Gordon, conceived the project of constructing a bridge across the Tunga River in 1868. The construction was entrusted to a British officer, Colonel Swoakes, who commenced the work in the same year and completed it in 1871 at a cost of ₹1.75 lakh.

News Papers dated May 20, 2026 carried a news that local leaders demanding replacement of this historic bridge with a modern flyover which resulted in a sparked debate, with heritage activists advocating for its preservation due to its historical and architectural significance.
