= Aunta-Simaria Bridge =

Six-lane road bridge in Bihar, India

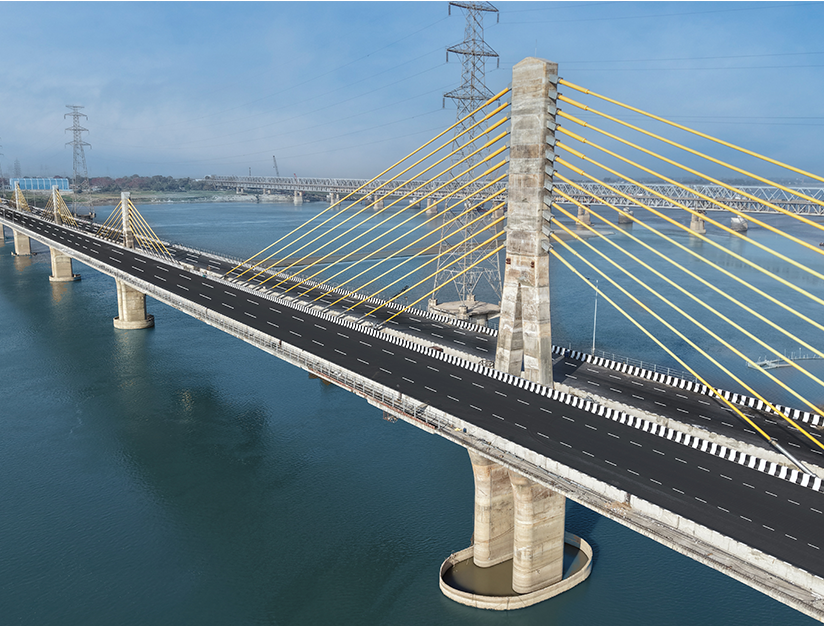
- Six Lane Cable Bridge
- Coordinates: 25°22′20″N 86°00′02″E
- Carries: National Highway 31 (India)
- Crosses: Ganges
- Locale: Barauni, Mokama
- Official name: Barauni-Mokama Six Lane Ganga Bridge

Characteristics
- Design: Cable bridge
- Total length: 8,000 metres (26,000 ft)

History
- Engineering design by: SP Singla Building Private Limited Company

Statistics
- Daily traffic: Six Lane Road Bridge

Location
- Interactive map of Aunta-Simaria Bridge

The Aunta-Simaria Bridge, also known as the Barauni–Mokama Six Lane Ganga Bridge, is a major infrastructure project in Begusarai and Patna districts in Bihar, India, that is designed to improve connectivity and reduce travel time between North and South Bihar. The bridge opened on 22 August 2025.

== Description ==
The bridge is expected to reduce travel time and distance between North and South Bihar, including areas like Darbhanga, Samastipur, Saharsa, Patna and Buxar. It uses a cable-stayed system to support its weight. It has six lanes (three lanes in each direction) as well as wide footpaths on either side, for pedestrians, cyclists, and two-wheelers.

== Construction ==
Construction has faced delays, including those due to the COVID-19 pandemic and rising water levels.
