= Sharavati Bridge =

- Coordinates: 14.264498°N 74.462720°E
- Carries: Konkan Railway
- Crosses: Sharavati river
- Locale: Honnavar, Karnataka, India

Characteristics
- Total length: 2,060 metres (6,760 ft)

History
- Construction end: 1994

Location
- Interactive map of Sharavati Bridge

The Sharavati Bridge is a railway bridge, south of Honnavar, in the state of Karnataka, India, completed in 1994. It carries the Konkan Railway over the Sharavati river.

It is 2,060 metres (6,760 ft) long, and is the longest bridge on that railway, and the longest railway bridge in the state.

The work consisted of construction of a 2,060-metre-long (6,760 ft) bridge having 55 spans of 33 m and 11 spans of 22 m. The foundation consists of four 1.2-metre-diameter (3.9 ft) cast-in-situ R.C.C. bored piles for piers and eight 1.2-metre-diameter piles for abutments. The superstructure was with a single post-tensioned box girder for 33 m spans and three precast pretensioned I girders for 22 m spans. This bridge at Honnavar was awarded second prize in the competition for Most outstanding Bridge National Awards 1995 – Category I by Indian Institute of Bridge Engineers in 1995.

== Sharavati Road Bridge ==
The bridge was constructed in 1984 with an overall length of 1047.65 meters, comprises 34 spans of 30 meters each. The two end spans are balanced cantilever arms. Each main span consists of five prestressed "I" girders placed on hammerheads.

=== Rehabilitation ===
The rehabilitation of the bridge was carried out by Freyssinet Prestressed Concrete Company Ltd (FPCC) by strengthening the piers and hammerheads with additional steel brackets and external prestressing of main girders. The load test carried out to assess residual prestress in the girders.
