= New Yamuna Bridge =

Cable-Stayed Bridge in Prayagraj, Uttar Pradesh

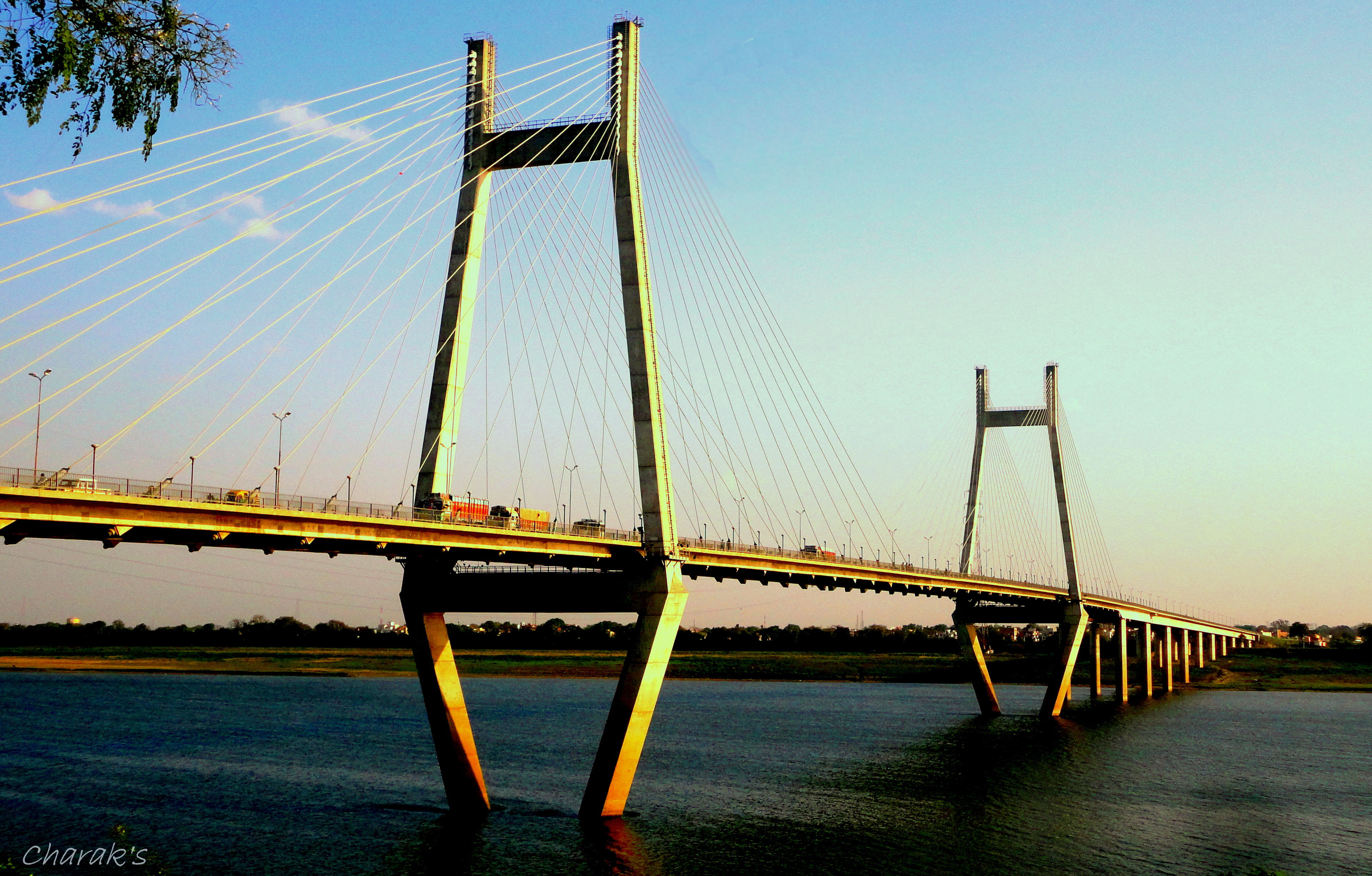
- Coordinates: 25.4272°N 81.8613°E
- Carries: 4 lanes, pedestrians and bicycles
- Locale: Prayagraj, India
- Official name: Syama Prasad Mukherjee Setu

Characteristics
- Design: Cable-stayed bridge
- Material: Steel
- Total length: 1,510 metres (4,954 ft)
- Width: 250
- Longest span: 260 metres (853 ft)

History
- Designer: Hindustan Construction Company and Hyundai Engineering and Construction
- Construction start: 2000
- Construction end: 2004

Location
- Interactive map of New Yamuna Bridge

The New Yamuna Bridge is a cable-stayed bridge located in Prayagraj. The bridge was constructed by the end of 2004 with the aim of minimizing the traffic over the Old Naini Bridge. The bridge runs north–south across the Yamuna River connecting the city of Prayagraj to its neighborhood of Naini. The construction was consulted by COWI A/S, a Danish consulting company. Main construction was done by Hyundai and was successfully completed in 2004. The structure spans 1,510 meters with a main span of 260 meters, featuring six traffic lanes and pedestrian walkways.

== History ==
The New Yamuna Bridge was constructed to ease congestion from the older Naini Bridge and improve connectivity between Prayagraj and Naini, especially due to increasing commuter and pilgrimage traffic. The construction began in the early 2000s and the bridge was completed in 2004, officially opened for public use the same year. It was built by Hyundai Engineering and Construction with engineering consultation from COWI A/S, a Danish engineering consultancy with expertise in large-scale civil projects. The project was one of India's earliest modern cable-stayed bridges, reflecting a shift toward international infrastructure collaboration and urban modernization in northern India.

== Structural Specifications ==
The New Yamuna bridge is a cable-stayed structure with a main span of 260 m and a total length of 1,510 m, designed to withstand high vehicular loads while minimizing disruption to the Yamuna River's flow. It features a six-lane carriageway, with two additional pedestrian walkways flanking both sides, accommodating both motor and foot traffic. The pylons rise to a height of 151 meters, with cables arranged in a harp pattern, that us visually enhancing the Prayagraj skyline while ensuring even load distribution. The bridge is built using prestressed concrete and steel, and designed to accommodate high seismic resilience, a critical feature for long-span bridges in India.

== Gallery ==
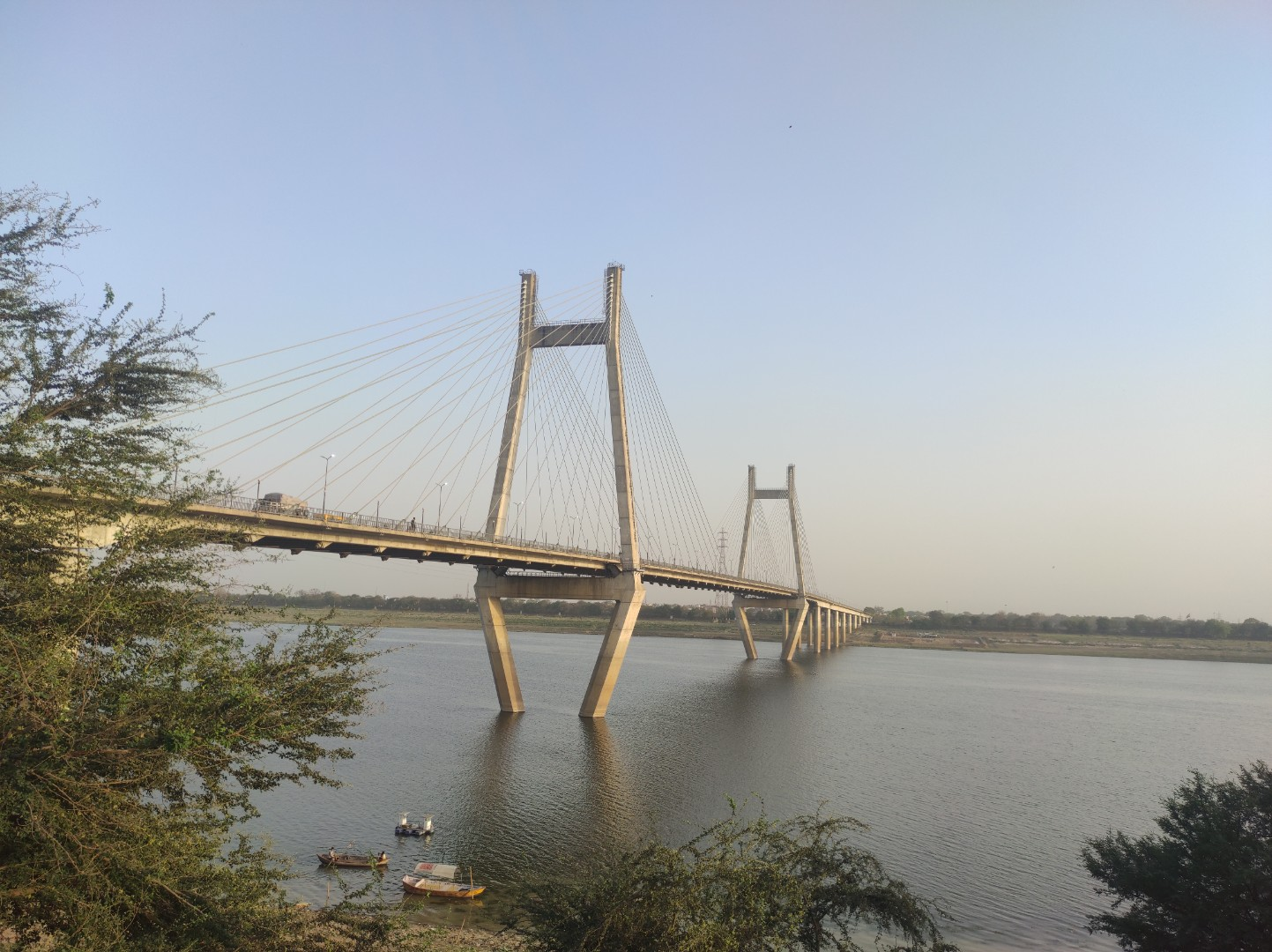
Clicked by Salim Ansari

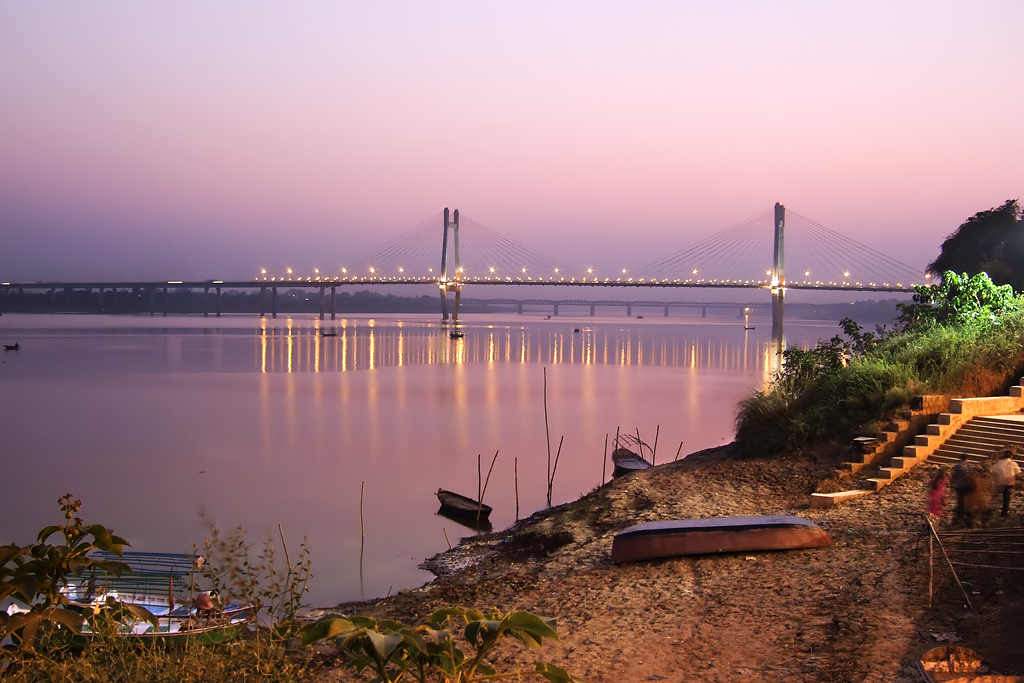
New Yamuna Bridge at dusk

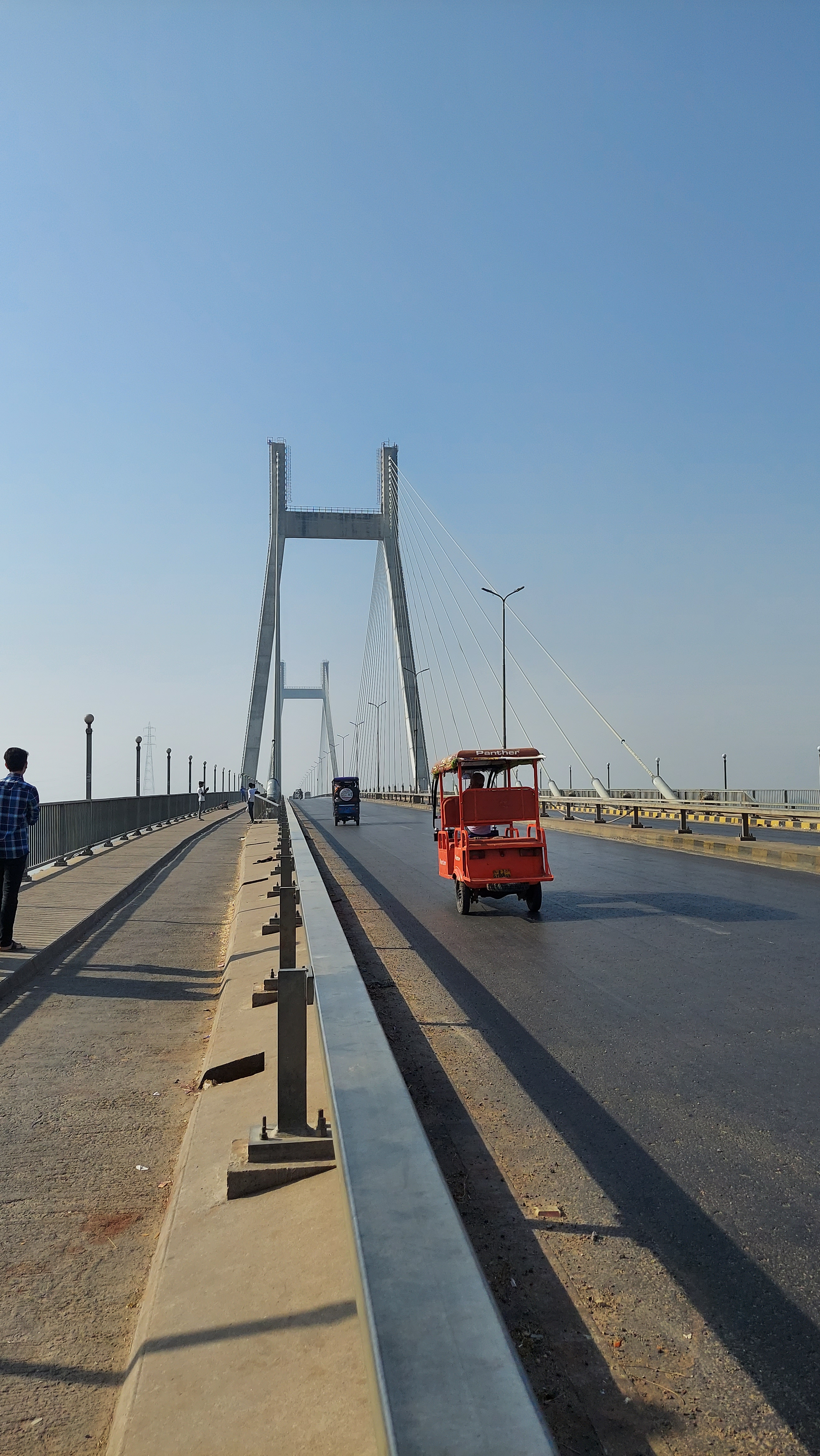
Naini Bridge Prayagraj

== See also ==
- List of tourist attractions in Prayagraj
- List of largest cable-stayed bridges in the World
- List of longest bridges above water in India
- List of bridges in India
- List of bridges
- Old Naini Bridge
