= Sadarghat Bridge =

Bridge in Assam, India

Coordinates: 24.8306°N 92.8052°E

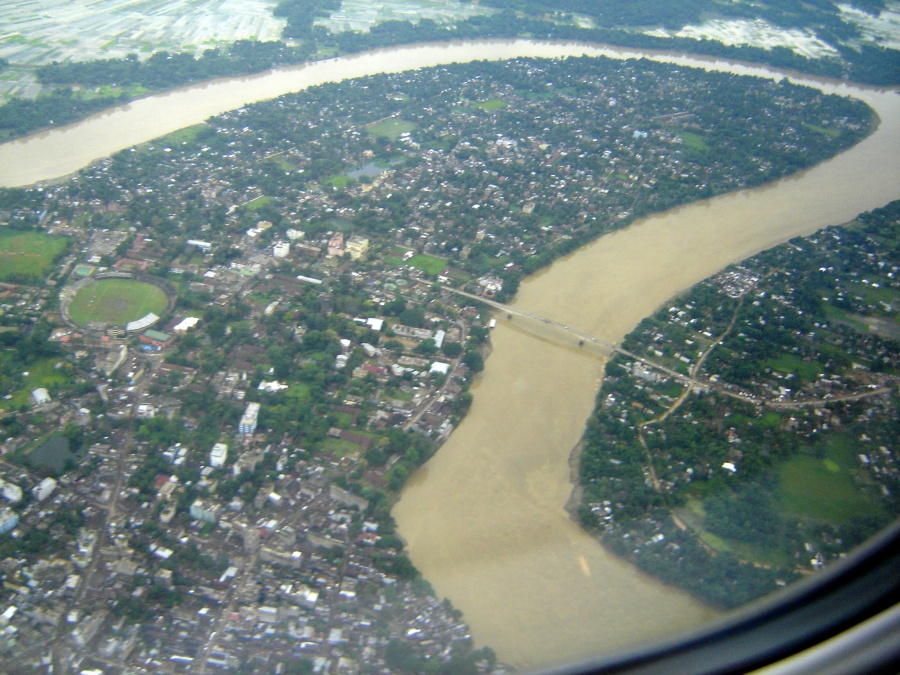
Aerial view of Sadarghat Bridge

Sadarghat Bridge is a bridge in Silchar city of Assam, India, which crosses the Barak River. This bridge is the only bridge built on the Barak River in Silchar city. The bridge is the only way to reach Kumbhirgram Airport, Silchar from Silchar.
