= Rajendra Setu =

Rail-cum-road bridge in Bihar, India

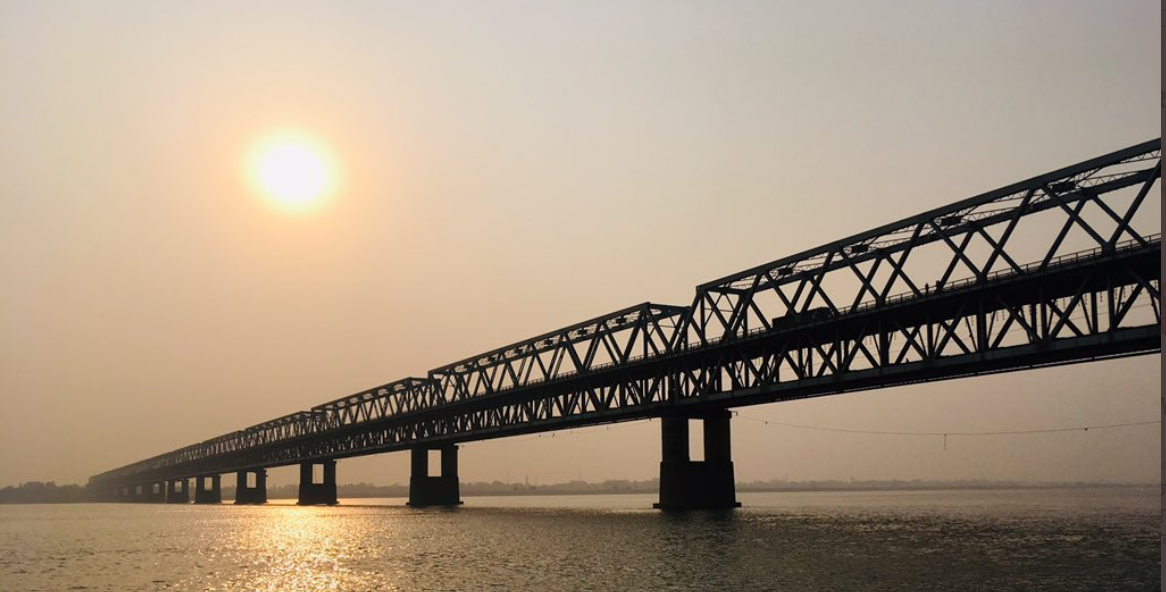
- Rajendra Setu from Simaria Ghat
- Coordinates: 25°22′32″N 85°59′54″E
- Carries: Mokama–Barauni section rail track, NH 31
- Crosses: Ganges
- Locale: Barauni, Mokama
- Official name: Rajendra Setu
- Other name: Simaria Pul
- Named for: Rajendra Prasad

Characteristics
- Design: Girder bridge
- Total length: 2,000 metres (6,600 ft)
- No. of spans: 14 x 400 ft 4 x 100 ft

History
- Engineering design by: Braithwaite, Burn & Jessop Construction Company
- Opened: May 1959

Statistics
- Daily traffic: Double road track & Single line rail track
- Toll: no

Location
- Interactive map of Rajendra Setu

Rajendra Setu, or Simaria Bridge, is a bridge across the Ganges that was the first to link the northern and southern portions of the state of Bihar. The location of the bridge was based on the work of M. Visvesvaraya, who was more than 90 years old at the time. In a wheelchair, he visited the bridge site on the special request of Bihar's 1st chief minister, Dr. Shri Krishna Sinha. It was the first bridge over the Ganges to be built in independent India.

The foundation stone of this bridge was laid by Rajendra Prasad in Presence of CM Dr. Srikrishna Sinha alias "Bihar Keshri" & "Sri Babu" on 26 February 1956 in the seventh year of India's independence.

The road-cum-rail bridge near Hathidah in Patna district and Simaria in Begusarai district was inaugurated in 1959 by Jawaharlal Nehru, prime minister of India, and Chief Minister Dr. Shri Krishna Sinha . The bridge was constructed by Braithwaite, Burn & Jessop Construction Company in just Three and Half years. It is about 2 kilometres (1 1/4 mi) long and carries a two-lane road and a single-line railway track.

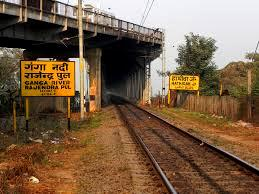
Rajendra Setu (carrying single broad gauge electrified railway line at bottom)

Due to poor maintenance, it has been damaged, and a new bridge, carrying the four-lane NH 31 and double-track rail, 25 metres (80 ft) upstream from the existing rail and road bridge, was planned in 2011.

The construction of the new parallel double-line railway bridge was inaugurated by prime minister Narendra Modi on 12 March 2016. The new 1.9 km (1.2 mi) railway bridge was supposed to be operational by February 2021, but is now expected to be operational by 2026. The contract for construction of the new bridge was awarded to M/s AFCONS Infrastructure Ltd by the Indian Railway Construction International Limited (IRCON) on an EPC contract basis. A new six-lane road bridge (Aunta-Simaria bridge), which has a span of 34 metres (112 ft), parallel to it, became operational in August 2025 after formal inauguration by prime minister Narendra Modi.

The New Mokama Bridge officers are assigned CGM Mahesh Kumar and AGM Vishnu Dev Tripathi oversaw the construction of the new Rajendra Setu. At the site, the project was executed under the leadership of Shri Sham Kumar and Mahendra Pal for the main Ganga bridge, and Vikas Kumar and Siddharth Sonker for the viaduct.

== See also ==
- List of bridges in India
- List of longest bridges above water in India
- List of longest bridges in the world
- Digha–Sonpur bridge
