= List of longest bridges above water in India =

This is a list of India's bridges longer than 2 km (1.2 mi), sorted by their length.

== List of bridges ==
Rank	Name	Image	Water body	Length (km)	Life span	Traffic	State	Town(s)
1	Atal Setu		Arabian Sea	18.19	2024-	Road	Maharashtra	Mumbai
2	Kacchi Dargah–Bidupur Bridge		Ganges River	9.76	2025-	Road	Bihar	Patna-Bidupur
3	Bhupen Hazarika Setu		Lohit River	9.15	2017-	Road	Arunachal Pradesh, Assam	Dhola-Sadiya
4	Dibang River Bridge		Dibang River	6.2	2018-	Road	Arunachal Pradesh	Bomjir-Malek
5	Mahatma Gandhi Setu		Ganges River	5.75	1982-	Road	Bihar	Patna–Hajipur
6	Bandra–Worli Sea Link		Mahim Bay	5.57	2009-	Road	Maharashtra	Mumbai
7	Bogibeel Bridge		Brahmaputra River	4.94	2018-	Rail-cum-road	Assam	Dhemaji-Dibrugarh
8	Vikramshila Setu		Ganges River	4.70	2001-	Road	Bihar	Bhagalpur-Mahadeopur
9	Vembanad Rail Bridge		Vembanad Lake	4.62	2011	Rail	Kerala	Kochi
10	Jayaprakash Setu		Ganges River	4.56	2016	Rail-cum-road	Bihar	Patna–Sonpur
11	Arrah–Chhapra Bridge		Ganges River	4.35	2017-	Road	Bihar	Arrah–Chhapra
12	Godavari Fourth Bridge		Godavari River	4.14	2015-	Road	Andhra Pradesh	Rajahmundry
13	Sri Krishna Setu		Ganges River	3.75	2020-	Rail-cum-road	Bihar	Munger-Shaligrami
14	Chahlari Ghat Bridge		Ghaghra River	3.26	2017-	Road	Uttar Pradesh	Bahraich–Sitapur
15	Jawahar Setu		Sone River	3.06	1965-	Road	Bihar	Dehri-Son Nagar
16	Nehru Setu		Sone River	3.06	1900	Rail	Bihar	Dehri-Son Nagar
17	Kolia Bhomora Setu		Brahmaputra River	3.04	2021-	Road	Assam	Tezpur–Kaliabor
18	Bhomoraguri-Tezpur Bridge		Brahmaputra River	3.02	1987-	Road	Assam	Bhomoraguri-Tezpur
19	Daudnagar Bridge		Sone River	3.0	2019-	Road	Bihar	Daudnagar-Nasriganj
20	Korthi-Kolhar Bridge		Krishna River	3.0	2006-	Road	Karnataka	Korthi-Kolhar
21	Netaji Subhas Chandra Bose Setu		Kathajodi River	2.88	2017-	Road	Odisha	Cuttack-Trisulia
22	Godavari Bridge		Godavari River	2.79	1974	Rail-cum-road	Andhra Pradesh	Rajahmundry
23	Godavari Arch Bridge		Godavari River	2.75	2003-	Rail	Andhra Pradesh	Rajahmundry
24	Joyee Setu		Teesta River	2.71	2021-	Road	West Bengal	Mekhliganj–Haldibari
25	Penumudi–Puligadda Bridge		Krishna River	2.59	2006-	Road	Andhra Pradesh	Penumudi–Puligadda
26	Sudarshan Setu		Gulf of Kutch	2.32	2024-	Road	Gujarat	Bet Dwarka-Okha
27	Farakka Barrage		Ganges River	2.30	1975	Rail-cum-road	West Bengal	Farakka
28	Naranarayan Setu		Brahmaputra River	2.28	1998	Rail-cum-road	Assam	Jogighopa-Pancharatna
29	Pamban Road Bridge		Palk Strait	2.2	1988-	Road	Tamil Nadu	Mandapam-Rameswaram
30	Kanaka Durga Varadhi		Krishna River	2.2	1995-	Road	Andhra Pradesh	Vijayawada
31	Mahanadi Rail Bridge		Mahanadi River	2.1	1902-	Rail	Odisha	Cuttack
32	Second Mahanadi Rail Bridge		Mahanadi River	2.1	2008-	Rail	Odisha	Cuttack
33	Pamban Bridge		Palk Strait	2.07	1913-2022	Rail	Tamil Nadu	Mandapam-Rameswaram
33	New Pamban Bridge		Palk Strait	2.07	2025-	Rail	Tamil Nadu	Mandapam-Rameswaram
35	Sharavati Bridge		Sharavathi River	2.06	1994	Rail	Karnataka	Honnavar-Kasarkoda
36	Baluaha Ghat Bridge		Kosi River	2.05	2015-	Road	Bihar	Baluaha Ghat-Gandaul
37	Arwal Sahar Bridge		Sone River	2.04	2012-	Road	Bihar	Arwal-Sahar
38	Rajendra Setu		Ganges River	2.03	1959	Rail-cum-road	Bihar	Barauni–Hathidah

== Under construction ==
Rank	Name	Water body	Length (km)	Expected opening	Traffic	State	Town(s)
1	Dhubri-Phulbari bridge	Brahmaputra River	19.36	2028	Road	Assam	Dhubri-Phulbari
2	Sahibganj - Manihari Bridge	Ganges River	6.25	2027	Road	Jharkhand-Bihar	Sahibganj-Manihari
3	Farakka Setu	Ganges River	5.468	2025	Road	West Bengal	Vaishnavnagar-Farakka
4	Gangasagar Setu	Muri Ganga River	4.857	2031	Road	West Bengal	Kakdwip-Gangasagar

== See also ==
- List of longest bridges
- List of road–rail bridges
- List of bridges in India
- List of longest bridges in West Bengal
