= Amod =

Amod may refer to:

- Amod (SugandhPur), a town in the Bharuch district, Gujarat, India
- Amod Field (born 1967), American football player
- Sheraan Amod (b. 1985), a South African internet entrepreneur
- Amod, Gujarat, a town and capital of a taluka in Bharuch district, Gujarat, India
- Amod (newspaper), a major weekly newspaper published in Bangladesh
