= Ankleshwar Airport =

Bharuch - Ankleshwar Airport
- IATA: none; ICAO: none

Summary
- Airport type: Public
- Location: Andada Ankleshwar near mandava village
- Coordinates: 21°39′38″N 73°03′24″E

Maps
- Location of the airport in Gujarat Bharuch - Ankleshwar Airport (India)
- Interactive map of Bharuch - Ankleshwar Airport

Bharuch - Ankleshwar Airport is a greenfield airport being constructed at village Mandvabuzarg on National Highway 8 near Ankleshwar, Gujarat, India.

The Airports Authority of India has cleared the techno-economic feasibility report for the proposed airfield and was expected to be operational by December 2026. The Gujarat State Aviation Infrastructure Company Limited has acquired 80 hectares of land for the construction of the airport. The Airport Authority signed a memorandum of understanding with the State Government in January 2019 for the construction of airport and a maintenance, repair and overhaul unit spread over 92 hectares. Bharuch-Ankleshwar Airport is expected to handle 10% of India's total air cargo.

The airport will serve Ankleshwar, Bharuch, the Jagadia and Panoli Industrial areas, the Dahej SEZ and the upcoming Petroleum Chemical and Petrochemical Investment Region. The Ankleshwar Industries Association had proposed the construction of the airport to the State Government in 1995. The Gujarat Industrial Development Corporation had agreed to construct the airstrip and terminal, but the project was eventually referred to the Gujarat Industrial Development Board.

The foundation stone for the new airport was laid on 10 October 2022 by Prime Minister Narendra Modi.
