= Keki Hormusji Gharda =

Indian chemical engineer (1929–2024)

- Born: 25 September 1929; Bombay, Bombay Presidency, British India
- Died: 30 September 2024 (aged 95)
- Education: UDCT (Bachelors in Chemical Engineering); University of Michigan, Ann Arbor (PhD)
- Occupation: Chemical Industrialist
- Organization: Gharda Chemicals
- Awards: Padma Shri; Chemical Pioneer Award

Keki Hormusji Gharda (25 September 1929 – 30 September 2024) was an Indian chemical engineer, chemist and businessman. He was the founder, chairman and managing director of Gharda Chemicals Limited, a R&D-based company with business interests in agrochemicals, polymers, and high performance pigments. He was honoured by the Government of India with the award of Padma Shri in 2016.

== Early life ==
Gharda was born on 25 September 1929, to Hormusji and Ratanbai in a Kadmi Zoroastrian Parsi family in Mumbai. He attended St. Stanislaus High School, in Bandra, Bombay, graduating in 1941. He acquired Bachelor of Science, and Bachelor of Technology Degree from University Department of Chemical Technology at the University of Bombay (now the Institute of Chemical Technology). He then obtained a master's degree and PhD in chemical engineering from the University of Michigan, Ann Arbor in 1952 and 1959, respectively. He also studied at the University of Oklahoma.

== Career ==
Gharda began his career as an assistant professor, Process Design and Chemical Engineering at the University of Oklahoma. During this time he was granted his first two patents for projects he undertook for an oil company.

Upon his return to India, Gharda briefly taught as a visiting faculty member at UDCT and then established Gharda Chemicals. His strategy of producing off-patent at extremely cheap prices led to successful start for the company. His move into agrochemicals was a result of being invited to be an observer of an investigation by the Monopolies and Restrictive Trade Practices Commission into an alleged monopolistic product. However, his foray in bulk drug production was not successful.

Among his many awards, Gharda was elected to be a Fellow of the Indian Academy of Sciences in 1976 in the field of Process Design. Other awards include the Distinguished Alumnus award by the UDCT and the Indian Chemical Councils Lifetime Achievement Award. For his contribution to chemistry and chemical engineering, Gharda was a recipient of the American Institute of Chemists's Chemical Pioneer Award. He also got the Federation of Indian Chambers of Commerce And Industry (FICCI) Award For Research And Technology for the Development And Commercialisation of Poly Ether Ether Ketone (PEEK).

== Gharda Chemicals Ltd. ==
Gharda Chemicals Limited, established in 1967, is a research and development company manufacturing agrochemicals, high performance pigments, and high performance polymers. It has five manufacturing units located across the country at Dombivli in Mumbai, Lote Parshuram in Khed (Maharashtra), Panoli and Ankleshwar, Saykha, Bharuch in Gujarat and Samba in Jammu.

Innovation through research and development has seen the company rise from a rented shed in 1964 to a leadership position in the agrochemical industry. The company was valued at over ₹1,200 crore in the early 2000s by Dupont, which had tried to acquire it. In 2009, the turnover and profits were roughly ₹1,000 crore and ₹100 crore. In 2018, the company had a turnover of ₹950-crore and valuation of the privately held company was estimated at anywhere in the range of ₹3,000-9,000 crore.

== Personal life ==
Gharda was married to Abaan, who was a graduate of St. Xavier's College and also earned a PhD from the University of Mumbai. She died in 2017. He was an avid reader and had promoted Bai Ratnabai Gharda Library in Bandra, Mumbai. Gharda had said that he followed a frugal lifestyle.

Gharda was also known for his philanthropic contributions, with the first foundation started in 1966. The Abaan and Keki Gharda Memorial Trust named after his wife and him was formed in 2009 and receives 99% of the proceeds from the sale of his shares in the company. He had promoted the Gharda Scientific Research Foundation, a non-profit limited-liability company, dedicated to develop and research basic technologies. The aim is to use the earnings of this foundation to promote more technologies in the areas of health and education. He also founded the Gharda Institute of Technology§ in Ratnagiri District, Maharashtra.

Gharda died on 30 September 2024, at the age of 95.
