= Sir Anerood Jugnauth Bridge =

Bridge in Mauritius

Coordinates: 20.2082°S 57.4730°E

Sir Anerood Jugnauth Bridge (SAJ Bridge) is an extradosed bridge in northwestern Mauritius. It carries the M1 motorway and the A1 road across the Grand River North West valley between Chebel and Sorèze. The bridge is the highest in Mauritius and was described at its inauguration as the first bridge of its type in the Sub-Saharan region.

Named after former prime minister and president Anerood Jugnauth, the bridge was constructed between 2018 and 2024 as part of the A1–M1 Link Road project. It officially opened to traffic on 11 March 2024 and was built to improve transport between western, central and northern Mauritius while reducing congestion on existing roads.

== History ==
The bridge forms part of the Government of Mauritius' Road Decongestion Programme. Construction began on 11 April 2018 with the aim of creating a direct connection between the A1 road and the M1 motorway.

The project cost approximately Rs 1.786 billion and encountered delays due to the technical complexity of the structure, the COVID-19 pandemic and land acquisition issues before being completed in February 2024.

The bridge was inaugurated on 10 March 2024 and opened to motorists the following day.

== Design ==
The SAJ Bridge is an extradosed bridge measuring approximately 330 metres (1,080 ft) in length and 120 metres (390 ft) above the valley floor, making it the highest bridge in Mauritius.

Its design incorporates two pylons supporting the bridge deck with seven cable stays on each pylon. The bridge was designed with international engineering expertise and is the only bridge of its type in the western Indian Ocean.

== Impact ==
The bridge provides a direct crossing of the Grand River North West valley, reducing travel times between western Mauritius, the central plateau and Port Louis. It forms a key component of the national road network and was built to improve traffic flow while reducing fuel consumption and congestion on surrounding roads.

Following its opening, the Minister of National Infrastructure reported in the National Assembly that traffic volumes had decreased on several major roads and junctions, with shorter travel times recorded during peak hours.
