= Silver Bridge (disambiguation) =

The Silver Bridge was a United States bridge that spanned the Ohio River from 1928 until it collapsed in 1967.

Silver Bridge or Silverbridge may also refer to

- Silver Memorial Bridge, the replacement for the above bridge, opened in 1969.
- Silverbridge, County Armagh, a village in Northern Ireland
- Silverbridge Harps GFC, a Gaelic football club in County Armagh

== Literature ==
- The Silver Bridge, a book linking the collapse of the Silver Bridge and the paranormal, by Gray Barker
- The Silver Bridge, a collection of poetry by Elizabeth Akers Allen
- "Silverbridge" is a fictional location in the Palliser novels by Anthony Trollope

== Music ==
- "Silver Bridge", a song by Suzanne Vega from her 2014 album Tales from the Realm of the Queen of Pentacles

== See also ==
- Silver Jubilee Bridge, in Halton, England
- Silver Jubilee Railway Bridge Bharuch, in India
- Silver Street Bridge, in Cambridge, England
