= Lote, India =

Lote Maharashtra Industrial Development Corporation (MIDC) area is located in the Khed taluka, in the Ratnagiri district of Maharashtra state in India. It is adjacent to Dhamandevi village. They export to the Americas and Europe.

Factories in Lote are predominantly in the chemical industry and include:

- Kansai Nerolac Paints
- Gharda Chemicals Ltd
- NOCIL (Taken over by Dow Chemical Company)
- Pentokey Organy (India) Ltd
- Bhavana Petrochem Pvt. Ltd
- Parco Pharmaceutical and Chemicals
- Shireen Industries
- Ratnagiri Chemicals Pvt. Ltd.
- S. R. Drugs
- Indian Oxalate Ltd.
- Kokan Synthetics & Chemical Pvt.Ltd
- Eltech Fine Chem Pvt.Ltd
- Filtra Catalysts & Chemicals Ltd
- Arpit Investment P.Ltd
- Dow Agrosciences India Pvt Ltd
- Sandvik
- Aimco Pesticides Limited
- Hindustan Unilever Limited
- Parshwa Biotech LLP
- Excel Industries Limited
- Dorf Ketal
