= Plascon =

South African paint manufacturer

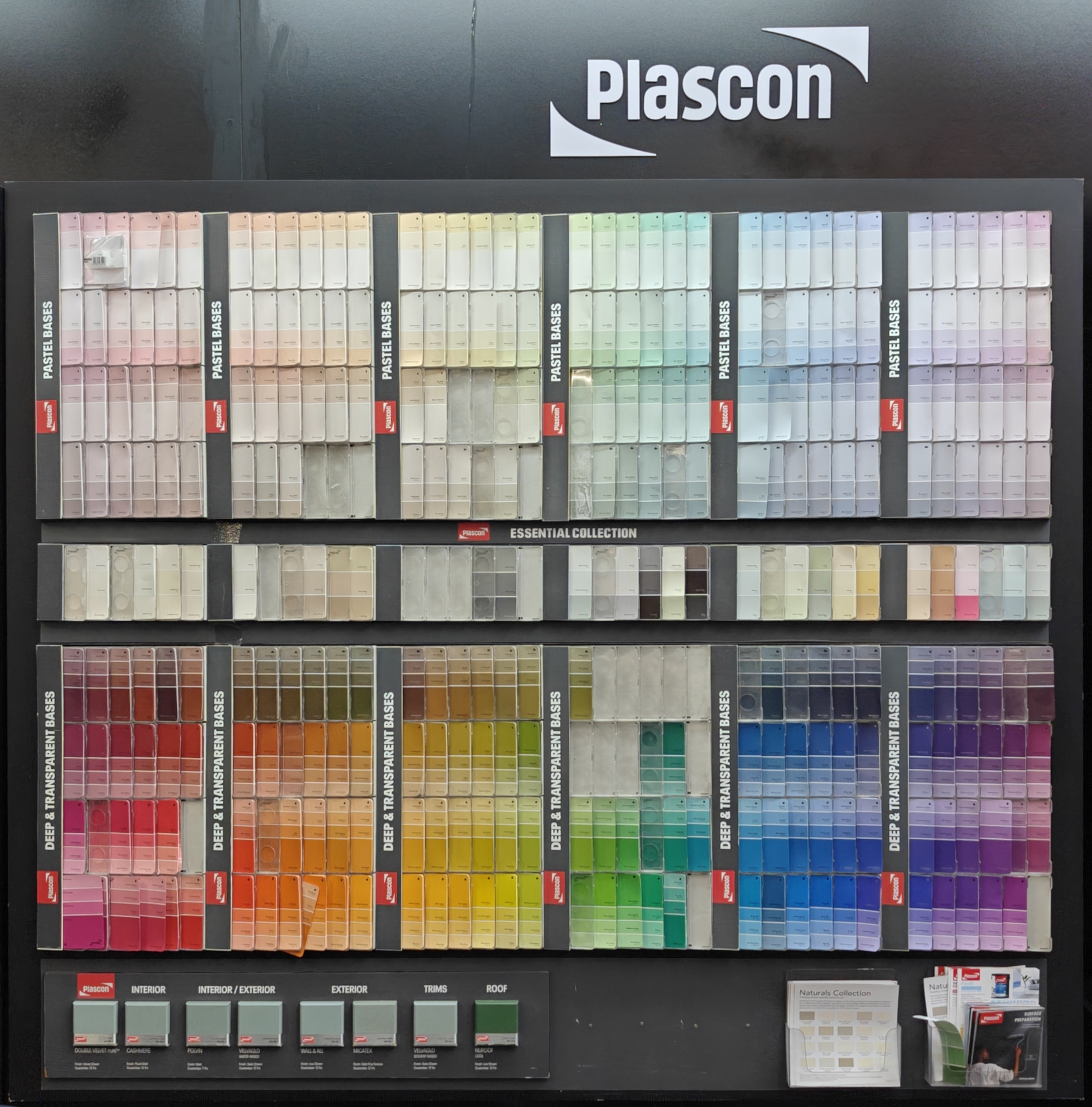
- Plascon paint swatches in a Cape Town home improvement store
- Industry: Paint manufacturing and retail
- Predecessor: Herbert Evans & Co; Parthenon Paints
- Founded: 1889; 137 years ago
- Headquarters: Krugersdorp (Mogale City Local Municipality), Gauteng, South Africa
- Area served: Africa
- Key people: Takashi Tomioka (Chairman); Prejay Lalla (CEO)
- Brands: Double Velvet; Velvaglo; Polvin; Wall & All; NuRoof; Cashmere
- Number of employees: 3,000+ (2025)
- Parent: Kansai Paints
- Website: plascon.co.za

Logo of the Plascon paint brand, which is featured on its products

Plascon (officially Kansai Plascon Africa Ltd) is a major South African paint manufacturer. Based in Krugersdorp, the company is a subsidiary of Japanese corporation Kansai Paints, which is one of the world's 10 largest paint manufacturers.

The company was founded in 1889 as Herbert Evans & Co, and was acquired by Kansai in 2011. Plascon is a prominent brand in the African paint market, competing primarily with Dulux and Duram.

== History ==
Plascon was founded in 1889, when Herbert Evans started a paint manufacturing company in Johannesburg, South Africa. The company was originally called Herbert Evans & Co.

In 1915, the company trademarked Parthenon Paints, and in 1949, joined with Chrome Chemicals to form Plascon.

In 1970, Barloworld (then called Barlo Rand) acquired Plascon. At the time, Plascon was producing 100 million liters of paint a year, making it one of the world's 20 largest paint manufacturers.

In 2007, when Barloworld unbundled, Freeworld Coatings was formed, which owned Plascon.

In 2011, major Japanese paint manufacturer Kansai Paints acquired Plascon, and the following year, the latter's name was changed to Kansai Plascon Africa.

In 2015, the company set up a joint venture in Nigeria, incorporated as Kansai Plascon Nigeria Limited.

The company appointed Farid Masood as its new CEO in 2017. In the same year, Plascon announced its African expansion strategy.

In November 2022, the South African Competition Commission blocked a proposed acquisition of Plascon by AkzoNobel, the Netherlands-based owner of Dulux paint, a major Plascon competitor. The Commission stated that merging South Africa's largest and second-largest paint manufacturers would create a firm that was too dominant in the local market, resulting in a reduction in consumer choice in the paint sector.

== Operations ==
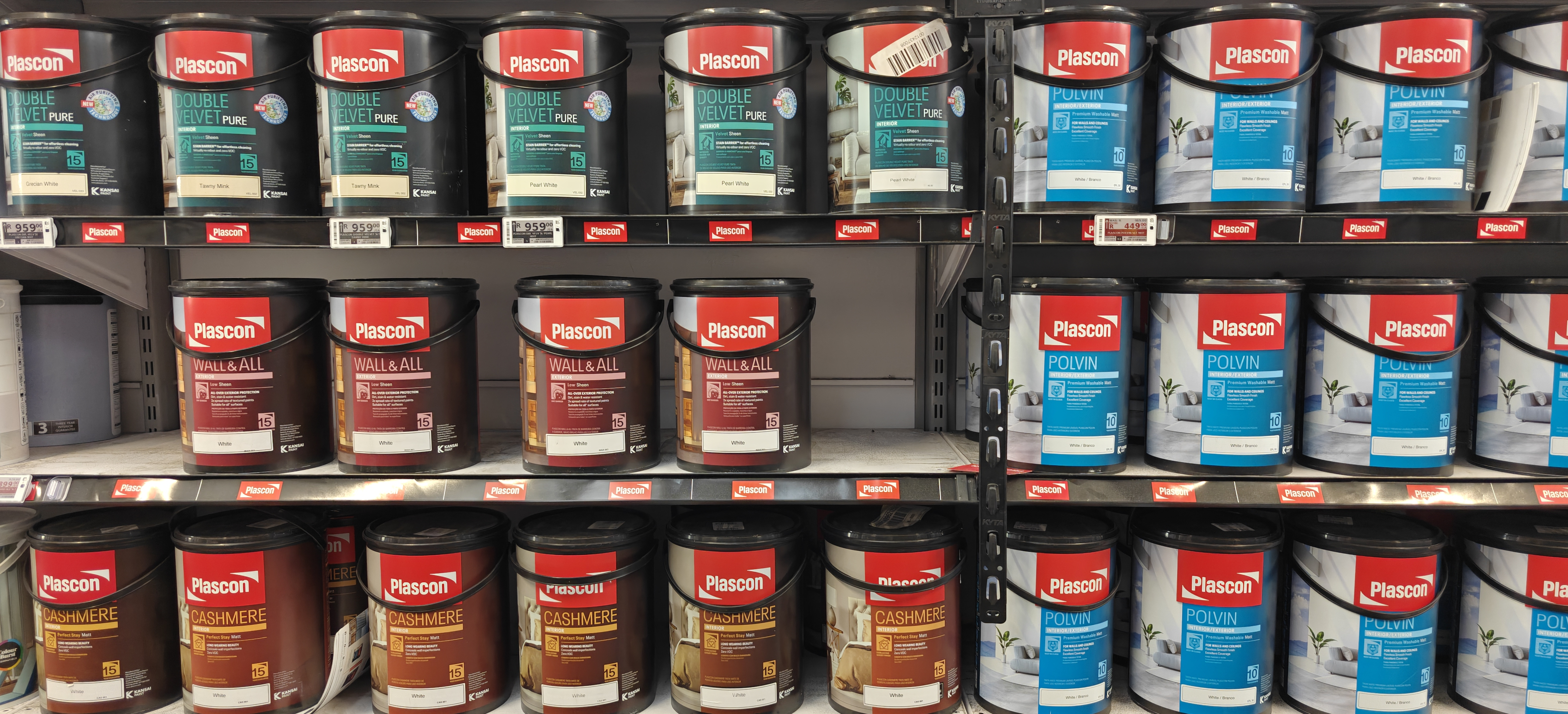
Plascon paint in a Cape Town Builders Warehouse store

Plascon manufactures and sells paint for indoor, outdoor, decorative, industrial, and automotive use.

The company sells its products via independent paint stores, as well as home improvement retail chains, such as Builders Warehouse, Mica, BUCO, and Leroy Merlin in South Africa, and does business across numerous other African countries.

== See also ==
- Economy of South Africa
