= Sarbhan =

Coordinates: 21.9924°N 72.9430°E

Sarbhan is a town-like village situated in Bharuch district in Gujarat state in India. It has a population of about 8000.

== History ==
The village was established by Haavdasji. All Patels of Sarbhan (originally a farming community) descend from Haavdasji to whom they adorn as 'HapaDada'. The foundation stone of the village was laid in year 1224 (Vikram Samvat) on 5th day of full moon period of Aso (आश्विन), or 20 September 1167 AD. The Gram Panchayat of the village was bestowed with an award of 'Most clean village of Gujarat' by Government of Gujarat.

The main part of village is divided into four divisions (Darwaja, Dodh-bhag, Be-bhag, and Tran-bhag) based on the division of property by ancestors. Patels of Sarbhan have migrated within India and all over the world.

Most of the people work in agriculture and the rest are employed in industrial towns nearby. A majority of land is owned by Patels.

== Amenities ==
Sarbhan is the biggest village/town in the Amod Tahesil and all kind of basic needs can be fulfilled within the village itself like food, medical, school, groceries, clothing wares etc.

It has 4 schools offering up to high school, university college in arts & commerce and vocational training institute in various trades. There is a ginning factory as main crop in the area is cotton. This is run by a co-operative society.

It is around 19 km west of Miagao-Karjan on Karjan-Amod road, state highways 161.

Sarbhan has a hospital which has also facility of treating in- as well as out-patients. Facilities include basic diagnostic equipment and an operating theatre.

== Culture ==
The most celebrated festivals of this village are 15 August (independence day of India), 26 January, (Republic day of India), Uttarayan, Holi, Ganesh chaturthi, Navaratri, Janmashtami, and Diwali.
