= Extradosed bridge =

Hybrid bridge

- Diagram of a box girder bridge with internal cables and an extradosed bridge with both internal and external cables
- Span range: Medium
- Material: Concrete
- Movable: No
- Design effort: High
- Falsework required: no

An extradosed bridge employs a structure that combines the main elements of both a prestressed box girder bridge and a cable-stayed bridge. The name comes from the word extrados, the exterior or upper curve of an arch, and refers to how the "stay cables" on an extradosed bridge are not considered as such in the design, but are instead treated as external prestressing tendons deviating upward from the deck. In this concept, they remain part of (and define the upper limit of) the main bridge superstructure.

Compared to a cable-stayed or cantilever-girder bridge of comparable span, an extradosed bridge uses much shorter stay-towers or pylons than the cable-stayed bridge, and a significantly shallower deck/girder structure than used on the girder bridge. This arrangement results in the typical extradosed "look" of a fan of low, shallow-angle stay cables, usually with a pronounced "open window" region extending from the sides of each tower.

The extradosed bridge form is mostly suited to medium-length spans between 100 m (330 ft) and 250 m (820 ft), and over fifty such bridges had been constructed around the world as of 2012. Whilst incurring many of the construction costs of both the cable-stayed and girder bridge types, extradosed bridges can deliver material savings to offset much of this penalty. They have frequently been adopted when overall height, navigation clearance, or aesthetic requirements have made the cable-stayed or girder alternatives less feasible.

== History ==
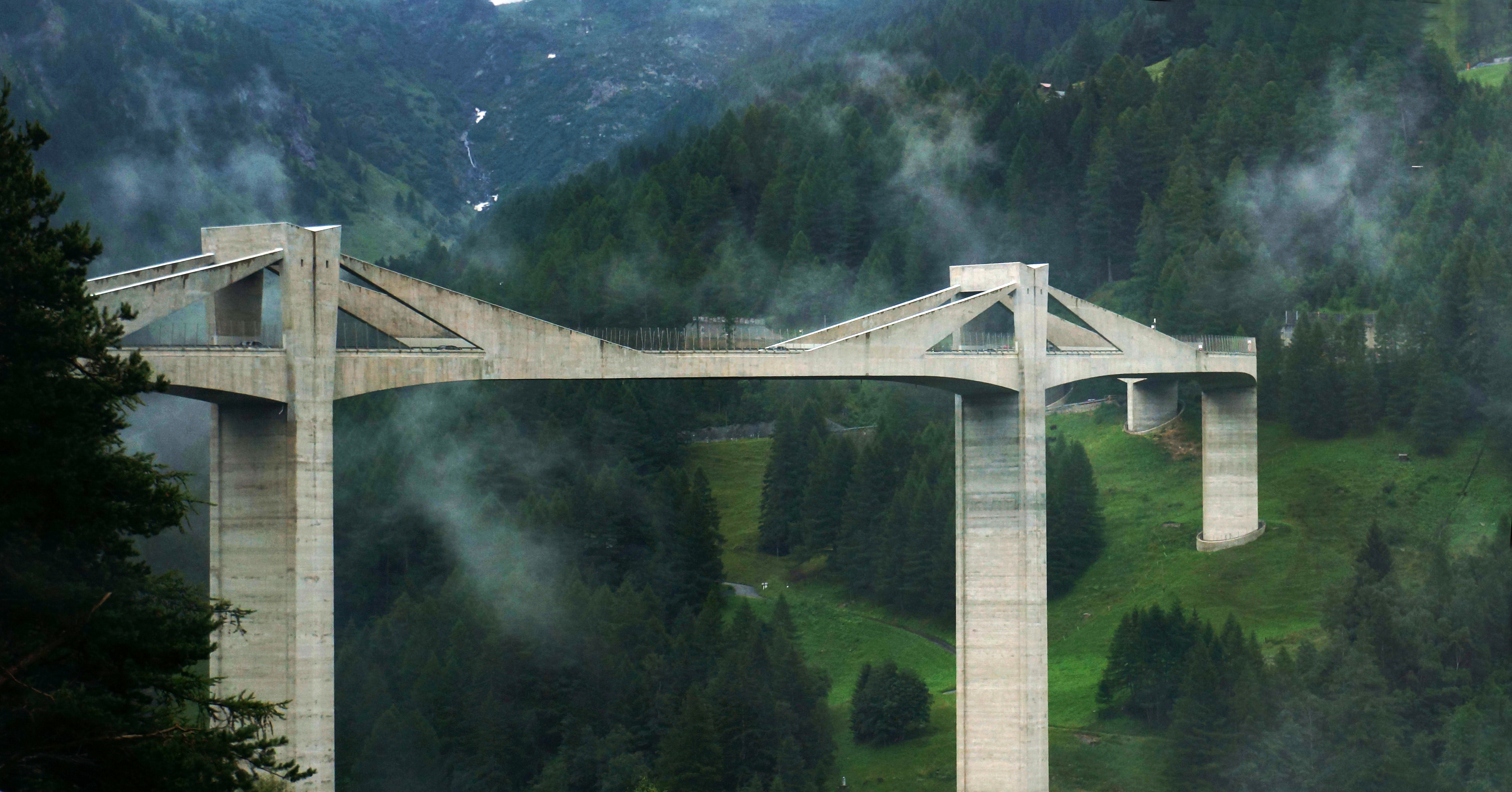
Ganter Bridge, Switzerland. Main span 174 m, 1980.

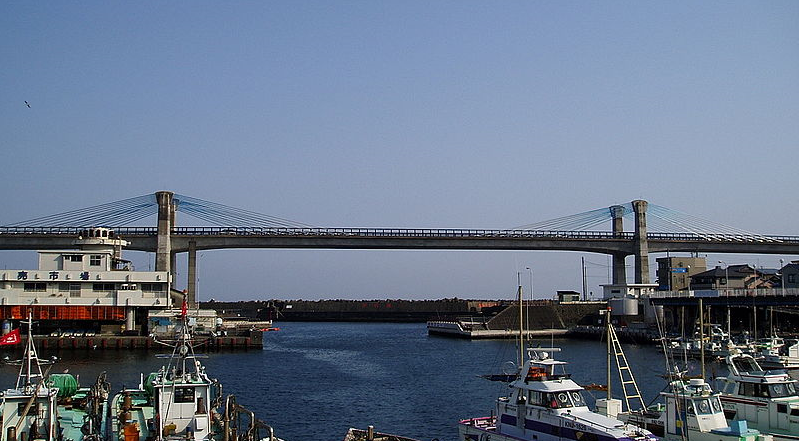
Odawara BlueWay Bridge, Japan. Main span 122 m, 1994.

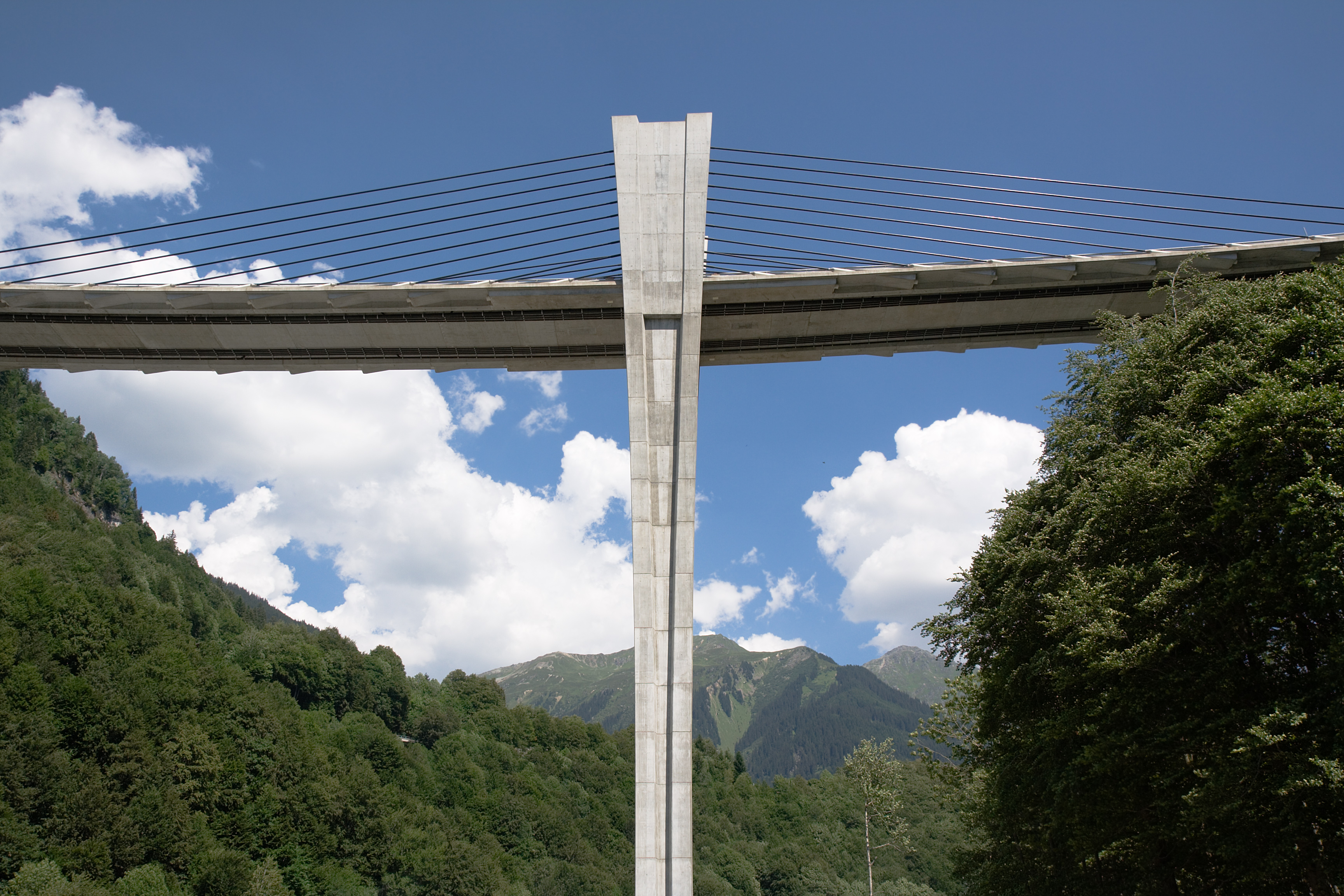
Sunniberg Bridge, Switzerland Main spans 140 m, 1998

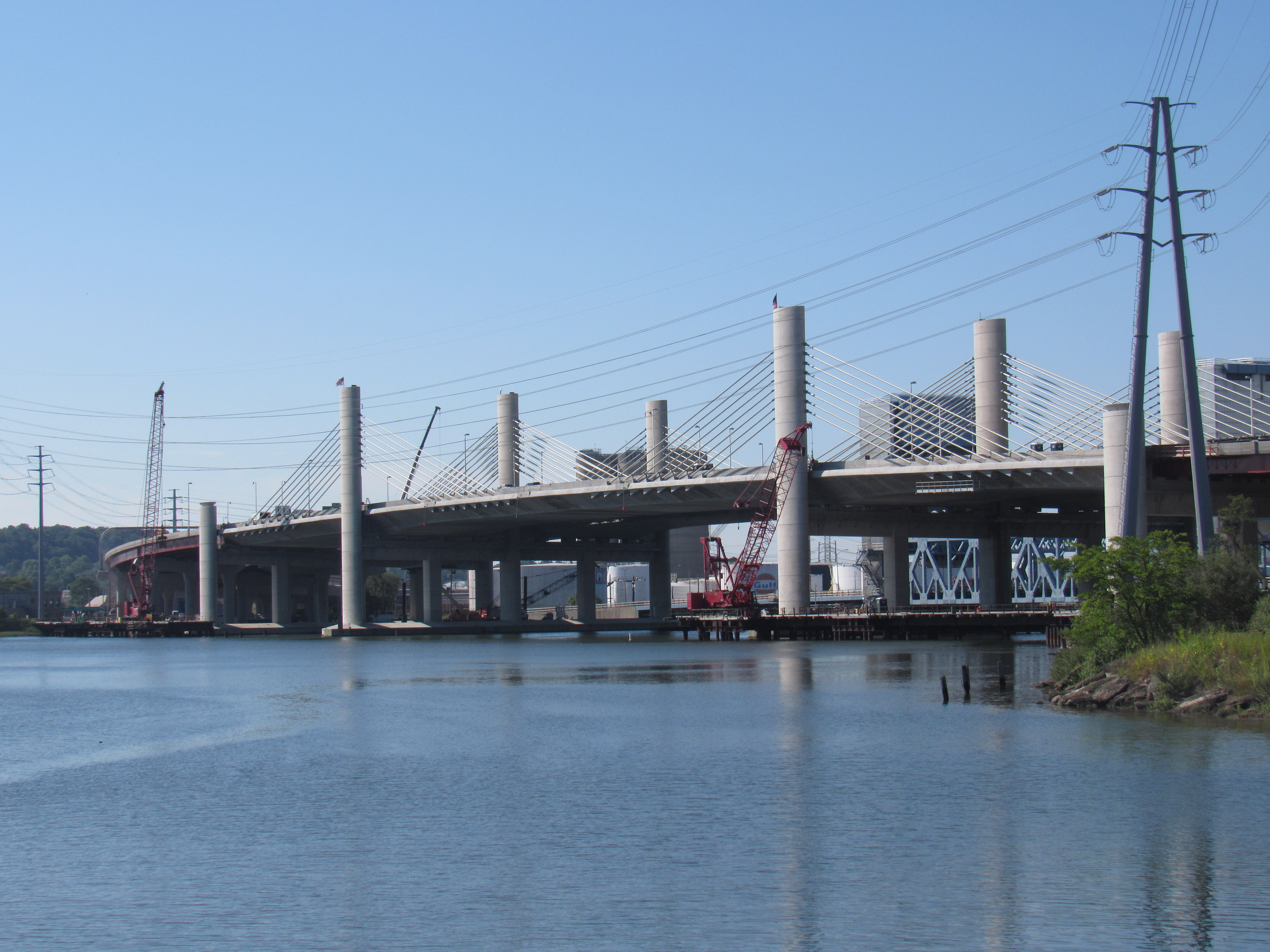
Pearl Harbor Memorial Bridge, New Haven, Connecticut, U.S. Main spans 157 m, 2012-2015

The earliest bridge known to incorporate some of the features of an extradosed design is a bridge in Rzuchów near Leżajsk, constructed in Poland in 1980. Next is the Ganter Bridge, constructed in Switzerland, designed by Christian Menn of Zurich, it preceded by several years the 1988 publication on the design philosophy of such bridges by Jacques Mathivat, who is credited with inventing the extradosed terminology and its design concepts. The Ganter Bridge is a modified prestressed concrete cantilever girder design, where the longitudinal "continuity" tendons are raised significantly above the deck height at the ends of each main span and supported on short towers. These tendons are encased in fin-like blade walls on each side of the towers for protection, a design arrangement now often referred to as a cable-panel bridge.

While little is known of the origin of Menn's design, Mathivat developed a theoretical basis for such a concept during 1982–83 while preparing a tender proposal for the Autoroute A64 viaduct across Arret-Darre in France. Mathivat's design replaced the internal tendons normally located in the top of the box girder with "external" tendons running at a shallow angle from the deck surface in one span up over short towers and back to the next span. These he called extradosed tendons, as they connected to the extrados (or upper surface) of the bridge's spanning structure. The shallow angle of these tendons resulted in them transmitting a large compression force component into the bridge deck structure, allowing them to function in a similar manner to conventional "flexural" bridge prestressing. The extradosed tendons were continuous over the towers and were stressed from the deck level, unlike stay cables, which normally terminate at the top of each pylon.

The first example of a bridge constructed using Mathivat's concepts appears to be the 1993 Ponte dos Socorridos at Camara de Lobos, Portugal, with a main span of 106 m (348 ft). This was quickly followed by the Odawara Blueway Bridge on the Seisho Bypass, Japan, designed by Akio Kasuga and completed in 1994. This bridge has a 122 m (400 ft) main span, a 16.2-m deck width and utilises four 10.7-m tall pylons each supporting two sets of eight exposed extradosed tendons in a modified fan arrangement. These tendons pass over saddles at the top of each pylon, however it is unclear as to whether they form a continuous tendon between the two spans, as the designers' documentation refers to them being anchored outside each saddle to restrain slip. Numerous bridges have subsequently been constructed in Japan to similar designs, the twin, 33 m (108 ft) wide Ibigawa and Kisogawa "Twinkle" bridges, spanning 271.5 m (891 ft) and 275 m (902 ft) across the Ibi and Kiso Rivers respectively, and completed in 2001. Twinkle bridge was the longest extradosed bridge in the world until 2017, when the 1,920 m (6,300 ft) long Arrah-Chhapra Bridge in India became the longest bridge of this type.

In 1996, a short 54 m (177 ft) span bridge of the extradosed style was constructed to pass the A43 Autoroute across the Maurienne River at Saint-Remy-de-Maurienne, France. This was followed in 1998 by the curved, 140 m (460 ft) multi-span Sunniberg Bridge in Switzerland, also designed by Christian Menn and utilising low, outward-leaning pylons to minimise its visual impact on the surroundings.

In North America, a small 104 m (341 ft) fin-backed prestressed concrete bridge was built across Barton Creek near Austin, Texas in 1993 to service a private development. This is similar in concept to the original Ganter Bridge, except that the stay cables are encased within triangular blade walls connecting the deck to the towers. The first "true" extradosed design on the continent is the North Arm Bridge at Vancouver, British Columbia, Canada, which spans 180 m (590 ft) and was completed in 2008.

Since the mid-2000s, the style has grown appreciably in popularity with over fifty bridges with extradosed characteristics being recorded as of 2012. They have been constructed in many countries, although the significant majority of them are located in Japan and South Korea. The longest-span example remains the 2001 Kisogawa Bridge at 275 m (902 ft).

== Design characteristics ==
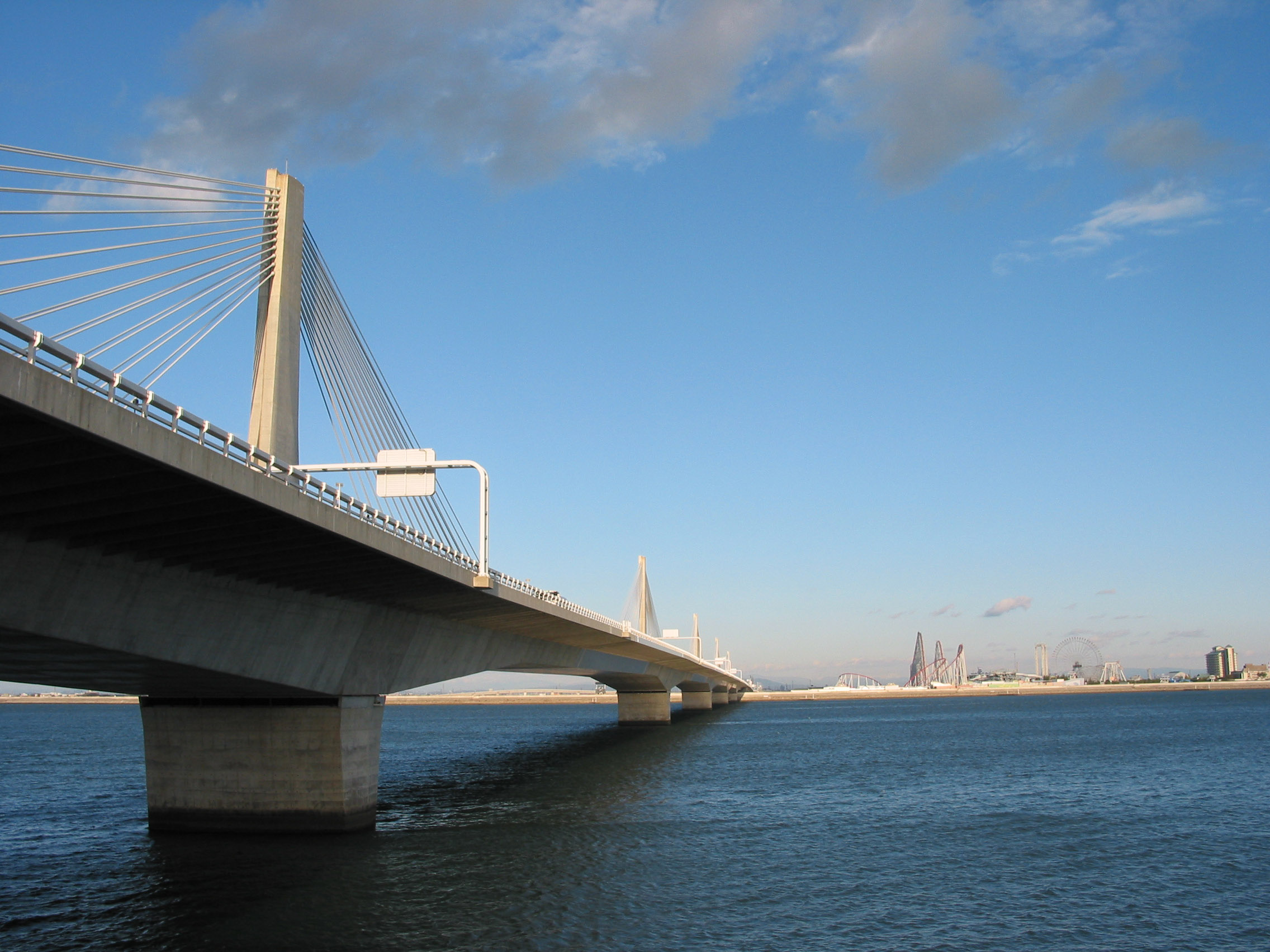
Ibigawa Bridge, Nagoya Japan Main span 271.5 m, 2001

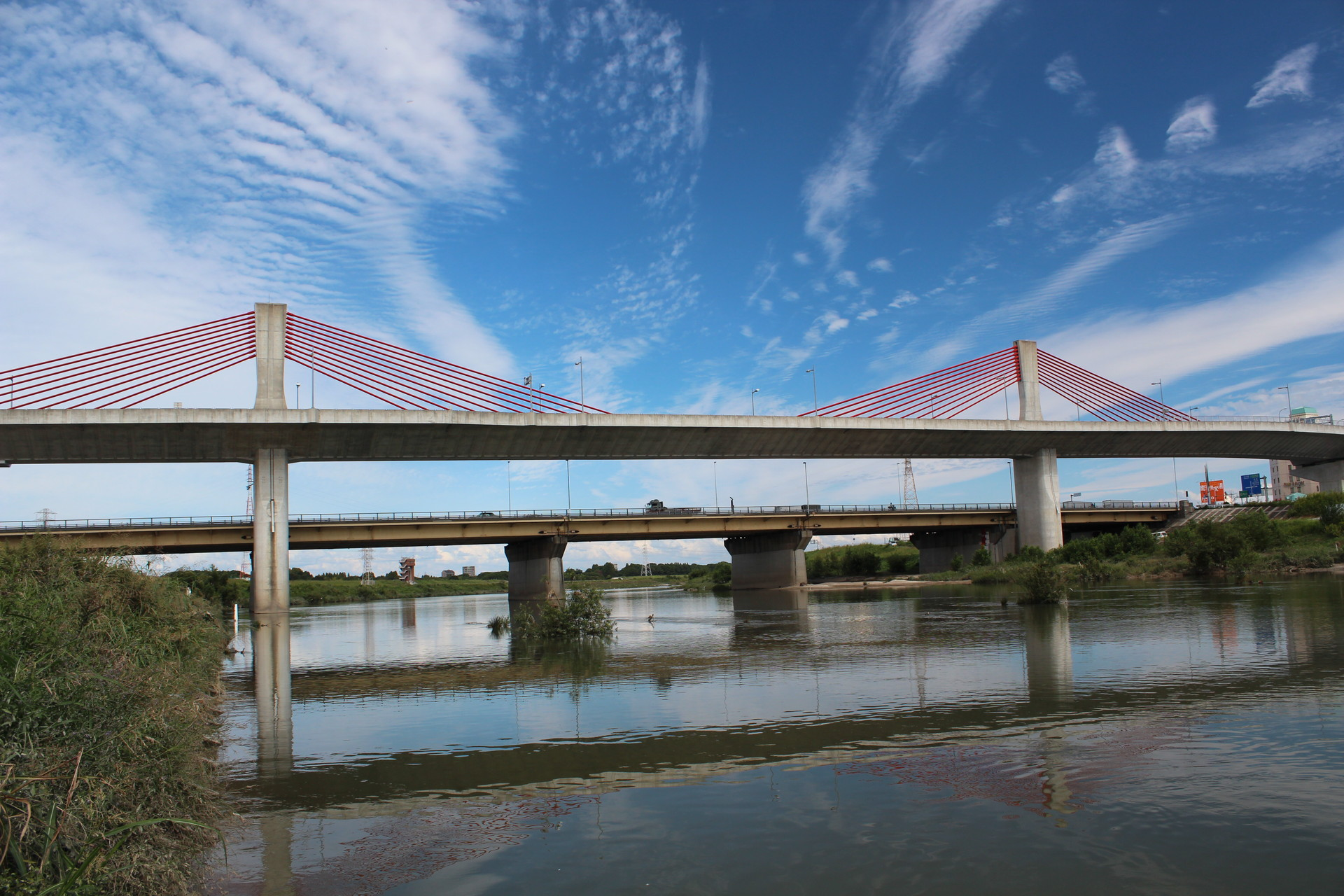
Shinmeisai Bridge, Japan Main span 124 m, 2003

Visually, extradosed bridges typically have the appearance of a cable-stayed bridge with very short towers (pylons), with cable stays of shallow angle that may not extend along the full length of the deck, and (frequently) with a more substantial deck superstructure. Developed as a hybrid structure between the classic cable-stay and cantilever-girder bridge types, they can offer cost saving and aesthetic opportunities for medium-length bridges in the 100 metres (330 ft) to 250 metres (820 ft) span range.

Their hybrid nature can lead to significant additional complexity in their design, as the response of the bridge to applied loads is determined by the interactions between:

- the flexural stiffness of the deck/girder superstructure;
- the axial stiffness of the cable stays;
- the height and longitudinal stiffness of the towers/pylons;
- the lengths of adjacent spans and back-spans;
- the degree of fixity between the superstructure, the towers and the substructure;
- the flexural stiffness of the main support piers.

Although differentiated from cable-stayed bridges in a number of areas, the principal and defining extradosed characteristic is the low height of the main towers or pylons, expressed as a proportion of the main span length. Classic cable-stayed designs employ a tower-height to main-span ratio of around 1:5 (or 0.20). In comparison, extradosed bridges have towers with height:span ratios of between 1:8 and 1:15 (0.125 to 0.067), with around 1:10 (0.10) being most common. This lower tower height results in a much flatter cable angle, typically ~ 17° to the horizontal, and a correspondingly much higher axial compression force within the bridge superstructure due to the greater horizontal force component within each cable stay.

From a structural perspective, the second extradosed characteristic is the reduced proportion of superstructure live load that is carried by the cables. On cable-stayed bridges, the stays commonly support at least 80% of the loading from vehicular traffic acting on the bridge superstructure, whereas on extradosed bridges, the stay cables typically support only between 20% and 60% of this load. In both cases, the remainder of the load is carried by the longitudinal girder element in spanning-action between the main bridge supports. This characteristic derives from the relative stiffnesses between the cable stays and the girder element. Cable-stay designs typically incorporate flexible deck structures without a stiff girder element, and such systems transfer the majority of any applied deck loads directly into the nearest stay cables. In comparison, extradosed designs utilise a substantially stiffer deck/girder structure, allowing the girder to support a significant proportion of any deck loads, and facilitating the distribution of the remaining load between a larger number of individual stay elements.

Thirdly is the magnitude of fatigue loading experienced by the external cables, and their subsequent treatment by design codes. Unlike a bridge's near-constant dead load, its live load can be highly variable both in time and position, resulting in fluctuations in the stress level experienced by the bridge's structural elements as the live loading varies. The lower proportion of live load carried by the extradosed cables results in a reduced magnitude of stress fluctuations within the cables, down from typically 100 megapascals (15,000 psi) or above for cable-stay bridges to around 50 megapascals (7,300 psi) for extradosed designs. This has a direct benefit in reducing the detrimental effects of fatigue experienced by the stay cables and their end anchorages, and bridge design codes allow extradosed stay cables to operate at a significantly higher design stress level and therefore material efficiency level as a result.

As a result of these characteristics, the "stay cables" on extradosed bridges are not treated as such by the design codes, but are instead considered as external post-tensioning tendons that have been deviated upwards from the deck to the towers to increase the superstructure's load capacity over the main supports. Extradosed bridges frequently extend this approach by making the extradosed tendons continuous over the towers via saddle supports and using anchorages only at the deck connections, significantly simplifying the tensioning operations.

== By country ==
=== Australia ===
The Fremantle Traffic Bridge is set to become Australia′s first extradosed bridge, located in Fremantle, Western Australia. Delivered as part of the Swan River Crossings project, this $400M+ project replaces an aging 1939 timber structure with a safer, more durable, 100-year-lifespan bridge that will improve marine, pedestrian, and traffic access. Much of the construction has occurred with the original bridge in service. The original bridge was closed to traffic in February 2026 to allow for its demolition, followed by the installation of deck girders and traffic surfaces. Completion of the bridge and reopening to the public is expected on 1 November 2026.

=== Bolivia ===
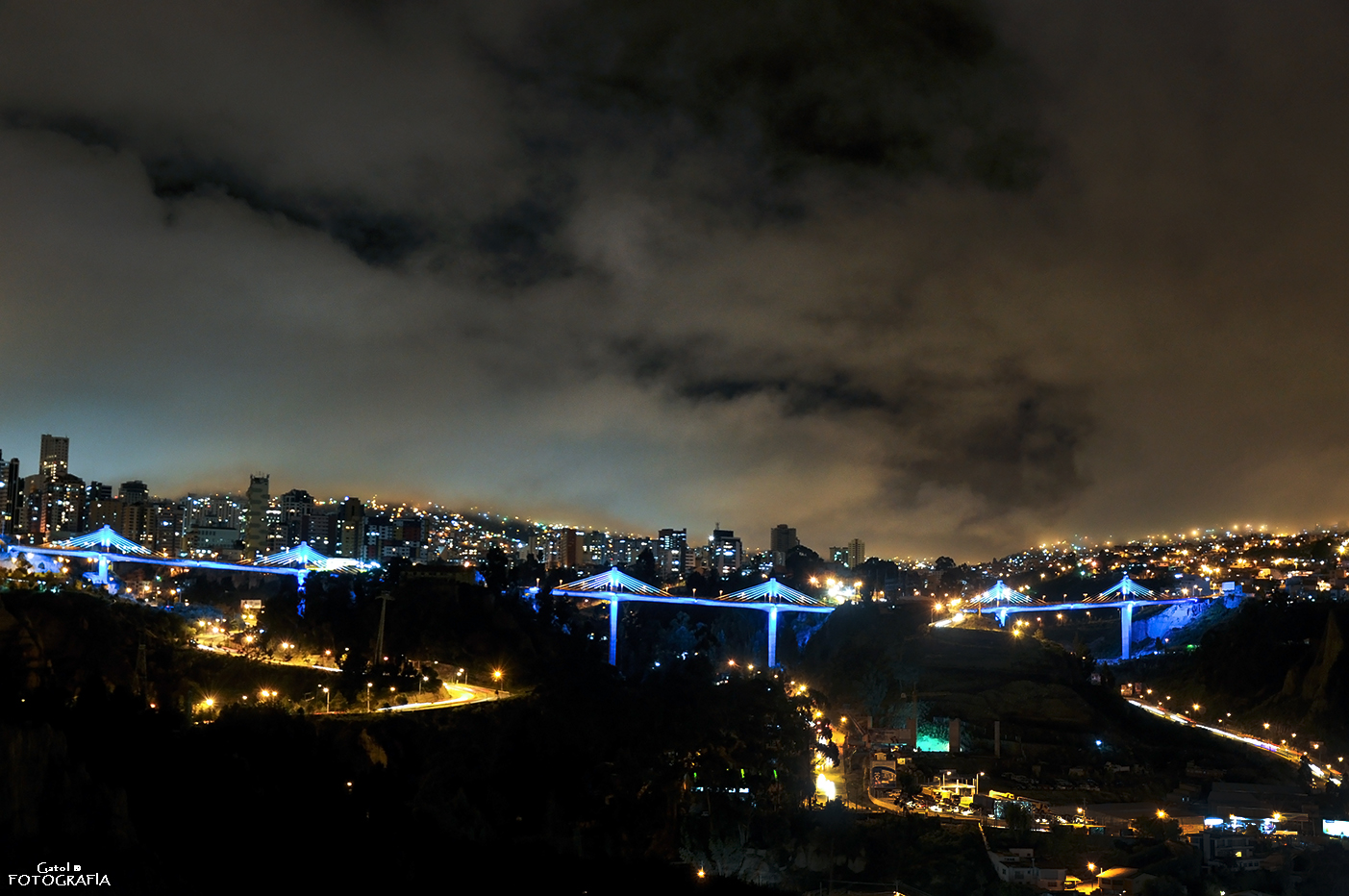
Puentes Trillizos: The Triplets bridges

The Triplets are the first three extradosed concrete bridges in Bolivia. The construction of a beltway allowing traffic decongestion in the city of La Paz was completed in 2010. The new elevated road crosses three parallel valleys with signature bridges. These three consecutive bridges have similar features and as a result are called the Triplets. All three-span structures are made of concrete, with maximum span of 113 metres, featuring extradosed pre-stressed concrete. The structures are built using balanced cantilever segmental construction. The elevation of the bridges reaches heights between 40 and 60 m above the bottom of the valley, which made a cable-stayed bridge option, with pylons higher than 25 m above the deck, inappropriate for the site. Therefore, it was proposed an extradosed bridge type, which reduces the height of the pylon, and a single plane of stays to allow a more transparent view. The bridges were designed by PEDELTA.

=== Canada ===
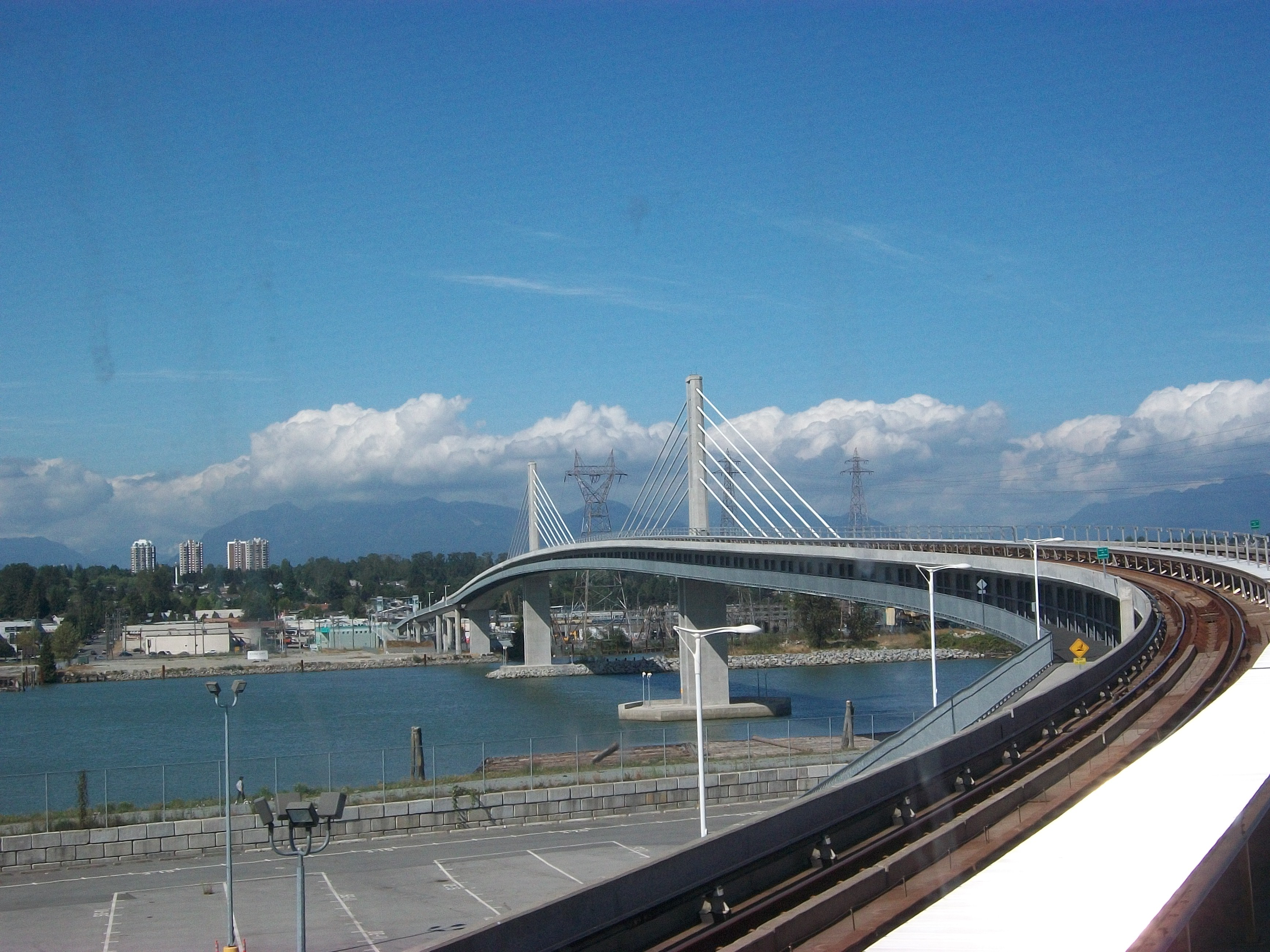
North Arm Bridge, Canada 2009

The North Arm Bridge is a transit-pedestrian bridge of SkyTrain Canada Line, connecting Vancouver with its suburb of Richmond crossing over the Fraser River. The bridge went into service on 17 August 2009, coinciding with the opening of the Canada Line.

The Golden Ears Bridge, crosses the Fraser River between the municipalities of Pitt Meadows / Maple Ridge and Langley. It is the longest extradosed bridge in North America. The bridge opened to traffic on 16 June 2009.

=== China ===
Extradosed bridges are rare in China, while the first was Wuhu Yangtze River Bridge completed in 2000, although the bridge is described as cable-stayed by some sources. One main span is 312 m (1,024 ft) long. Several bridges followed, including the recently opened Hongxi Bridge with 265 m (869 ft) long main span.

=== India ===
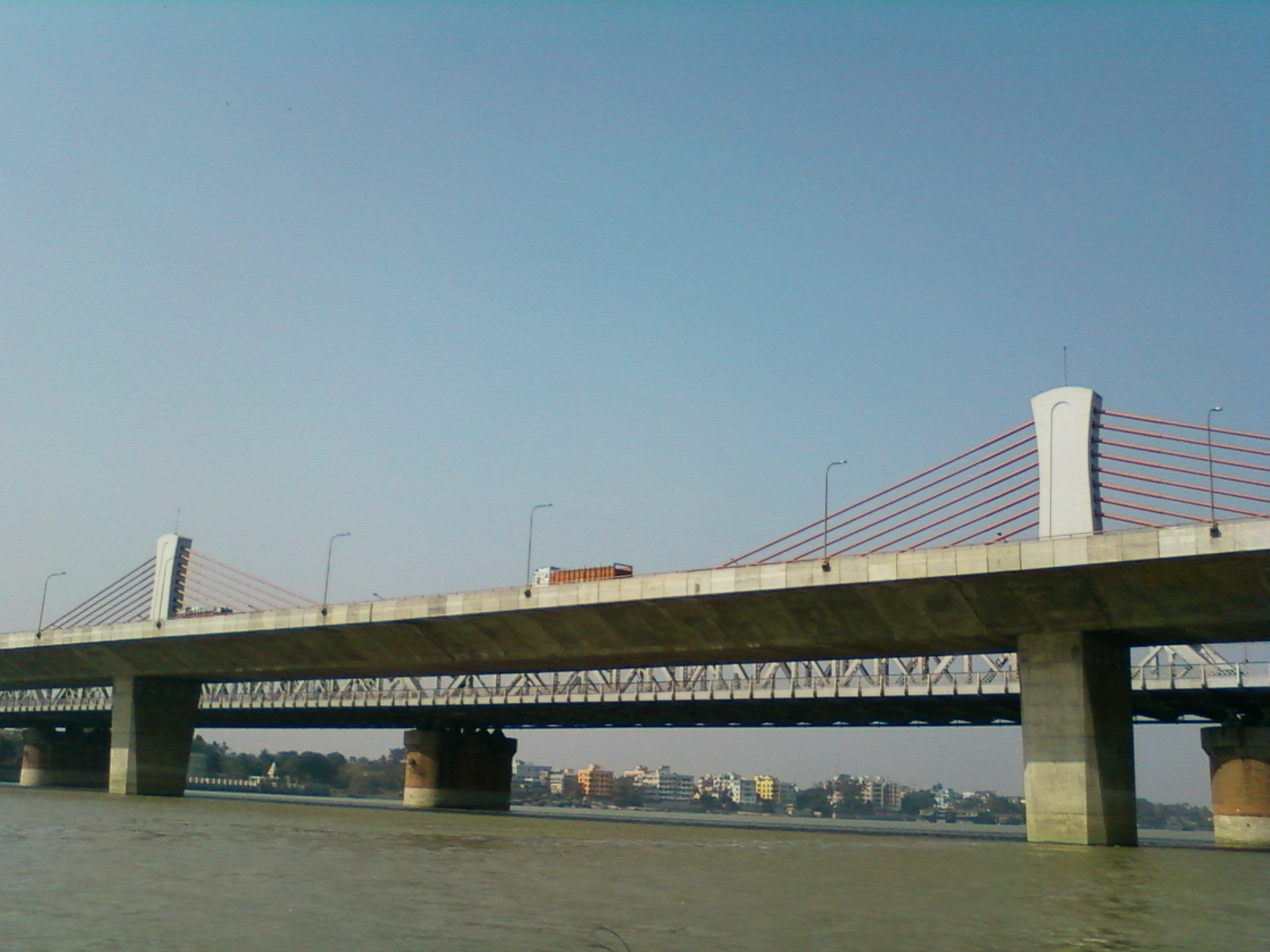
Nivedita Setu. Main bridge 880 m (2,890 ft)

In 2006, Delhi Metro's Blue Line was extended to Indraprastha from Barakhamba Road. This section had a Extradosed Bridge between Supreme Court and Indraprastha Station.

India's first extradosed bridge for road traffic, Nivedita Setu, was completed in 2007 by Larsen & Toubro Ltd. for the Second Vivekananda Bridge Toll corporation over river Hooghly, Kolkata. This bridge is 880 m (2,890 ft) long, with a span of 110 m (360 ft).

The 3rd Narmada Bridge, which bears a similarity to the Golden Ears Bridge in Vancouver, Canada, was completed March 2017 across Narmada River in Bharuch, Gujarat. It is the first extradosed bridge to be built in state of Gujarat and its span of 144 m (472 ft) is the longest in India.

A few months later in June 2017, the Arrah–Chhapra Bridge opened across the Ganges river connecting Arrah and Chhapra in Bhojpur and Saran districts in the state of Bihar. It is the longest multi-span extradosed bridge in the world, with a main bridge length of 1,920 m (6,300 ft).

=== Ireland ===
Ireland's first extradosed bridge, the Rose Fitzgerald Kennedy Bridge, was built by BAM and Dragados, and opened for traffic in January 2020. It is 894 m long, with an average width of 21.9 m. The bridge spans the River Barrow south of New Ross and is part of the N25 national primary route. The 230 metres (750 ft) main spans of the bridge were, in 2020, the longest concrete-only extradosed box-girder bridge spans in the world. The spans are equal in length to the main span of the N25 Suir Bridge in Waterford; and four metres shorter the main span of the Foyle Bridge in Northern Ireland, which is 21 metres shorter in total length. The two central main spans are supported by a central plane of stay cables passing through saddles located on three towers at the three central supports. The distinctive feature of the Bridge is the different height of the towers. The side towers have a height of 16.2m and have 8 passing cables, and the central pier has a height of 27.0m and 18 passing cables.

=== Latvia ===
The Southern Bridge over the Daugava River in Riga, Latvia, is as of 2010 the biggest construction project in Latvia and its capital city, Riga. In work volume it can only be compared to the Island Bridge that was built in the 1970s. Work on the development of the Southern Bridge project started in 2002, when the City Development Department of the Riga City Council developed the design task for the route of the bridge, which would connect Vienības Anenue on the left bank of the Daugava River and the Slāvu Roundabout on the right bank. The Southern Bridge over represents a multispan extradosed structure of 49.5 + 77 + 5 × 110 + 77 + 49.5 metres with six traffic lanes. The total length of the bridge is 803 metres. The width is 34.28 metres. There are six pylons, each at a height 13.33 metres above the roadway pavement. Each pylon has eight pairs of cables.

=== Norway ===
The first extradosed bridge in Scandinavia is the Harpe Bridge crossing the Norwegian river Gudbrandsdalslågen as part of the highway E6. The bridge was opened for traffic 17 December 2016. It is 324 meters long and carries four lanes of traffic.

=== Pakistan ===
Pakistan inaugurated its first extradosed bridge for traffic on 21 August 2014. The Earthquake Memorial Bridge was built in four years on the Jhelum River in Muzaffarabad, the capital of Azad Jammu Kashmir region of Pakistan. The bridge is 60 metres above the river and 246 metre long. The cable-stayed extradosed bridge was designed and funded by the Japan International Cooperation Agency at the cost of approximately Rs 1.5 billion. The bridge connects Naluchi and Chattar areas of Muzaffarabad reduced commuting duration by an hour.

=== Poland ===
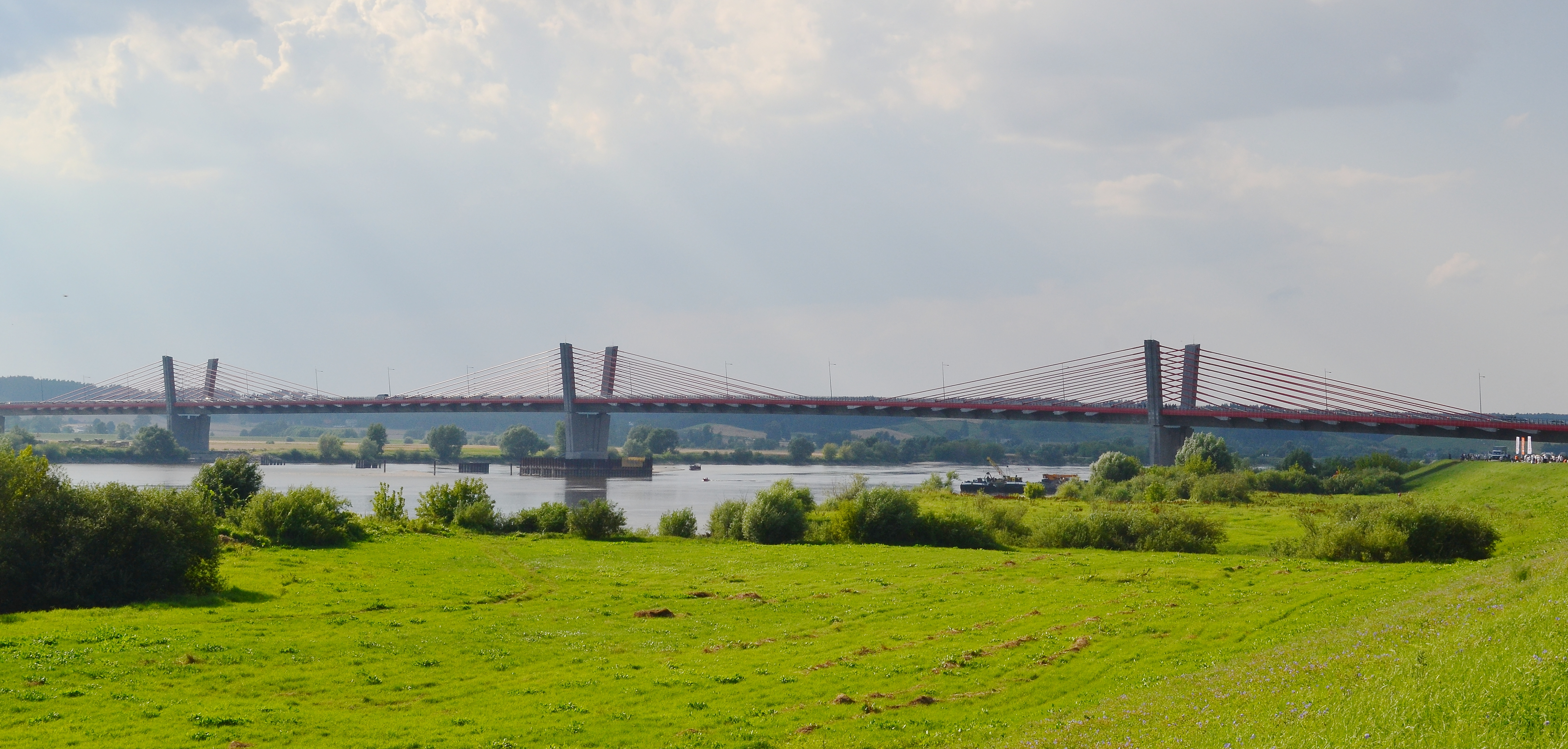
808-meter bridge near Kwidzyn crossing Vistula

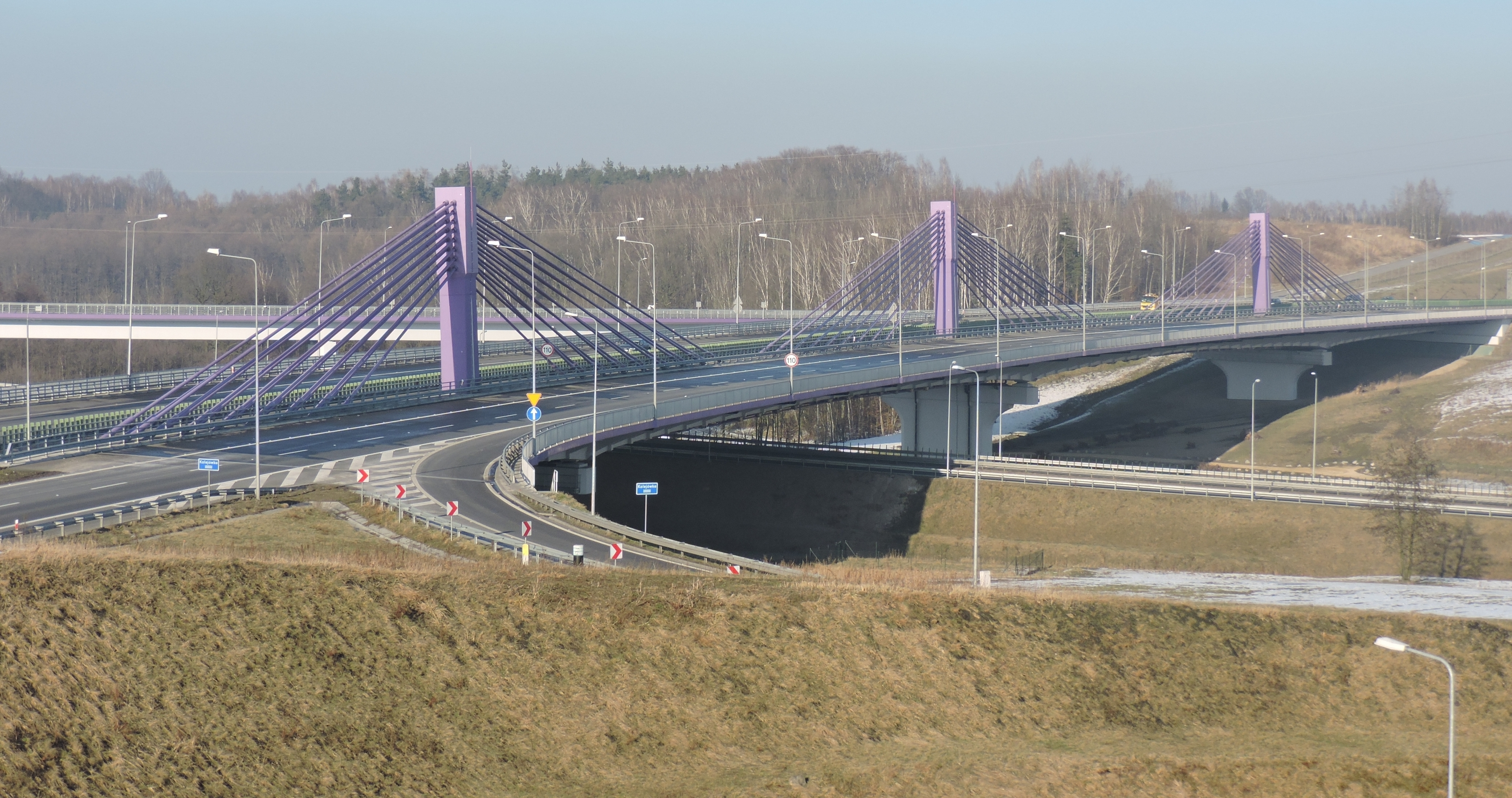
402-meter bridge in Mszana near Wodzisław Śląski is the widest extradosed bridge in the world.

The largest extradosed bridge in Europe, one of the largest in the Europe, is the Kwidzyn Bridge opened to traffic on 26 July 2013 over the Vistula River from Opalenie to Kwidzyn. The total length of the bridge is 808.5 metres (2,653 ft) with the main span of 204 m. The bridge has been commissioned by General Directorate for National Roads and Highways, designed by Transprojekt Gdanski and is built by Budimex and Ferrovial Agroman at a cost of 90 million EUR.

The widest extradosed bridge in the world is Most autostradowy w Mszanie (MA 532) on A1 autostrada (Poland).

=== Sri Lanka ===
Sri Lanka's Road Development Authority constructed the New Kelani river bridge, an extradosed bridge over the Kelani River, as part of a project aimed at improving traffic condition around the existing New Kelani Bridge. The total length of the bridge is 380m with a 180m main span and two 100m side spans. The project was completed in November 2021.

=== Tanzania ===
Tanzanite Bridge is the first extradosed bridge in United Republic of Tanzania. The 6.23-kilometre bridge will attempt to relieve the traffic bottleneck by connecting the area near Coco Beach and Agakan Hospital in Dar es Salaam with a four-lane bridge (1 km) on the sea. Construction is scheduled to start in the latter half of the year for completion in 2021. From the total length of 6.23 km, the length of the new bridge is 1.03 km. The main bridge itself is 670m long and is designed as an extradosed bridge with a maximum span of 125m. The road consists of a 4.52 km section where two lanes has been expanded to four lanes and a new 0.68 km section.

=== Thailand ===
Maha Chesadabodindranusorn Bridge is the first extradosed bridge in Thailand. The 4.3-kilometer Maha Chesadabodindranusorn Bridge links the western side (Bang Krang and Bang Sri Muang subdistricts) with the eastern part of the Nonthaburi province (Suan Yai and Talat Kwan subdistricts) and a new road connecting with Ratchaphruek Road.

=== Turkey ===
Çallı Bridge, in Antalya city center, is the first extradosed bridge designed and constructed in Turkey. The 180 m (590 ft) long bridge has an 80 m (260 ft) main span with 50 m (160 ft) side spans sustained by 2 x 4 sets of 4 extradosed cables (harp design) supported above the 30 m (98 ft) wide deck by two 7 m (23 ft) pylons canted away from the main span. The 6-lane bridge was opened to traffic for Expo 2016.

=== United States ===
The first extradosed bridge in the U.S. is the northbound span of the Pearl Harbor Memorial Bridge that carries Interstate 95 (Connecticut Turnpike) over the Quinnipiac River in New Haven, Connecticut, which opened to traffic on 22 June 2012. The southbound span opened on 19 August 2015, making it the fourth extradosed bridge in the U.S.

The second and third extradosed bridges in the U.S. are Interstate 35 frontage road spans over the Brazos River in Waco, Texas. Construction began in July 2012 and the bridges were dedicated in July 2014. They are the first extradosed bridges to be constructed in Texas.

The fifth extradosed bridge in the United States is the St. Croix Crossing, which crosses the St. Croix River between Oak Park Heights, Minnesota and St. Joseph, Wisconsin. Construction began on the bridge in 2014 and it was opened to traffic on 2 August 2017. The bridge replaced the older Stillwater Bridge in downtown Stillwater, Minnesota, which was functionally obsolete and deteriorating from its age.
