= Golden Bridge (India) =

Golden Bridge Narmada Bridge
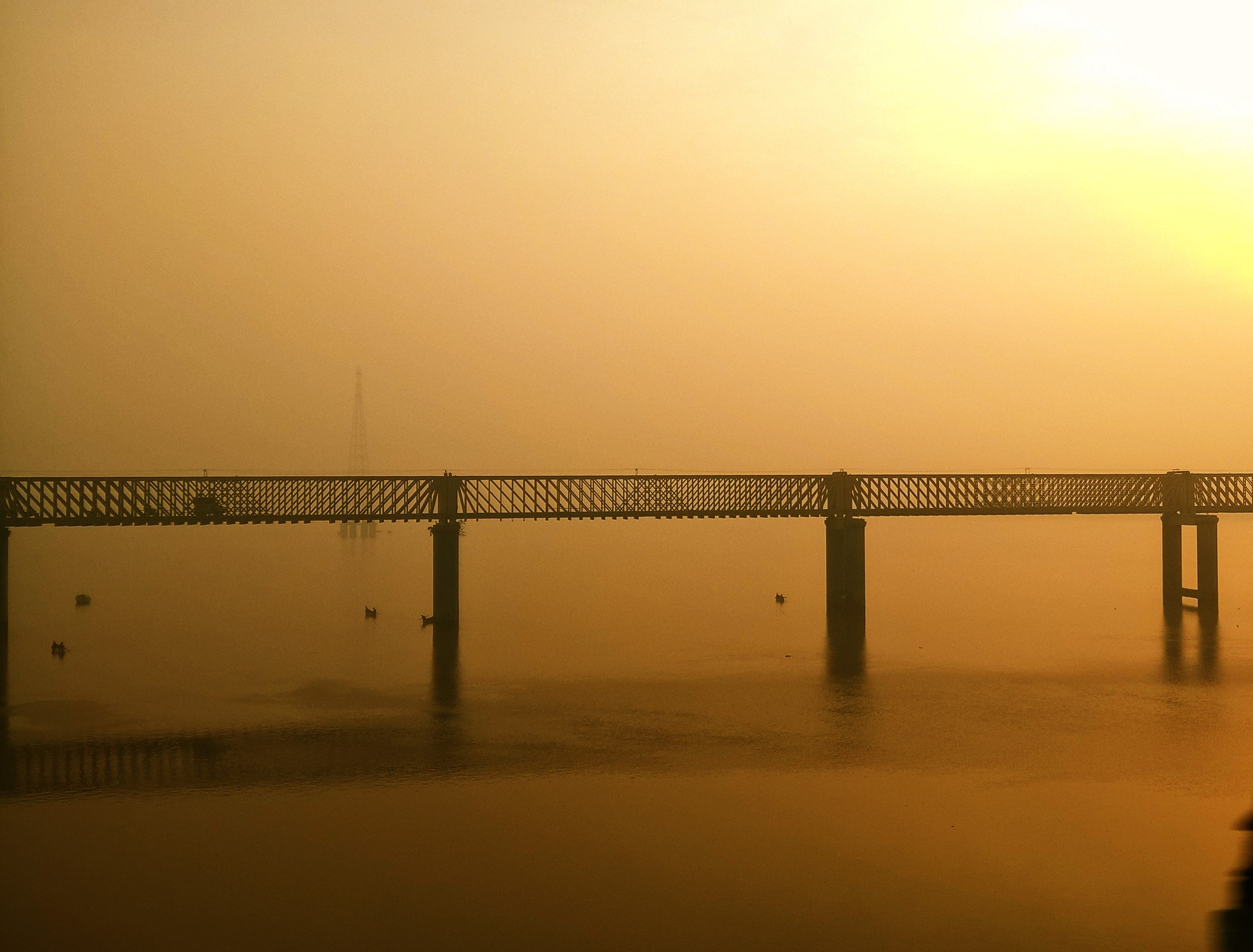
- Golden Bridge viewed from railway bridge
- Coordinates: 21°41′36″N 73°00′18″E
- Carries: Road
- Crosses: Narmada River
- Locale: Bharuch and Ankleshwar in India

Characteristics
- Design: Through arch bridge
- Total length: 1,412 m (4,633 ft)

History
- Construction start: 7 December 1877
- Construction end: 16 May 1881

Location
- Interactive map of Golden Bridge

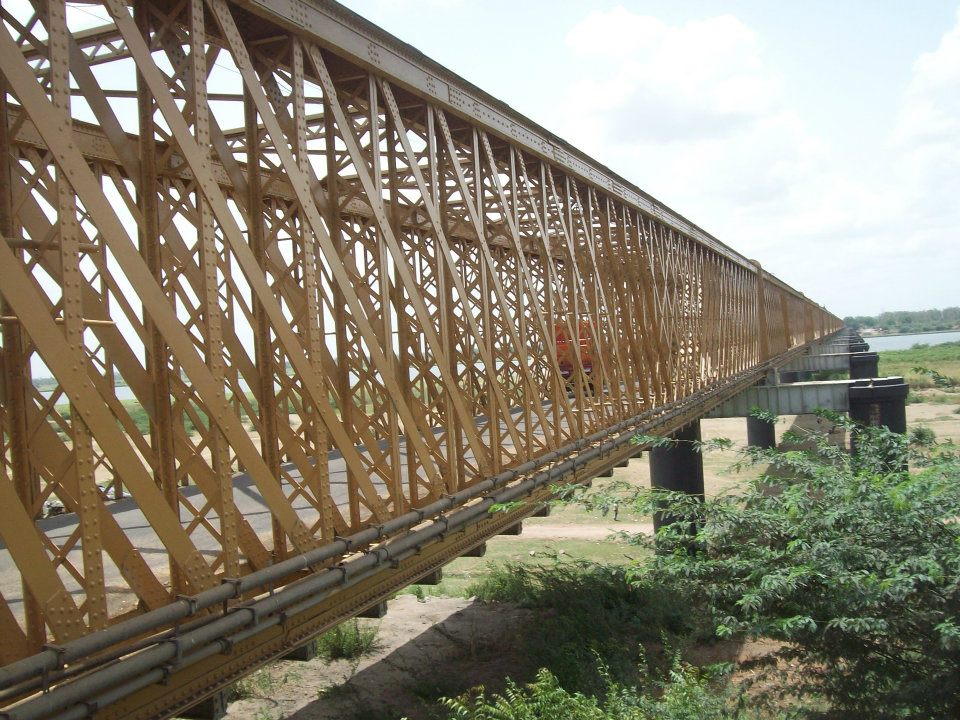
Golden bridge on Narmada river

The Golden Bridge connects Ankleshwar to Bharuch in the Gujarat state of western India. It was built in 1881 by the British, who needed a bridge across the Narmada River to create better access to trade and administration officials in Bombay (now called Mumbai). The bridge is also called the Narmada Bridge.

== Construction ==
The British started construction on the iron bridge on 7 December 1877. The bridge was contracted by the Bombay, Baroda, and Central India Railway and was designed by Sir John Hawkshaw. The bridge was completed on 16 May 1881 at a cost of Rs 45.65 lakhs. Originally named the Narmada Bridge, it came to be known as the Golden Bridge on account of the heavy expenditure incurred during construction due to damage from heavy water flow. After independence, it became part of the national highway. However, the flow of heavy traffic was reduced after a new bridge on Narmada was built. The length of the Golden Bridge is 1,412 metres (4,633 ft).

=== Impact of 2023 Bharuch Flood ===
In September 2023, the Golden Bridge experienced significant challenges due to severe flooding in Bharuch. The flood was caused by continuous heavy rainfall and the release of water from the Sardar Sarovar Dam on the Narmada River. The water level of the Narmada River near the Golden Bridge reached about 9 feet above the danger mark, leading to the evacuation of over 2,000 people and around 500 cattle to relief camps. The bridge was temporarily closed to traffic due to waterlogging and safety concerns. The State Disaster Response Force (SDRF) and the National Disaster Response Force (NDRF) were deployed in the area for rescue operations.

== Operation and Significance ==
For nearly a century, Golden Bridge was the only road crossing of the Narmada between Bharuch and Ankleshwar, carrying buses, trucks and pedestrian traffic bound for Bombay and central India. Its narrow width, just two vehicle lanes became famous for nightly pilgrim processions during river side festivals, and its vantage point remains a popular sunset lookout. Structural inspections in the 1970s and 2000s affirmed its resilience: despite exposure to floods, monsoon currents and occasional tremors, the iron superstructure exhibited only minor corrosion and deformation thanks to regular maintenance by Western Railway and later state PWD teams.

== See also ==
- Silver Jubilee Railway Bridge Bharuch
- 3rd Narmada Bridge
