= 3rd Narmada Bridge =

Bridge in Bharuch, India

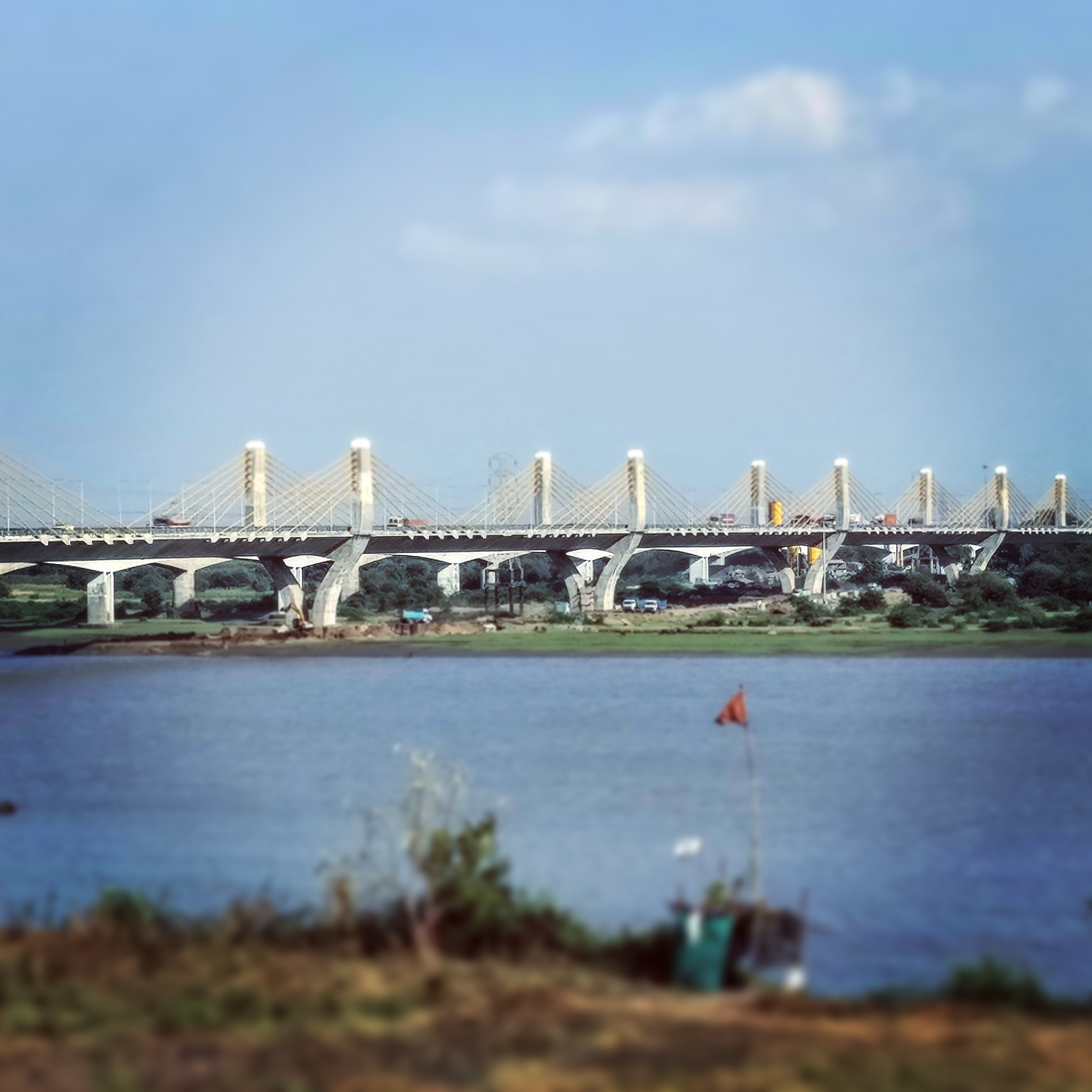
- Extradosed bridge with the longest spans in India
- Coordinates: 21.7149°N 73.0458°E
- Carries: four lanes of NH-8 traffic
- Crosses: Narmada River
- Locale: Bharuch
- Official name: New Narmada Bridge
- Named for: Narmada River
- Maintained by: NHAI

Characteristics
- Design: Extradosed bridge
- Material: Steel, Cement, Cables, Alloy
- Total length: 1,344 m (4,409 ft)
- Width: 22.8 m (75 ft)
- Longest span: 144 m (472 ft)
- No. of spans: 10

History
- Constructed by: Larsen & Toubro
- Construction start: 2014
- Construction end: 2017
- Construction cost: ₹379 crore (equivalent to ₹532 crore or US$63 million in 2023)
- Opened: 7 March 2017

Location
- Interactive map of 3rd Narmada Bridge

The New Narmada Bridge (or the 3rd Narmada Bridge) is an extra dosed bridge, constructed at Bharuch, India. It is a 1,344 m (4,409 ft) long bridge, built over river Narmada on NH-8. The four-lane bridge is a part of larger project involving six laning of a section of NH-8 between Vadodara and Surat. It runs parallel to Sardar Bridge. It is the extradosed bridge with the longest spans in India, 144 m (472 ft) long. The bridge was constructed by Larsen & Toubro and Dywidag Systems International (DSI-Bridgecon). The estimated cost of bridge is ₹379 crore (equivalent to ₹532 crore or US$63 million in 2023). This bridge was inaugurated by Indian Prime Minister Narendra Modi on 7 March 2017.

A few months later in June 2017, the Arrah–Chhapra Bridge opened and became the longest multi-span extradosed bridge in the world, with a main bridge length of 1,920 m (6,300 ft). Even so, the 3rd Narmada Bridge remains the extradosed bridge with the longest spans in India.

== History and Construction ==
Bharuch bridge was proposed in 2011 by Bharuch Citizen Council to connect two flyovers at Jadeswar Chowkdy and the Mandva Flyover on National highway 8. It was sanctioned at a cost of ₹503.16 crore (equivalent to ₹855 crore or US$100 million in 2023) in 28 December 2013, by the Cabinet Committee on Economic Affairs, chaired by then Prime Minister Manmohan Singh. Later, on 25 February 2014, the contract was awarded to Larsen & Toubro (L&T) from Hindustan Construction Company (HCC) at a significantly lower bid of ₹379 crore (equivalent to ₹644 crore or US$76 million in 2023) and was redesigned as an extra-dosed cable-stayed bridge. Construction of the bridge over the Narmada River commenced on March 3, 2014. The project involved placing heavy 132-ton segments using boats and was affected by fluctuating water levels in the Narmada, which caused minor delays during high-precision stages of the construction. Construction was completed in September 2016, a slight delay from the original target of August 2016. It was inaugurated by Prime Minister Narendra Modi in March 2017.

== Design and Features ==
It is the third bridge over the Narmada River at Bharuch, built parallel to the Sardar Bridge and the 1881 Golden Bridge. It was designed similarly to the Golden Ears Bridge in Canada. It is India’s fourth extra-dosed bridge with 216 cables ranging from 25 to 40 meters in length and carries a four-lane road 17.4 m (57 ft) wide with 3 m (9.8 ft) wide footpaths. It consists of ten spans (eight of 144 m (472 ft) and two of 96 m (315 ft)) supported by 132-ton segments placed using specialized equipment. It is illuminated by over 400 LED lights along its length. The highest point of the bridge rises 120 ft (37 m) above the riverbed.

== Purpose and Significance ==
The Third Narmada Bridge was constructed to address severe and recurring traffic congestion on the Ahmedabad - Mumbai section of National Highway 8 (now NH-48) near Bharuch, one of the busiest highways in India. The older Sardar Bridge and the historic Golden Bridge frequently became bottlenecks, especially during maintenance or peak industrial traffic hours, resulting in jams extending up to 40 km (25 mi) and stranding thousands of vehicles for days. The new bridge was built as part of a six-laning project between Km 192 and Km 198 on the Vadodara – Surat stretch, under the National Highways Development Programme (NHDP). The bridge plays a key role in supporting industrial traffic between ports like Dahej and Hazira and hubs along the Golden Corridor, enhancing logistics efficiency and economic movement in the region.

== See also ==
- Golden Bridge, completed in 1881
- Silver Jubilee Railway Bridge Bharuch, completed in 1935
