= Kansai Nerolac Paints =

Paint company in India

Kansai Nerolac Paints Limited
- Type: Public
- Traded as: BSE: 500165; NSE: KANSAINER
- Industry: Chemicals
- Founded: 1920
- Headquarters: Mumbai, Maharashtra, India
- Area served: India
- Key people: Mr. Pravin Chaudhari Managing Director & CEO
- Products: Chemicals; Decorative paints; Industrial finishing products; Coatings
- Revenue: ▲₹7,893 crore (US$820 million) (2024)
- Operating income: ▲₹1,561 crore (US$160 million) (2024)
- Net income: ▲₹1,176 crore (US$120 million) (2024)
- Total assets: ▲₹7,410 crore (US$770 million) (2024)
- Total equity: ▲₹5,599 crore (US$580 million) (2024)
- Number of employees: 2,992 (2020)
- Parent: Kansai Paint
- Website: nerolac.com

Kansai Nerolac Paints Limited (formerly known as Goodlass Nerolac Paints Ltd) is the largest industrial paint and third largest decorative paint company of India based in Mumbai. It is a subsidiary of Kansai Paint of Japan. As of 2015, it has the third largest market share with 15.4% in the Indian paint industry. It is engaged in the industrial, automotive and powder coating business. It develops and supplies paint systems used on the finishing lines of electrical components, cycle, material handling equipment, bus bodies, containers and furniture industries.

== History ==
- 1920 : It started as Gahagan Paints & Varnish Co. Ltd. at Lower Parel in Mumbai.
- 1957 : Goodlass Wall Pvt. Ltd. grew popular as Goodlass Nerolac Paints (Pvt.) Ltd. Also, it went public in the same year and established itself as Goodlass Nerolac Paints Ltd. .
- 1976 : Goodlass Nerolac Paints Ltd. became a part of Tata Forbes Group on acquisition of a part of the foreign shareholdings by Forbes Gokak. .
- 1983 : Goodlass Nerolac Paints Ltd. strengthened itself by entering in technical collaboration agreement by Kansai Paint Co. Ltd., Japan and Nihon Tokushu Tokyo Co. Ltd., Japan.
- 1999 : Kansai Paint Co. Ltd., Japan took over the entire stake of Tata Forbes group and thus Goodlass Nerolac Paints became wholly owned subsidiary of Kansai Paint Company Ltd.
- 2006 : On 11 July, Goodlass Paint Ltd. name has been changed to Kansai Nerolac Paints Ltd.

== Company overview ==
Kansai Nerolac Paints has 6 paint manufacturing plants and about 6–7 contract manufacturers. The Nerolac owned plants are at 1. Jainpur, Kanpur Dehat (Uttar Pradesh) 2. Bawal (Haryana) 3. Lote, Chiplun (Maharashtra) 4. Hosur (Tamil Nadu) 5. Sayakha (Gujarat) 6. Goindwal (Punjab) 7. Visakhapatnam (Andhra Pradesh) (Upcoming)

Kansai Nerolac Paints Ltd. has entered into many technical collaborations with other industry leaders such as E.I. Du-products.

The Mumbai-based company is the leader in the industrial paints segment with a market share of over 40%. It is the third-largest player in the decorative paints segment with a modest market share of 13%. Nearly 75% of the Indian paints industry consists of the decorative segment.

== Parent company ==
Kansai Paint was founded by Katsujiro Iwai in Amagasaki City, Japan in May 1918. Kansai Paint is a comprehensive manufacturer of paints and coatings. The Products include- Automotive Coatings, Industrial coatings, Decorative coatings, Protective coatings and Marine Coatings. They are also present in U.K., Turkey, U.S., Canada, Mexico, UAE.

== Products and services ==
Technologically innovative products are the company's hallmark. Kansai Nerolac Paint offers differentiated products with a focus on being eco-friendly and healthy. Kansai Nerolac Paint's key products and brands include the following:

- Decorative Paints: Interior wall paints, exterior wall paints, Wood surface paints, and Metals surface paints.
- Automotive Coatings :Pre-Treatment Chemicals, Electrodeposition. Intermediate Coats/Primer Surfacers, Topcoats, Clear Coats, Touch Up Paints, Auto Refinishing Products, Heat Resistant Paints, Underbody Paints & PVC Sealants & Rapgard Transit Protection Films.
- Performance Coatings: Performance Coating is available for a wide range of products. For household appliances and metal fittings in factories, there is a comprehensive range of general industrial coating systems like P.T. chemicals, Primers and lacquers, Coil Coat, Heat Resistant Paints & Metal Decoration Coatings. Powder Coating is now increasing in popularity because of its high quality, resistance to corrosion, the apparent ease of application and the environmental friendliness of the technology.

== Marketing and advertising ==
Kansai Nerolac has run advertising campaigns, including television commercials, with Bollywood actors including, Shah Rukh Khan & Ranveer Singh and radio station Red FM.

== Awards and achievements ==
- Golden Peacock Environment Management Award, 2005.
- Short listed for the Best Managed Company Award from Business Today & A.T. Kearney 2005.
- Best Vendor Award from customers like Toyota Kirloskar Motors Ltd. (TKML) for Cost and from Maruti Udyog Ltd.(MUL) on overall commendation.
- Awards for Marketing Initiatives like Cannes 2007 Bronze for Press Ad.
- Reader's Digest Trusted Brands Gold Awards, 2008.
- Product of the Year Award 2010 for Nerolac Excel April 2010.
- Product of the Year Award 2011 for Nerolac Excel Total with Heat-Guard Technology April 2011.
- Sustainability Award for outstanding contribution by Mahindra & Mahindra – October 2011.
- Best Vendor Performance Award in Paint Supplier's Category by Honda Motors cycles & scooters at their annual conference 2012.
- ASAPP Media Information Group – Construction World Magazine Ranked Kansai Nerolac Paints First.
