= Adadara =

Village in Gujarat, India

Coordinates: 21°30′53″N 72°54′22″E

Adadara is a village in Ankleshwar division, Bharuch district, Gujarat, India. As of the 2011 census, it had a population of 478 people in 96 families.
