= Southern Bridge =

Bridge in Riga, Latvia

Southern Bridge Dienvidu tilts
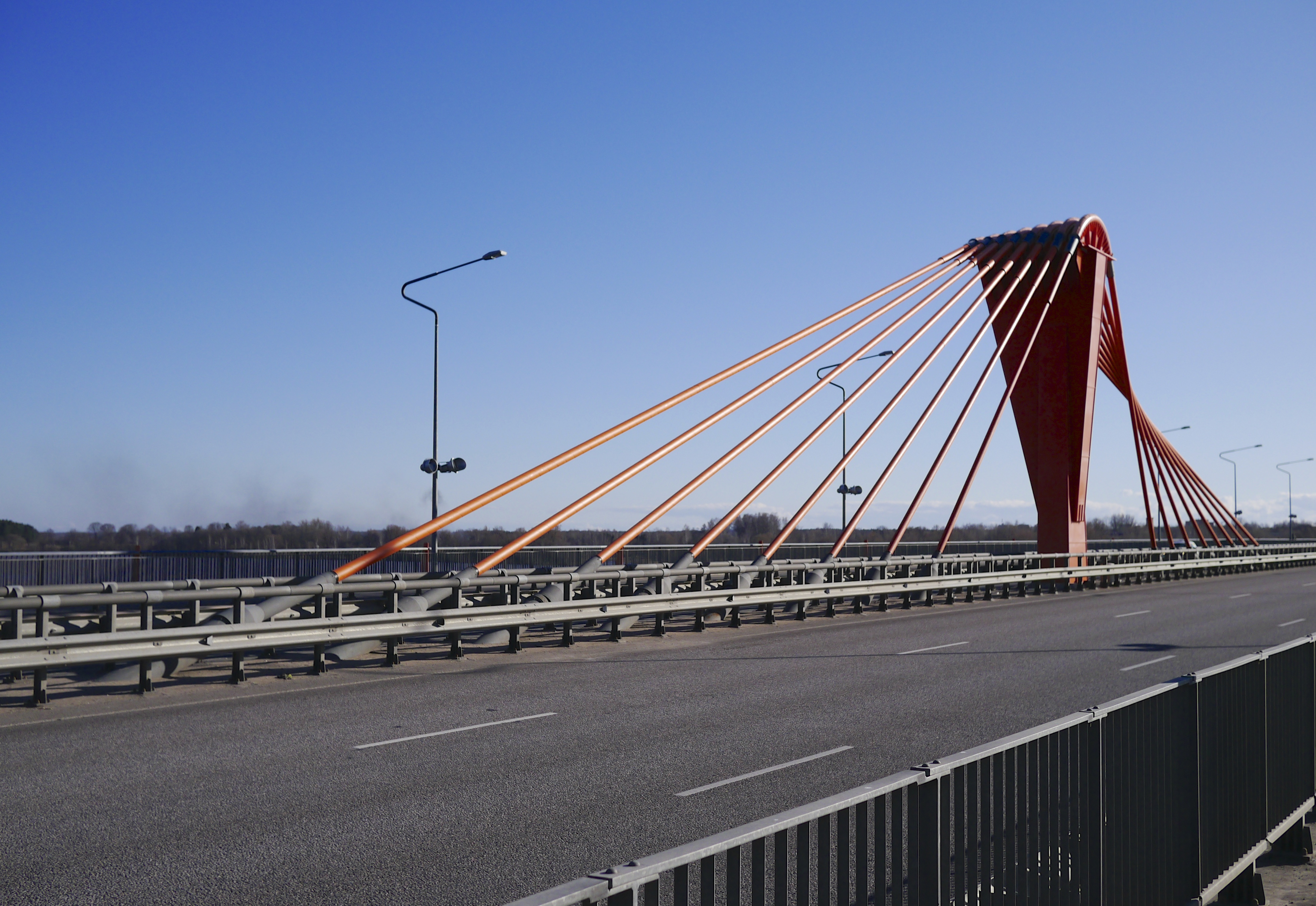
- Coordinates: 56°54′56″N 24°09′26″E
- Carries: six lanes of traffic
- Crosses: Daugava River
- Locale: Riga, Latvia

Characteristics
- Design: extradosed bridge
- Material: Steel, concrete
- Total length: 803 metres (2,635 ft)
- Width: 34.28 metres (112.5 ft)
- Height: 13 metres (43 ft)
- Longest span: 110 metres (360 ft)
- No. of spans: 7
- Clearance above: 8.5 metres (28 ft)

History
- Construction start: 2004
- Construction cost: 811.24 M € (and counting)
- Opened: 2008

The Southern Bridge (Latvian: Dienvidu tilts) is an extradosed bridge built across the Daugava River in Riga, the capital of Latvia. The bridge was constructed between 2004 and 2008, and was opened on November 17, 2008. Construction of the access roads lasted until 2013.

Because of the bridge's huge cost it also become colloquially known as The Golden Bridge (Zelta tilts).

== Construction costs ==
The government control commission in a report for January 2002 to September 2008 showed that, during that period, costs increased fivefold – from a planned 108.84 million lats (154.87 million €) to 570.14 million lats (811.24 million €). In 2011 Riga City Council terminated the agreement with Southern Bridge third round builders due to lack of funds. In early 2012 Riga City Council signed agreement with the new constructors to carry out final works of third stage of the Southern bridge and borrowed an additional seven million euros for funding.

In 2009 The Economy Police launched a criminal case on suspected violations in construction of the bridge. State Audit Office concluded that the Riga City Council had squandered 27 million lats in the construction. In 2013 the students of Stockholm School of Economics in Riga calculated that the same bridge could've been built for a budget two times smaller.
