= North Arm Bridge =

Bridge in Metro Vancouver, British Columbia, Canada

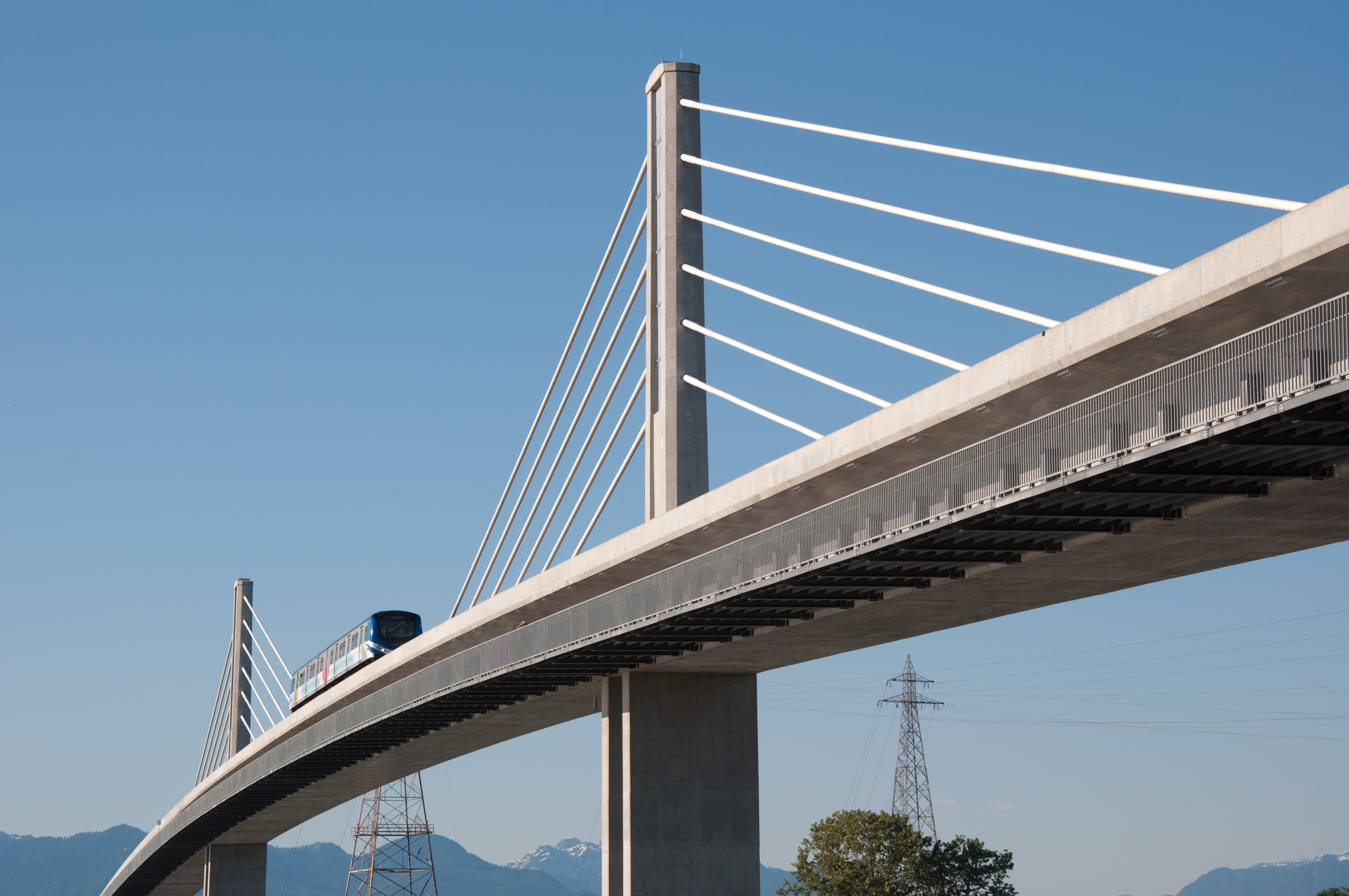
- North Arm Bridge seen from the southwest, with walkway beneath main deck
- Coordinates: 49°12′8″N 123°7′4″W
- Carries: Two tracks of the Canada Line and a pedestrian and bike pathway attached beneath the tracks
- Crosses: North Arm of the Fraser River
- Locale: Vancouver; Richmond

Characteristics
- Total length: 562 m (1,844 ft)
- Height: 47 m (154 ft)
- Longest span: 180 m (590 ft)
- Clearance below: 25 m (82 ft)

History
- Construction cost: $10 million for bike and pedestrian pathway
- Opened: August 14, 2009 (pedestrian-bike walkway); August 17, 2009 (Canada Line tracks)

Location
- Interactive map of North Arm Bridge

The North Arm Bridge is an extradosed bridge in Metro Vancouver, British Columbia, Canada. It spans the north arm of the Fraser River, linking Vancouver to Richmond. It is used by trains on the Canada Line, which opened in August 2009.

The bridge also has a dedicated pedestrian and bicycle pathway underneath its wing on the west side, which was added by Translink at a cost of $10 million.

== Details ==
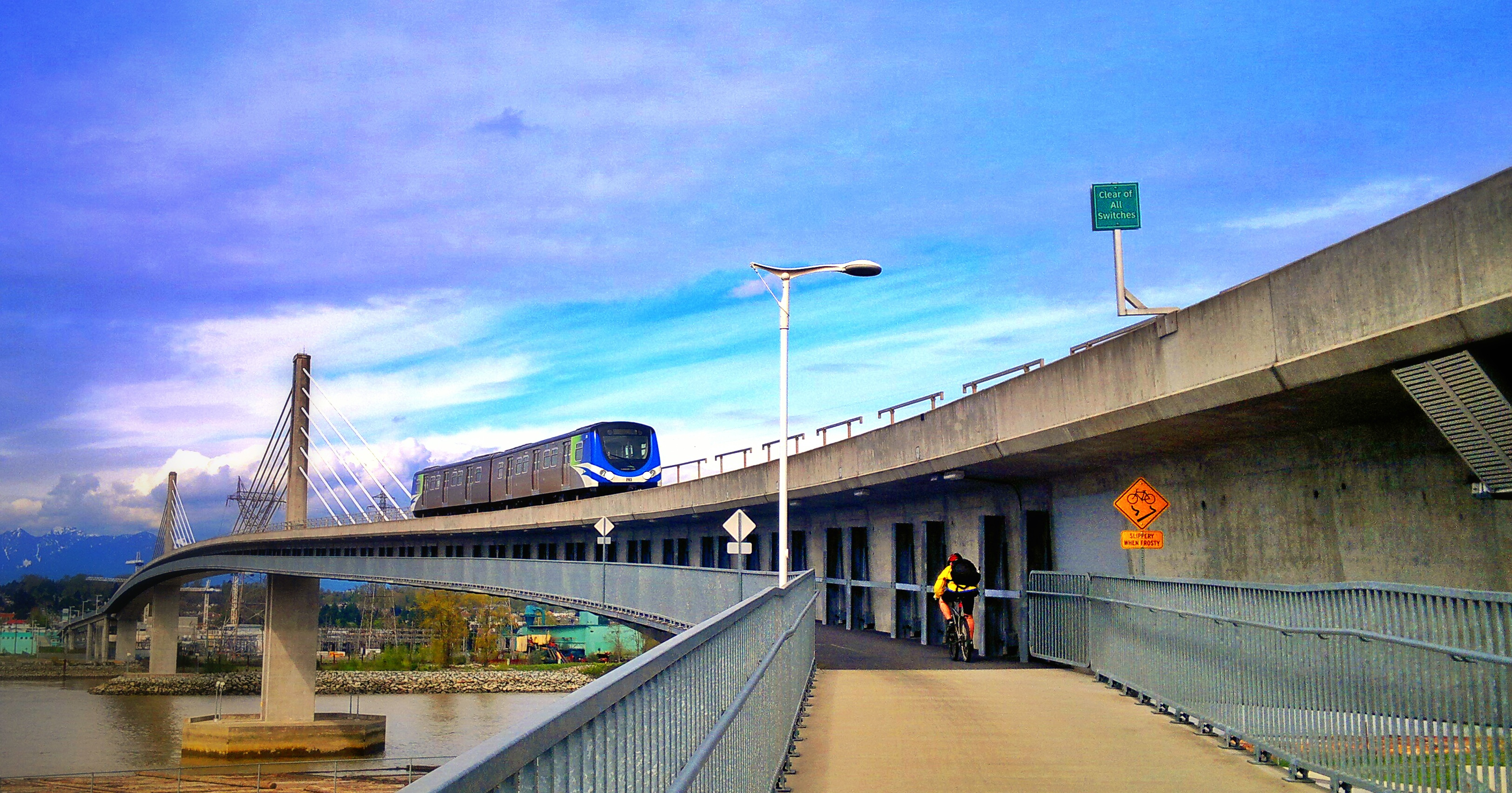
Pedestrian and bicycle pathway beneath the bridge

The North Arm Bridge does not carry automotive vehicles, as the neighbouring Oak Street Bridge does. The bridge has two tracks enabling SkyTrain to pass each other either way traversing the bridge between Bridgeport Station in Richmond and Marine Drive Station in south Vancouver. The main span is 180 metres (590 feet) and has a total length of 562 m (1,844 ft). The bridge deck elevation can go up to 25 metres (82 feet) while the maximum tower elevation is 47 metres (154 feet).

== History ==
Andrew Slobodian died on January 21, 2008, when the crane he was operating during construction tipped over, crushing him. In the middle of the bridge is a small memorial plaque.

== See also ==
- List of crossings of the Fraser River
- List of bridges in Canada
