= New Kelani river bridge =

New Kelani river bridge කල්‍යාණි රන් පිවිසුම පෑලියගොඩ
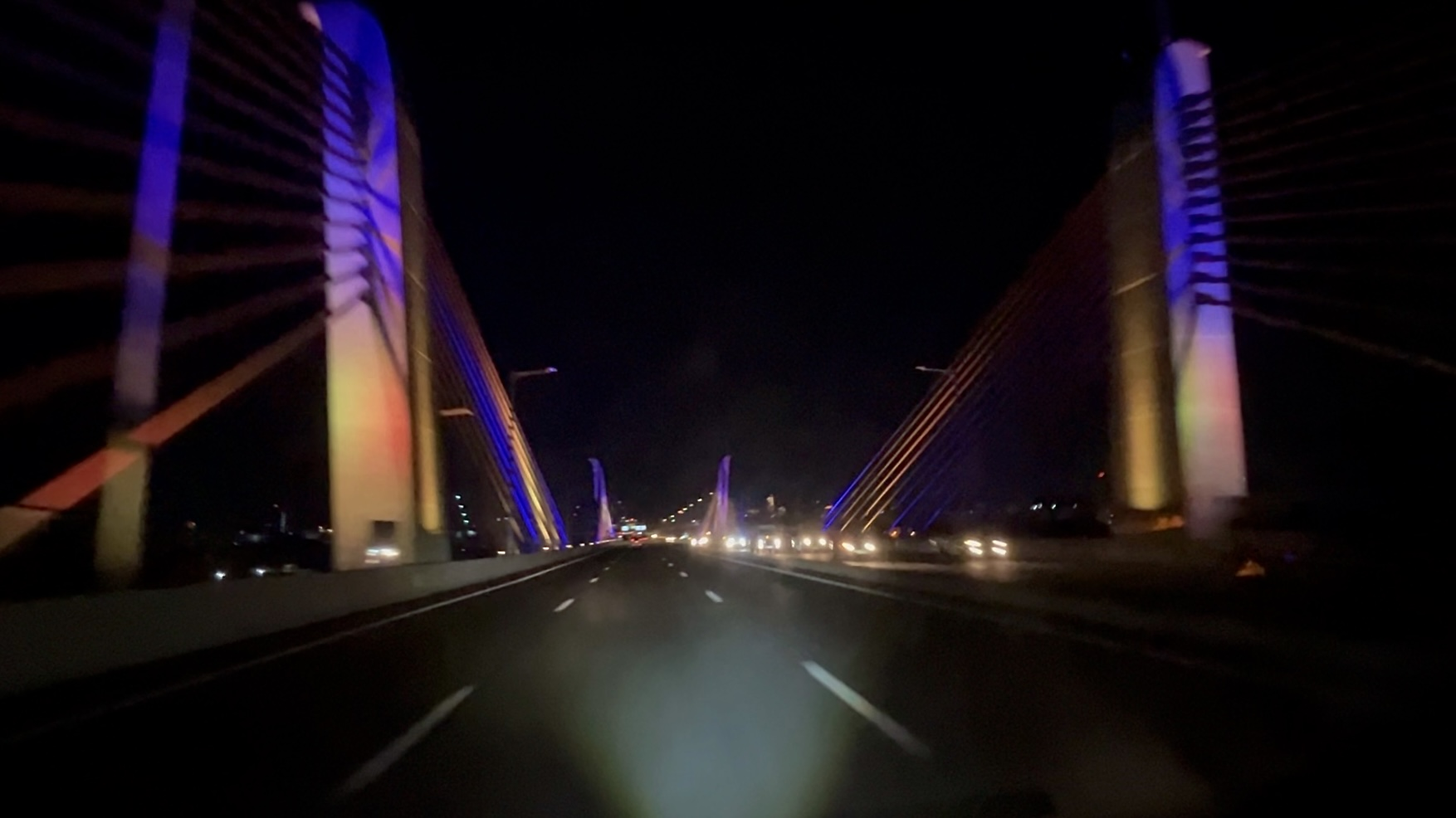
- Coordinates: 6°57′17.4″N 79°52′56.2″E
- Carries: 6 lanes
- Crosses: Kelani River
- Locale: Peliyagoda
- Official name: Golden Gate Kalyani Bridge
- Maintained by: Road Development Authority

Characteristics
- Design: Extradosed bridge
- Material: Steel
- Total length: 1185m
- Longest span: 180m
- No. of spans: 3

History
- Designer: Oriental Consultants Company Limited and Katahira Engineers
- Opened: November 24, 2021

Location
- Interactive map of New Kelani river bridge

The New Kelani River Bridge is a bridge across the Kelani River in the Sri Lankan capital city Colombo. It was constructed in 2021, and is the country's first extradosed bridge.
