= Panoli, Gujarat =

Panoli
- village
- Location within Gujarat Location within India
- Coordinates: 21.531060°N 72.963773°E
- Country: India
- State: Gujarat
- District: Bharuch
- Elevation: 194 m (636 ft)

Population (29)
  - Total: 5,000

Languages
  - Official: Gujarati
- Time zone: UTC+5:30 (IST)
- PIN: 394115
- Telephone code: 00-91-02646 / 00-91-2646
- Vehicle registration: GJ 16
- Website: gujaratindia.com www.panoli.in

Panoli is a village in the Ankleshwar Tehsil of Bharuch district in the Indian state of Gujarat.

== Location ==
Panoli is based between 21.5310601 latitude and 72.9637728 longitude. It is based in the Ankleshwar Tehsil, with the city of Ankleshwar being 10.0 km (6.2 miles) to the north. The major cities nearby are Surat and Bharuch. Panoli is located about 40.0 km (24.9 miles) from Surat by road and 20.0 km (12.4 miles) from Bharuch by road. NH 8 offers excellent connectivity to the village as it is only about 4.0 km (2.5 miles) away. However, the most important method of transport is the western railway, which is connected by the Panoli station.

== Local Economy ==
The land around the village is Rich Black Cotton Soil although large parts of the land lay barren. Most of the locals are involved in traditional industries.

=== Industries ===
The Southwestern part of Panoli is a Gujarat Industrial Development Corporation estate. The industrial estate will have direct access to the Port of Dahej and Hazira Port.

== Education ==
School and Islamic center

- The Sarvajanik High School
- Madresa Muhammadiya Arabiyah
- Madresa Hayatussalihat Trust of School and Madresa
- Madresa Jamiah Hamidiah
- Public school, which located near at panoli gidc

=== Nearby colleges ===
- Arts & Commerce College Of Sarbhan, Sarbhan
- J M Shah Jambusar, Tankari Bhagol Jambusar
- Shri Manubhai Rambhai Amin B.Ed College at Bayad Road Pahadiya, Velapura – 382315; Taluk: Dahegam; District: Gandhinagar
- Shri Laxminarayandev College Of Pharmacy, Tulsidham Jhadeshwar Road, Bharuch
- Mahamandleshwar Shri Krishnanandji Law College, Bharuch District.

== See also ==
- Gulf of Khambhat
- Hansot
- South Gujarat
