= Earthquake Memorial Bridge =

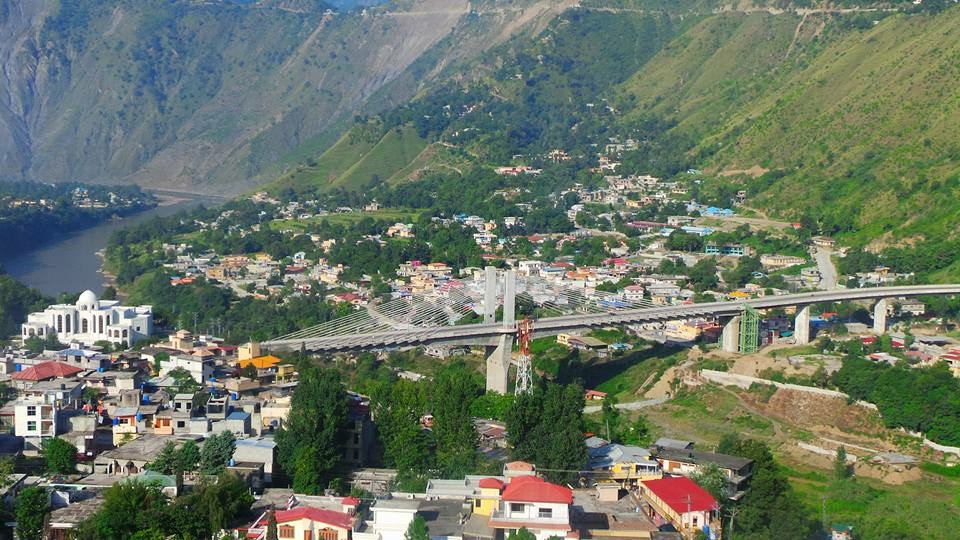
- Coordinates: 34°20′52.5″N 73°27′49.5″E
- Carries: Cars, buses, trucks, jeeps
- Crosses: River Jhelum
- Locale: Kohala–Muzaffarabad Road, Muzaffarabad, Azad Kashmir
- Other name(s): Zulfiqar Ali Bhutto Bridge; Naluchi Bridge
- Maintained by: National Highway Authority

Characteristics
- Design: Cable-stayed bridge
- Total length: 474 metres (1,555 ft)
- No. of lanes: 2

History
- Designer: Japan International Cooperation Agency
- Construction start: May 2009
- Construction end: August 2014
- Construction cost: Rs. 1.5 billion
- Opening: 14 August 2014

Location
- Interactive map of Earthquake Memorial Bridge

Earthquake Memorial Bridge, also known as Zulfiqar Ali Bhutto Bridge and Naluchi Bridge, is a 474 meter long cable-stayed extradosed bridge in Muzaffarabad, Azad Kashmir, connecting Naluchi and Chattar on the banks of Jhelum River. The bridge, costing over Rs. 1.5 billion, was funded by Japan Bank for International Cooperation and was completed in August 2014 after meeting delays. It features two lanes and sidewalks on either side. The bridge is 15 meters wide in total.
