= Kansai Paint =

Japanese chemical company

Kansai Paint Co., Ltd.

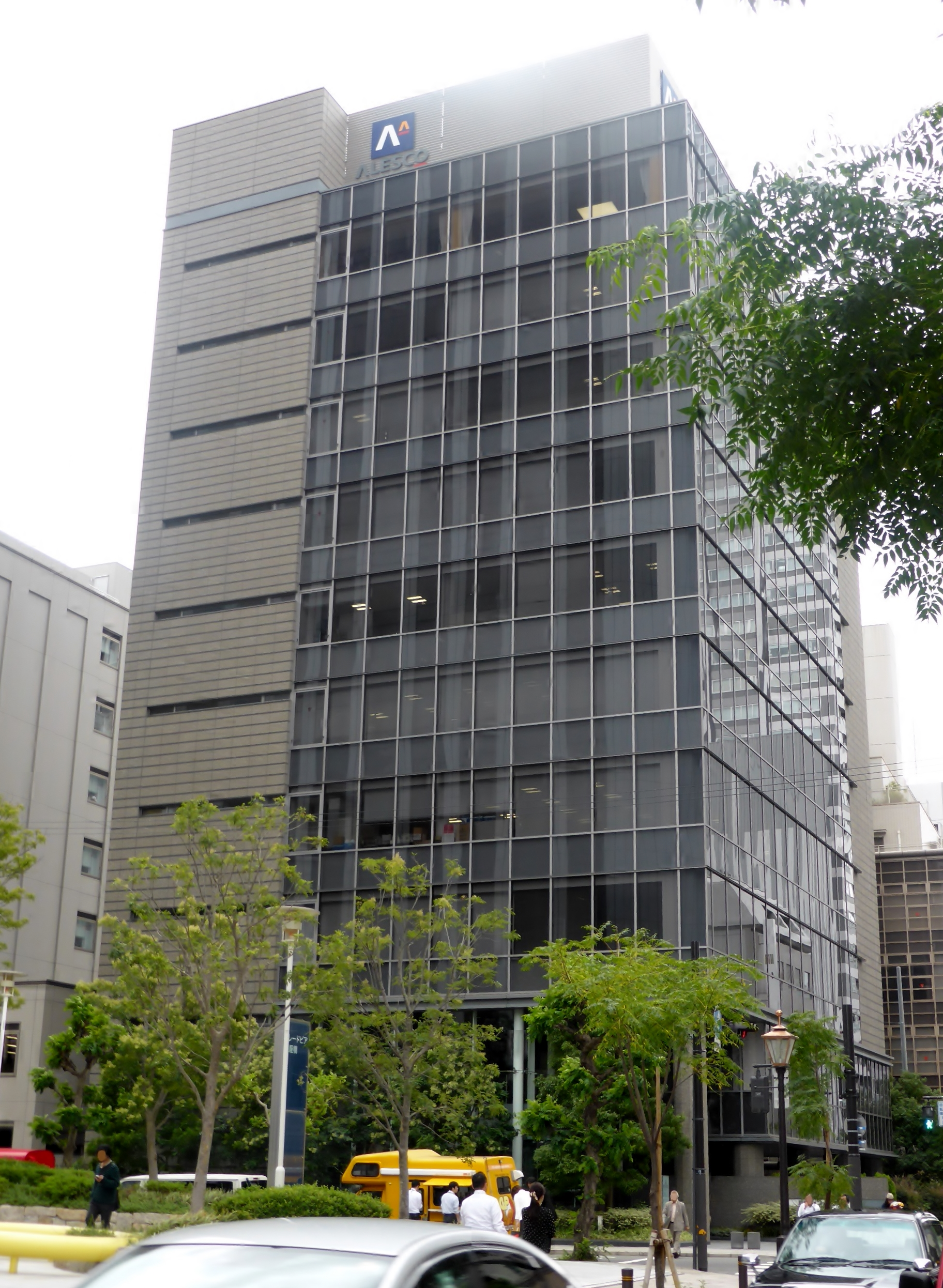
- The company headquarters building in Osaka
- Native name: 関西ペイント株式会社
- Romanized name: Kansai Peinto Kabushiki-gaisha
- Company type: Public KK
- Traded as: TYO: 4613
- Industry: Chemicals
- Founded: Amagasaki (May 17, 1918; 108 years ago)
- Founder: Katsujiro Iwai
- Headquarters: Imabashi, Chuo-ku, Osaka, Japan
- Key people: Kunishi Mori (President)
- Products: Chemical substances; Paints; Industrial finishing; Coatings
- Revenue: ▲¥419 billion (2021)
- Operating income: ▲¥30 billion (2021)
- Net income: ▲¥26.5 billion (2021)
- Total assets: ▲¥600 billion (2021)
- Total equity: ▲¥300 billion (2021)
- Number of employees: 15,670 (2022)
- Subsidiaries: Kansai Nerolac Paints; Kansai Plascon
- Website: www.kansai.com

Kansai Paint Co., Ltd. (関西ペイント株式会社, Kansai Peinto Kabushiki-gaisha) is a Japanese, Osaka-based chemical company whose main products are automotive, industrial and decorative coatings.

The company is one of the world's top ten paint manufacturers with manufacturing sites in over 43 countries across the world.

Kansai Paint is a member of the Mitsubishi UFJ Financial Group (MUFJ) keiretsu.

== Products ==
- Automotive coatings
- Automotive refinish coatings
- Industrial coatings
- Decorative coatings
- Protective coatings
- Marine coatings
- Coatings for personal use

== Sponsorship ==
In January 2013, the company signed a three-year sponsorship deal with the English football club Manchester United.
