= Gujarat Industrial Development Corporation =

State government agency in Gujarat, India

- ગુજરાત ઔદ્યોગિક વિકાસ નિગમ

Agency overview
- Formed: 1 August 1962
- Preceding agency: Board of Industrial Development (BID)
- Jurisdiction: Government of Gujarat
- Headquarters: Gandhinagar, Gujarat, India
- Ministers responsible: Harsh Sanghavi, Minister for Industries; Shri Kamal Dayani, IAS, Additional Chief Secretary, Industries & Mines Department
- Agency executives: Dr. Rahul Gupta, IAS, Hon. Vice Chairman & Managing Director; Jai Prakash Shivahare, IAS, Managing Director, Gujarat Urja Vikas Nigam Ltd; Ms. Manisha Chandra, IAS, Secretary (Expenditure), Finance Department; Shri S.B.Vasava, Secretary(Road & Building Department)
- Website: https://gidc.gujarat.gov.in

Map

Gujarat Industrial Development Corporation (GIDC) was established under the Gujarat Industrial Development Act of 1962, with a goal of accelerating industrialization in the state of Gujarat, India.

== History ==
Main role of the GIDC is to identify locations suitable for industrial development and create industrial estates with infrastructure such as roads, drainage, electricity, water supply, street lights, and ready-to-occupy factory sheds. The infrastructure of certain estates has been built for specific industries; there is an electronics estate at Gandhinagar, ceramics and manufacturing estates in Bhavnagar, chemical estates at Vapi, Ankleshwar, Panoli, Nandesari, Naroda.

Some GIDC estates also have low-cost housing for workers and executives of tenant businesses, and many of the larger estates include amenities and commercial facilities such as banks, shopping complexes, schools, dispensaries, telecommunications centers, police stations, and community halls.

As of February 2008, there are 257 such estates throughout Gujarat, and economies of scale allow the GIDC to offer these plots for substantially less than the cost of creating a similar standalone factory. GIDC has acquired maximum land for the development of Industries in the State of Gujarat, under their possession after Indian Railways.

Famous industrialists like Dhirubhai Ambani of Reliance and Karsanbhai Patel of (Nirma) have their industrial units in GIDC.

Corporation has established 182 industrial estates, ranging from mini to mega sizes, in 25 of the 25 districts of the state. It has also developed 7 Special Economic Zones.

== Major SIRs and SEZs ==
=== Special Investment Regions ===
GIDC is now establishing Special Investment Regions, PCPIR, Industrial areas and large /sector-specific estates in tune with the changing economic and industrial scenario.

== Notified Areas ==
The places that are recognized by the government as Notified Areas are given below:

Sr. No.	Name of District/Estates	Area in Hectatres	Notification Date for Declaring the area as Notified Area
I	ANAND		
1	V.U.Nagar	125.00	06-05-'75
1(a)	V.U.Nagar(Exp.)	193.00	05-08-'97
2	Vasana(Borsad)	19.00	23-09-'98
II	VADODARA		
3	Nandesari	230.00	06-05-'75
4	P.C.C. Area *	1345.00	06-05-'75
4(a)	P.C.C. Area (Exp.)		21-01-'88
5	G.S.F.C. (Baroda) *	323.00	21-08-'87
6	Waghodia	338.00	28-06-'98
7	Por - Ramangamdi	134.63	4/1/2001
8	Savli	832.75	14-03-'11
III	PANCHMAHAL		
9	Kalol	71.83	7/9/1993
10	Halol	471.46	16-09-10
IV	BHARUCH		
11	Ankleshwar	1072.00	1/2/1978
11(a)	Ankleshwar(Exp.)		06-09-'93
12	Bharuch	557.00	19-09-'85
13	Valla - Jhagadia (GNFC)		06-09-'93
14	Panoli	1053.00	10-09-'98
15	Valia (Gujrat Godrej)	206.00	09-05-'01
16	Jhagadia	1838.98	20-01'11
17	Palej	156.03	01-08-'12
18	Vilayat	535-98	1/8/2013
V	SURAT		
19	Sachin	703.87	07-09-'93
20	Hazira *	5267.05	30-01-'97
20(a)	Hazira(Expansion)	42.48	18/05/2013
20(b)	Hazira(Expansion ll)	271.97	21/06/2013
21	Magdalla	53.43	11-02-'09
21(a)	Magdalla(Expansion)	11-99	18-07-'13
VI	Valsad		
22	valsad	108.00	06-05-'75
22(a)	Valsad(Wxp.)		08-01-'90
23	Umbergam	197.00	06-05-'75
24	Vapi	939.00	06-05-'75
25	Sarigam	509.00	05-05-'97
VII	GANDHINAGAR		
26	Kalol(NG)	55.30	07-09-'93
27	Chhatral	188.99	06-09-'93
VIII	JAMNAGAR		
28	GSFC Motikhavdi - Sikka Project *	264.00	03-11-'98
29	Reliance Complex Motikhavdi *	2388.00	08-09-'08
29(a)	Reliance Complex Motikhavdi (Expansion)	471.70	24-08-'13
IX	Bhavnagar		
30	Alang - Sosiya	1251'00	7/2/2000
X	RAJKOT		
31	Lodhika	424.13	18-06-'08
32	Aji GIDC	Shapar Veraval GIDC	
Note	(1) - GIDC Notified areas Declared ** (2) - Private Notified area declared		
