= Amod (newspaper) =

Major weekly newspaper published in Bangladesh

Weekly Amod
- Type: Weekly newspaper
- Format: Broadsheet
- Founder: Mohammed Fazle Rabbi (founding editor)
- Publisher: Bakin Rabbi
- Editor-in-chief: Bakin Rabbi
- Editor: Shamsun Nehar Rabbi
- Founded: 5 May 1955
- Language: Bengali
- Headquarters: Chowdury Para; Comilla, Bangladesh
- Website: www.amodbd.com

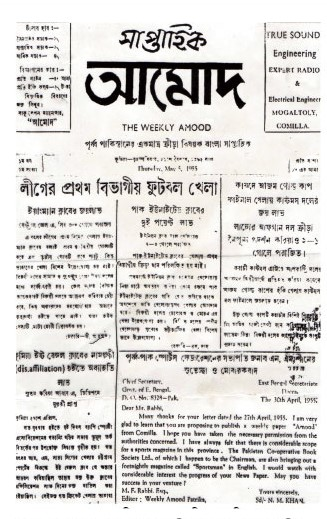
The first issue of Amod

Amod is a Bengali weekly newspaper published in Comilla, Bangladesh. The long-running community newspaper claims to be the oldest weekly newspaper in the country as it has been published since 5 May 1955.

== Staff ==
Mohammed Fazle Rabbi, who died 28 November 1994, was the founding editor of Amod. Journalists who worked under him were Taheruddin Thakur, Anil Karmaker, and Mobarak Hossain Khan. The newspaper is operated by Rabbi's wife, Shamsun Nehar Rabbi, and son, Bakin Rabbi, who is the printer, publisher and editor-in-chief.

== Comilla market ==
Although the Weekly Amod has faced competition from other weeklies, Mohammed Fazle Rabbi believed his first serious competitor was Comilla's first daily newspaper Rupashi Bangla, which started in 1979.

== Recognition within Asia ==
Weekly Amod was recognized in 1985 by UNESCO after three decades of publishing news. The Amod remains competitive. Crispin C. Maslog in the book 5 Successful Asian Community Newspapers writes, "Amod continues to be the leading community newspaper in Comilla because it has been a steady, reliable source of information and the mouthpiece for community opinion in the past three decades." Others say it is the long run of the newspaper that has given it a special authority within the Comilla community.
