= Personera =

South African technology startup

- Website type: Personalized Print Product Creation
- Founded: Cape Town, South Africa (February, 2008)
- Headquarters: Cape Town, South Africa
- Founders: Sheraan Amod; Jaco de Wet; Michael Champanis
- Key people: Sheraan Amod (CEO); Jaco de Wet (COO)
- Industry: Internet
- Website: www.personera.com
- Launched: 11 November 2009

Personera is a technology startup based in Cape Town, South Africa. It allows the use of variable data printing technology to create customized on-demand print products that are personalized with a user's Facebook content (such as photos, events and friends’ birthdays). These products are printed by commercial printers and delivered.

== History ==
Personera was founded in February 2008 by Sheraan Amod and Jaco de Wet, both MSc students at Stellenbosch University. Michael Champanis, a University of Cape Town graduate, also joined the team as a co-founder.

On November 11, 2009, Personera launched its public beta – a hard-copy personalized Facebook calendar, which includes users’ photos, birthdays and events.

The company's headquarters are currently located in Cape Town, South Africa.

== Technology ==
Personera's personalized print platform is built using variable data printing technology and Facebook’s API. Users' Facebook content is placed into predesigned layouts, with users having the ability to choose which specific photos to use and to manually input additional events. Personera's method of producing a printed product is currently patent pending under the World Intellectual Property Organization.

== Investors ==
Personera has secured $9k in seed funding and $125k in angel funding to date. Investors include Vinny Lingham, Michael Leeman and Tom Van den Berckt.
