= Silver Jubilee Railway Bridge Bharuch =

Bridge in India

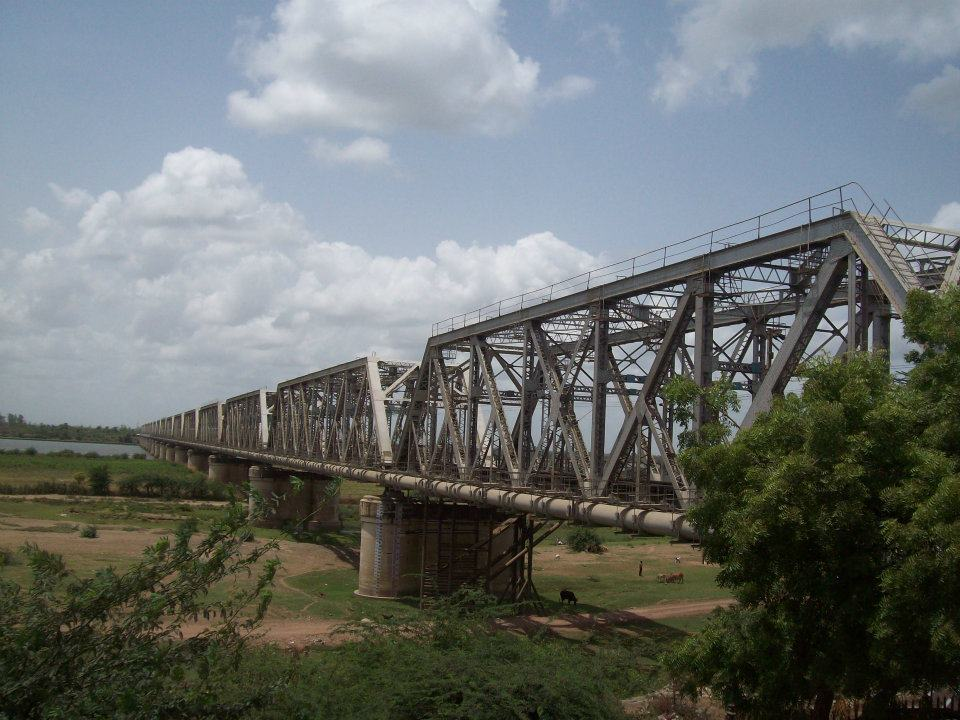
- Coordinates: 21.6925°N 73.0028°E
- Carries: Railway (2 tracks)
- Crosses: Narmada River
- Official name: Silver Jubilee Bridge
- Other name: Narmada Bridge
- ID number: 502

Characteristics
- Design: Truss bridge
- Material: Steel
- Total length: 1,406.68 metres (4,615.1 ft)
- No. of spans: 17

History
- Engineering design by: Rendel, Palmer and Tritton
- Constructed by: Braithwaite & Co.
- Construction start: 1933
- Construction end: 1935
- Opened: 20 December 1935

Location
- Interactive map of Silver Jubilee Railway Bridge Bharuch

The Silver Jubilee Railway Bridge Bharuch is a railway bridge over the Narmada River in India, located between the Ankleshwar Junction and Bharuch Junction railway stations.

== History ==
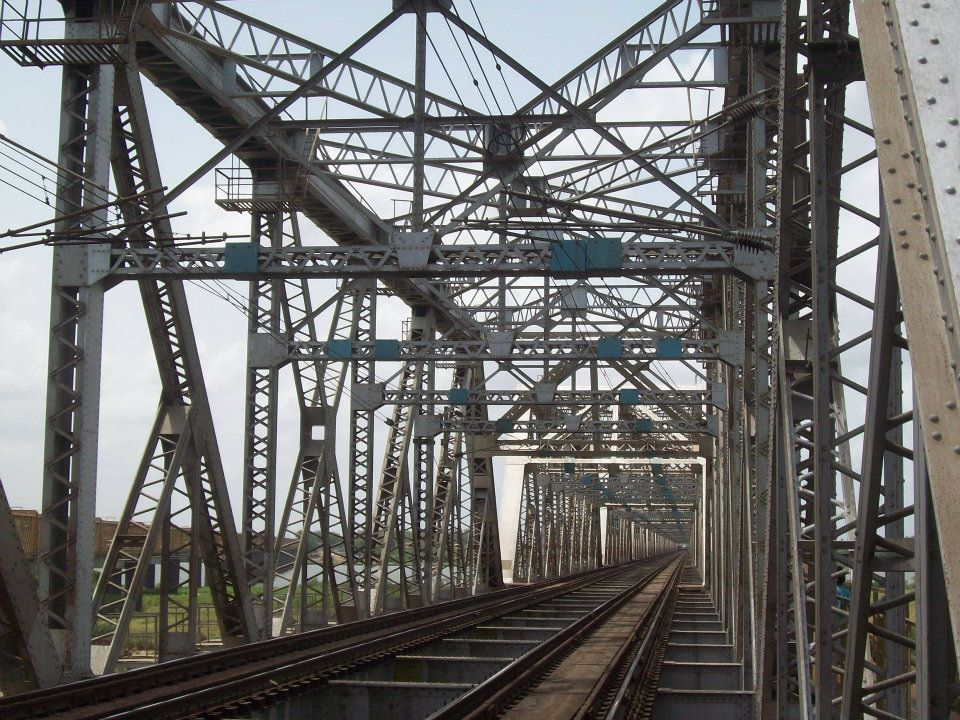

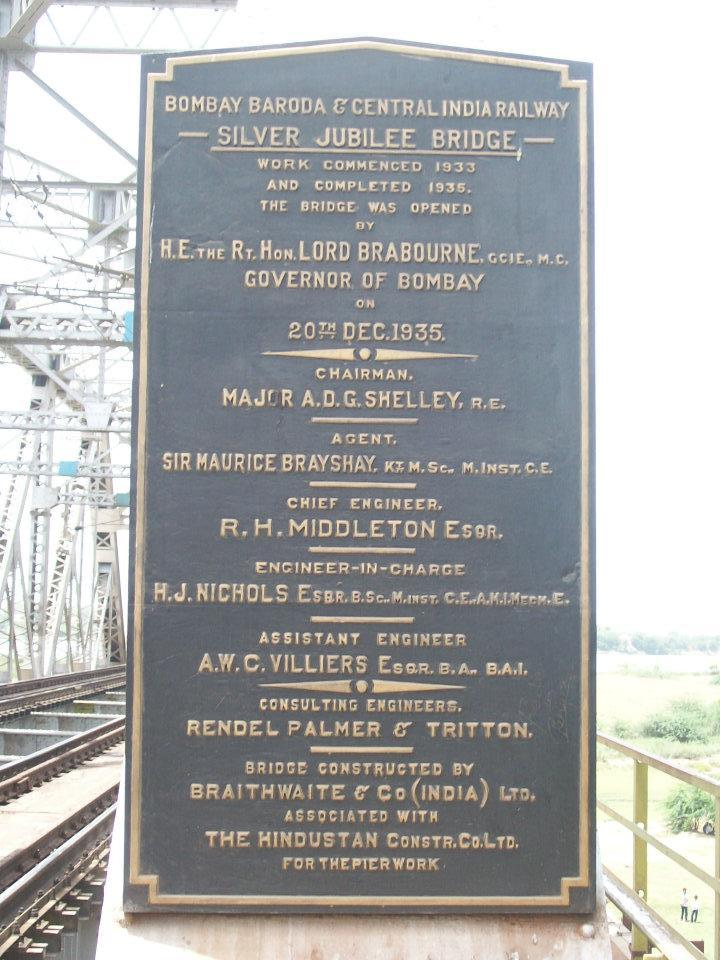
Bridge memorial plaque

The bridge was constructed for the Bombay, Baroda and Central India Railway. It was built by Braithwaite & Co. in association with the Hindustan Construction Company, who built the piers. The bridge was named in honour of the fat, silver jubilee of King-Emperor George V.

Construction work began in 1933. The bridge was completed in 1935 and inaugurated on 20 December 1935 by Michael Knatchbull, 5th Baron Brabourne, the Governor of Bombay. It is 1,406.68 metres (4,615.1 ft) long, with 17 spans. Of the bridge's spans, one is 18.28 metres (60.0 ft) long, another is 76.20 metres (250.0 ft) and the remaining 15 spans are 87.48 metres (287.0 ft) each. The girders of the bridge were built of mild steel. The bridge was damaged in July 1970 by an earthquake.

The bridge carries a double-track electrified railway line. The adjacent Golden Bridge, which was completed in 1881, carries road traffic. The 3rd Narmada Bridge, completed in 2017, is located approximately 4.8 kilometres (3 miles) to the northeast.

== See also ==
- List of longest bridges above water in India
