= Dhamandevi =

Village in Maharashtra

Coordinates: 17.5749°N 73.4964°E

- Village
- Interactive map of Dhamandevi
- Country: India
- State: Maharashtra
- District: Ratnagiri

Population
  - Total: 2,758

Dhamandevi is a village in Khed Tehsil, Ratnagiri district, Maharashtra, India. Its population is 2,758.
