= Naluchi =

Neighborhood in Pakistan

Naluchi (Urdu: نالوچی) is a neighborhood in Muzaffarabad, Azad Kashmir, Pakistan. The neighborhood is located on the western bank of Jhelum River with the Western Bypass Road to the north, and Abbottabad Highway to the west.
