= Amod (SugandhPur) =

Town in Bharuch, Gujarat, India

Coordinates: 21.991°N 72.871°E

Amod is a town in the Bharuch district, Gujarat, India. Its population is about 30,000. It was a Princely state before Independence, and was founded in 1486.

== Demographics of the Bharuch district ==
According to the 2011 census Bharuch district has a population of 1,550,822, roughly equal to the nation of Gabon or the US state of Hawaii. This gives it a ranking of 321st in India (out of a total of 640). The district has a population density of 238 inhabitants per square kilometre (620/sq mi) . Its population growth rate over the decade 2001-2011 was 13.14%. Bharuch has a sex ratio of 924 females for every 1000 males, and a literacy rate of 83.03%.

The primary religious grouping is Hinduism, although Muslims make a significant minority in the district at 27%. This area is also home to the Muslim Vohra Patel community.
