= Ankleshwar =

Town in Gujarat, India

Ankleshwar Aṁkalēśvara Ankaleshwar
- City
- Location within Gujarat Location within India
- Country: India
- State: Gujarat
- District: Bharuch
- Founder: Gurjar king Dadda II

Government
  - Type: Municipal Corporation
  - Body: Ankleshwar Municipal Corporation, Notified Area Authority
- Time zone: UTC+5:30 (IST)

Ankleshwar (sometimes written Ankaleshwar; ISO: Aṁkalēśvara) is a city in the Bharuch district in the state of Gujarat, India. The city is located 14 kilometres from Bharuch. The village of Adadara is in Ankleshwar division.

== History ==
Ankleshaar was once known as Akrureshwar-Ankuleshwar. It is mentioned in the land grant inscriptions, or Dana shasans, issued by Gurjar king Dadda II in between 629 and 643 A.D. at that time, the area was referred to as a "vishaya", meaning an administrative district.

== Industry ==
Ankleshwar Industrial Association (AIA) is the largest organisation of the Gujarat Industrial Development Corporation, where over 2000 industries are registered.

Ankleshwar is a hub of the chemical industry in India. One aggregation of plants, the Ankleshwar Industrial Estate, produces more than 5 percent of India's output of chemical products, including pharmaceuticals and dyes. Pollution is regulated by the Gujarat Pollution Control Board, which charges the AIA with self-enforcement of its constituent organisations.

== Transport ==
Ankleshwar is connected by Indian National Highway 8 (Mumbai to New Delhi) and by the Western Railway Division of Indian Railways. The railway division runs the broad gauge train services to Rajpipla. The 140-year-old (2021) Golden Bridge built in (1881) connects Ankleshwar to Bharuch across the Narmada on the station front while a new bridge connects the highway, the other bridge made by L&T on the highway is now ready to use.

Ankleshwar railway station is centrally located at the intersection of NH8 & Station Road.

Ankleshwar City Bus stand is located on Station Road (i.e. located in the city, the western section).

Development project of Ankleshwar Airport & City Bus are in pipe line in the last stage.

== Notable people ==
Anklesaria, a toponymic surname for Ankleshwar, is found among Parsis from India:

- Saniya Anklesaria, an Indian actress
- Shahnaz Aiyar (d. 2015), Indian writer, wife of Swaminathan Aiyar
