= Nandgola =

Village in Bhagalpur, Bihar, India

- village
- Location within Bihar Location within India
- Coordinates: 25.3387°N 87.2743°E
- Country: India
- State: Bihar
- District: Bhagalpur
- Block: Kahalgaon
- Regional Language: Angika
- Assembly constituency: Pirpainti Assembly constituency
- village panchayat: Antichak

Population (2011)
  - Total: 1,667

Language
  - Official: Hindi
  - Additional official: Urdu
  - Regional: Angika
- Time zone: UTC+5:30 (IST)
- Postal code: 813203

Nandgola is a village located in the Kahalgaon block of Bhagalpur district in Bihar, India. It is situated 12 km away from the town of Kahalgaon and 42 km away from the district headquarter Bhagalpur. The village located near to Vikramashila and Bateshwar hills. Nandgola is part of a Antichak village panchayat.

== Demographics ==
In the 2011 census, Nandgola had a total population of 1,667 people, out of which male population was 922 while female population was 745. Literacy rate of Nandgola was 61.58% out of which 65.30% males and 56.84% females were literate. There were about 344 households in the village.

== Geography ==
The total geographical area of the village is 212 hectares. Bhagalpur is the nearest city to Nandgola for all major economic activities, which is located approximately 42 km away. This village located bank of the Ganga River

== Places of Interest ==
- Vikramashila ancient University (2.7 km for Village)
- Bateshwar hills (3 km for Village)
- Ganga balu ghat (2.7 km for Village)
- Kahalgaon Super Thermal Power Station (16 km for Village)

== Language ==
The Primary language spoken in the village is Angika. Most of the people understand and can speak Hindi as well.
