= Bateshwar =

Bateshwar may refer to:

- Bateshwar, Uttar Pradesh, a village in India
  - Bateshwar Halt railway station
- Wari-Bateshwar ruins, an ancient fort city dating back to 450 BC in Bangladesh
- Bateshwar, Morena, an ancient site in Morena district, Madhya Pradesh, India
- Bateshwar hills, Purnia district, Bihar, India
- Bateshwar Rural Municipality, Nepal
- Bateshwar Hembram (1931–2018), Indian politician
