= Partapnagar =

Partapnagar may refer to the following locations in Bihar, India:

- Partapnagar, Bhagalpur, a village in Bhagalpur district
- Partapnagar, Supaul, a village in Supaul district

== See also ==
- Pratapnagar (disambiguation)
