= Uttarvahini Ganga =

The term Uttarvahini Ganga is used to refer to places where the Ganges river has a northward flow.

For the majority of its route, the Ganges flows in a generally southeasterly direction, from the gangotri glacier to its delta emptying into the Bay of Bengal. However, there are several places where the meandering of the river leads to a northerly flow, which is considered auspicious among Hindus.

== Significant places of Uttarvahini Ganga ==
=== Uttarakhand ===
==== Haridwar ====
Haridwar is a holy place of Hindus. ‘Hari’ terms belongs to Lord Vishnu and ‘Dwar’ represents door. Also known as Hari Dham. Here Ganga is Uttarayan for a little.

=== Uttar Pradesh ===
==== Kashi ====
In Kashi, the Ganges has a more distinct northerly flow than at Haridwar. The Ganges here merges with five more rivers like Varuna and Assi. which is why this place is also known as Varanasi. It is said that Kashi is set on the Trishul of Lord Shiva.

==== Bhriguthaura ====
In Bhriguthaura, the Ganges has a more distinct northerly flow than at Haridwar.

=== Bihar ===
Barh

Barh, a city in Patna district located on the bank of Uttarwahini Ganges. One of the holiest & historic temple of Hindu of Lord Shiva also known as UMANATH located on the bank of Uttarwahini Ganga. The temple is the famous spot of pilgrimage of locals in Sawan month. People came over here from different places to put Gangajal in sawan month over shivling.

==== Munger ====
kastaharani ghaat ref>"Uttarvahini Ganga in Munger".

==== Bhagalpur ====
The Uttarvahini Ganga's impact in the Bhagalpur region has effects on Naugachia, Sultanganj and Kahalgaon, which plays a pivotal role in the spiritual culture of this ancient city. Bhagalpur has been culturally rich and a centre of religion, culture, education, trade etc. from ancient times.

===== Sultanganj =====
In Sultanganj, Ganga is uttarvahini for almost half kilometers, where the holy Ajgaivinath Temple is situated. Every year during the holy month of Sawan, millions of devotees of Lord Shiva take the water of holy river as ‘Ganga Jal’ to 110 km from here to Baidyanath Temple, for the ‘jalabhisheka’.

==== Kahalgaon ====
Here the Ganges covers a long distance as Uttarvahini for 6 kilometres. From Kahalgaon to Bateshwar Sthan, the Ganges is completely Uttarvahini. Here the Koshi and Ganges rivers merge, where Maharishi Vashistha is believed to have worshiped. Identifying the importance of this place, in 8th century, King Dharampal of Pal Dynasty, formed the World famous Vikramshila Mahavihara in this place.
