= Prashastdih =

- Village
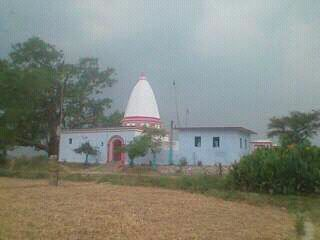
- Prashastdih Shiva Temple

- Location in Bihar, India Prashastdih (India)
- Coordinates: 25.1749384°N 87.123849°E
- Country: India
- State: Bihar
- District: Bhagalpur

Population
  - Total: 6,000+
  - Density: 1,000/km^{2} (2,600/sq mi)

Languages
  - Official: Hindi, Angika
  - Other spoken: Hindi
- Time zone: UTC+5:30 (IST)
- Pin Code: 813205
- ISO 3166 code: IN-BR

Prashastdih is a village in Bhagalpur district, Bihar, India. The village is located 15 km away from Sabour in Kahalgaon block and about 24 km from Bhagalpur. Prashastdih has population of more than 10,000. Nearby towns are Bhagalpur, Ghogha. This is a historical village of Bihar that contains many of famous temples.
