= Naugachhia (disambiguation) =

Naugachhia is a town in Bhagalpur district, Bihar, India.

Naugachhia may also refer to:

- Naugachia railway station, in Naugachhia
- Naugachhia Block, a community development block in Bhagalpur district
- Naugachhia subdivision, one of the three subdivisions of Bhagalpur
