= Bateshwar hills =

Historical and religious site near Kahalgaon, Bihar, India

Bateshwar Hills
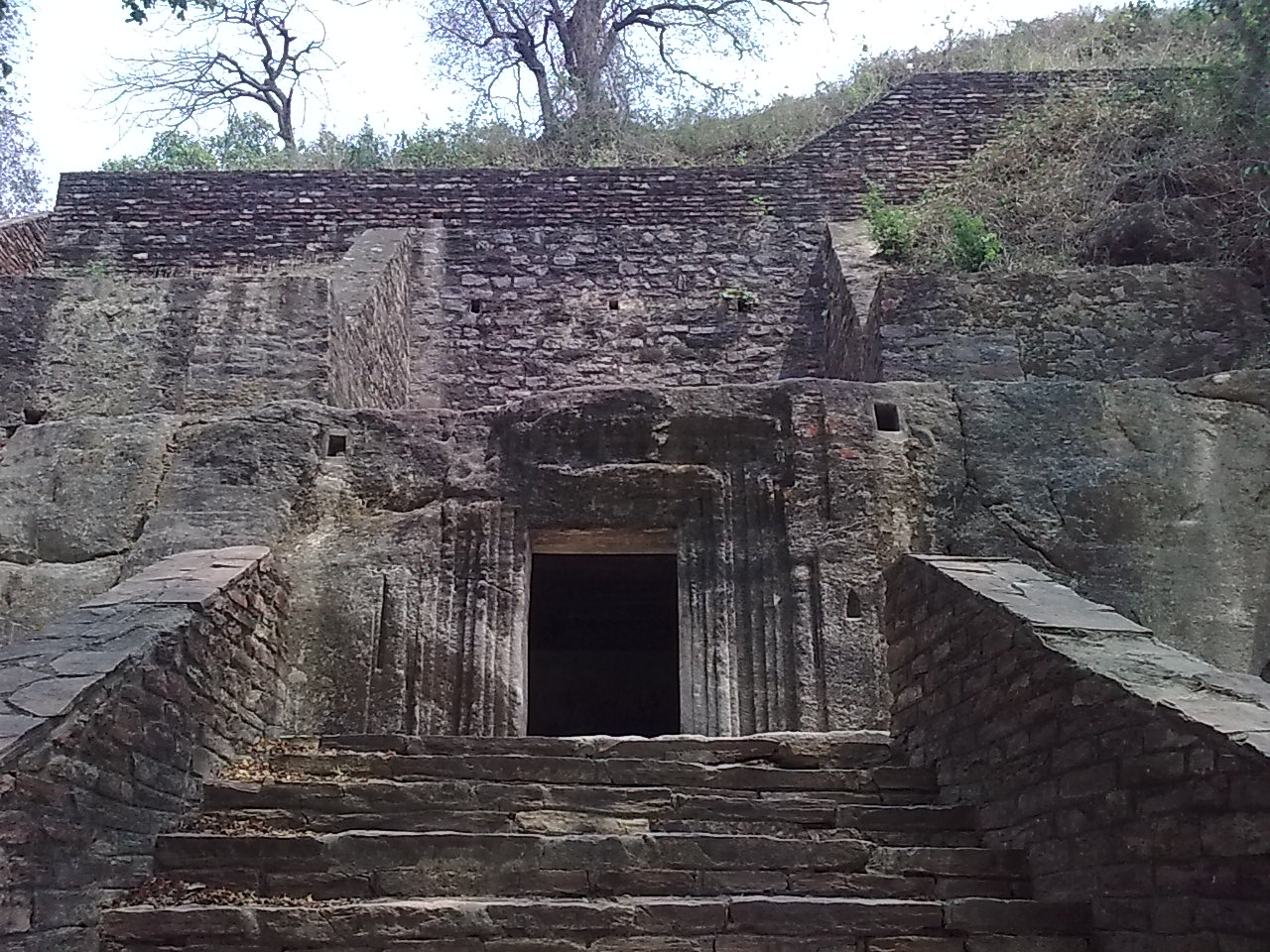
- Bateshwar Hills near Kahalgaon

Geography
- Location: Kahalgaon,Bhagalpur district, Bihar, India

Bateshwar Hills are a historically and religiously significant hill range located near Kahalgaon and Kursela of Bihar, India. The area is renowned for its ancient temples, rock-cut caves, and association with Hindu mythology and pilgrimage traditions.

== Geography and location ==
The Bateshwar Hills are situated approximately 10 km from Kahalgaon and about 6 km from Kursela, on the banks of the Ganges River, close to the confluence with the Kosi River. In this region, the Ganga flows northward, a phenomenon called Uttarvahini Ganga, considered highly auspicious.

The hills are part of the Rajmahal volcanic system, composed mainly of basaltic rocks.

== History ==
Local legends state that the Vedic sage Brahmarshi Vashishtha performed penance at Bateshwar, establishing a Shivlinga. The main temple, Bateshwar Nath Mahadev, was built around the 7th century and renovated during the 12th century by rulers of the Sena dynasty.

The site is sometimes called Gupta Kashi ("Hidden Kashi") due to its spiritual importance.

== Architecture ==
The Bateshwar Nath Temple is dedicated to Shiva and houses eleven Shivlings, referred to as Ekadash Mahadev. There is also a rare idol of Ardhanarishwara, symbolizing the combined form of Shiva and Parvati.

Nearby, ancient rock-cut caves like Patalpuri are found, containing sculptures and inscriptions dating back to the Pala and Sena periods.

== Religious significance ==
Bateshwar Hills are a major pilgrimage site, especially during the Hindu month of Shravan (July–August), attracting thousands of devotees. Devotees perform Jalabhishek rituals, offering holy water from the Ganges to the Shivlings.

The proximity of Bateshwar to Vikramashila Mahavihara, an ancient Buddhist monastic university, highlights the syncretic spiritual traditions of the region.

== Accessibility ==
The Bateshwar Hills can be reached by road via Kahalgaon which have railway stations on the Sahibganj Loop Line. The nearest airport is Jay Prakash Narayan Airport in Patna, approximately 285 km away.

To reach the temples, visitors must ascend around 100 rock-cut steps carved into the hillside.

== Conservation ==
The Archaeological Survey of India (ASI) has identified Bateshwar Hills as a site of archaeological and religious importance, with preservation efforts underway.

Local authorities and NGOs have also taken steps to improve visitor amenities and preserve the natural environment.

== See also ==
- Vikramashila Mahavihara
- Uttarvahini Ganga
- Kahalgaon
- Kursela
- Rajmahal Hills
