= Vikramshila Gangetic Dolphin Sanctuary =

Dolphin sanctuary in Bhagalpur, India

- Notified - 07th August, 1991
- IUCN category IV (habitat/species management area)
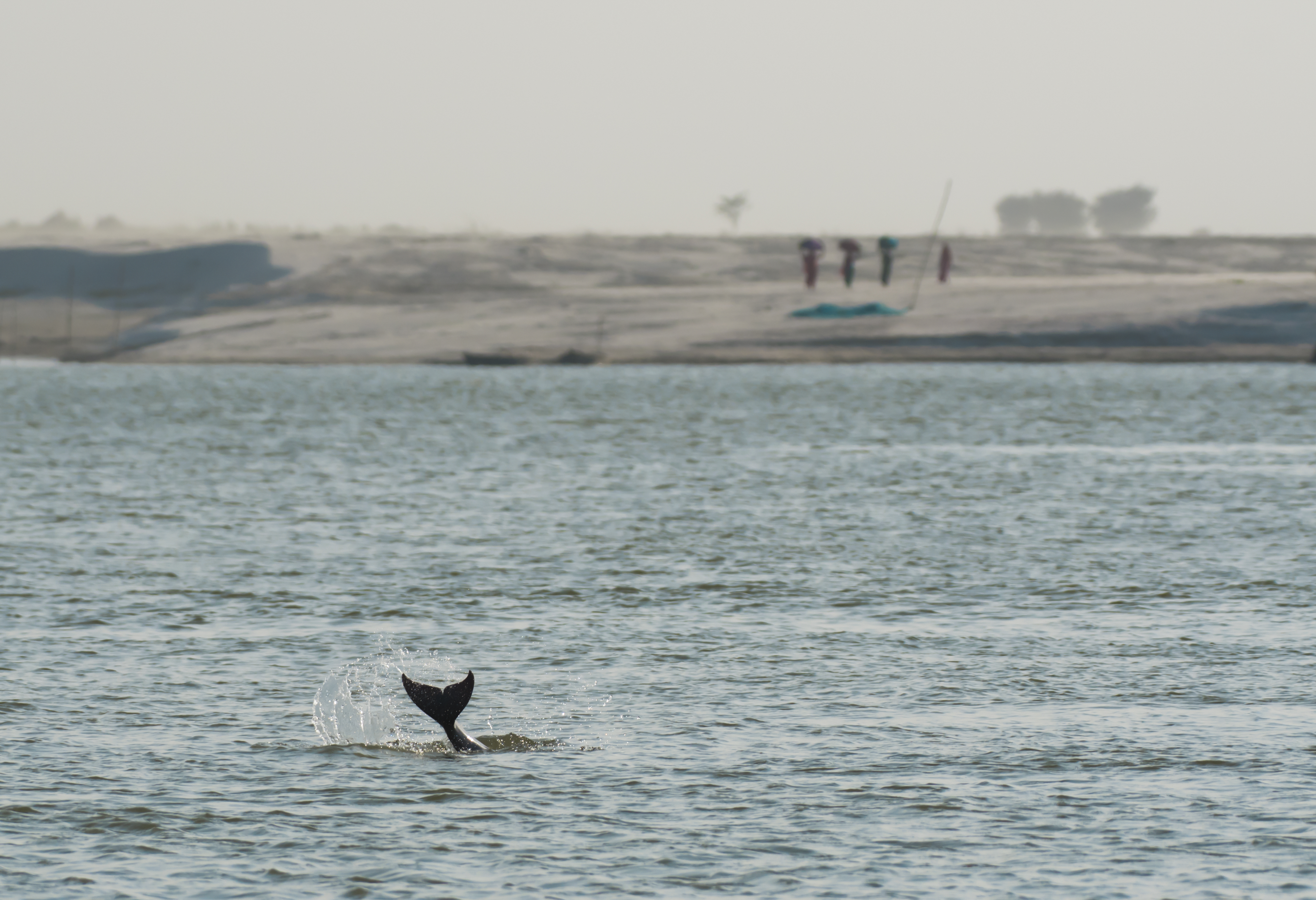
- Gangetic Dolphin in VGDS

- Location within Bihar Location within India
- Interactive map of Vikramshila Gangetic Dolphin Sanctuary
- Location: Sultanganj to Kahalgaon Bihar, India
- Nearest city: Bhagalpur
- Coordinates: 25°16′10.6″N 87°01′34.7″E
- Established: 1991
- Governing body: Department of Environment, Forest and Climate Change, Bihar

Vikramshila Gangetic Dolphin Sanctuary is located in Bhagalpur District of Bihar, India. The sanctuary is a 60 kilometers stretch of the Ganges River from Sultanganj to Kahalgaon in Bhagalpur district. notified as Vikramshila Gangetic Dolphin Sanctuary in 1991, it is the protected area for the endangered Gangetic dolphins in Asia. Once found in abundance, only a few hundred remain, of which half are found here.

The Gangetic dolphin have been declared as the national aquatic animal of India. This decision was taken in the first meeting of the National Ganga River Basin Authority (NGRBA) chaired by Prime Minister Dr. Manmohan Singh on 5 October 2009.

== Introduction ==
The Vikramshila Gangetic Dolphin Sanctuary (VGDS) has been notified for the protection and conservation of Gangetic dolphin in the 60 km stretch of the Ganga river from Sultanganj to Kahalgaon under the provisions of Wildlife (Protection), Act 1972. Being a riverine habitat, its boundary and expanse keep on changing due to changing geomorphology of the Ganga river. The sanctuary has been named after the famous archaeological remains of Vikramshila University that was once a famous center of Buddhist learning across the world along with Nalanda during the Pala dynasty. Sultanganj, famous as an important religious centre in the Bihar, Bhagalpur famous as silk city and Kahalgaon known for the super thermal power plant of NTPC are important towns along the notified stretch of the sanctuary.

Sultanganj is a city and a notified area in Bhagalpur district, situated on the south bank of Ganga River, approximately 25 kilometers west of Bhagalpur city. Bhagalpur is a city with a Municipal Corporation situated on the southern bank of the Ganga. It is the third largest city in Bihar and the largest city in eastern Bihar. It is one of the major educational and commercial cities of this region. Area of the city is 110 square kilometers. Kahalgaon (formerly known as Colgong during British rule) is a town and a municipality in Bhagalpur district. It is located close to the archaeological remains of Vikramshila University and at the eastern end of the sanctuary bordering the state of Jharkhand. The Kahalgaon Super Thermal Power Plant, a unit of National Thermal Power Corporation is located near the town.

== Attraction ==
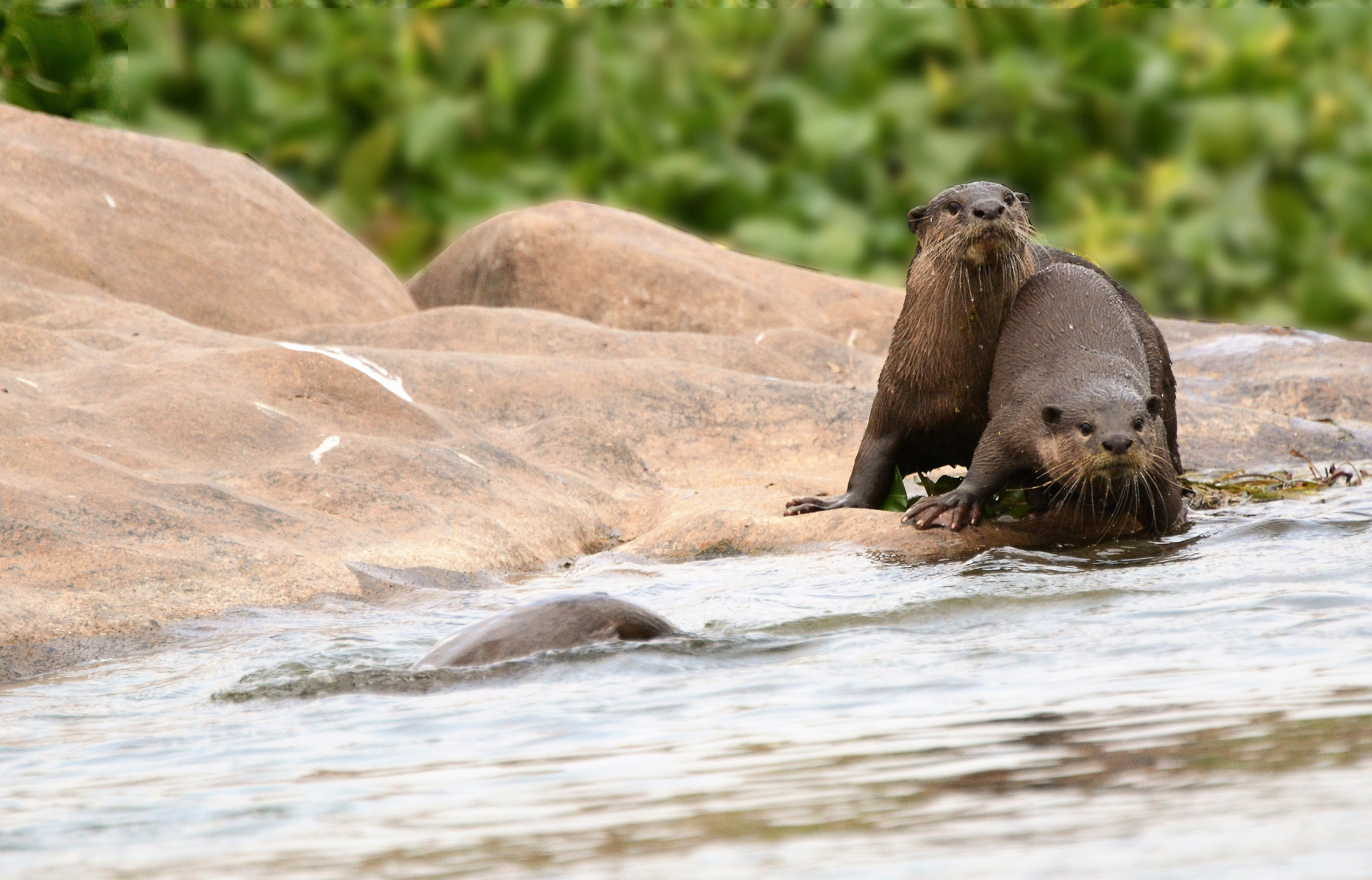
Smooth-coated otter

Major attractions are the Ganges river dolphins (known as Soons by Locals) which are classified as endangered on the 2022 IUCN Red List of Threatened Species, included in Schedule-I of the Indian Wildlife Protection Act, 1972 and Appendix 2 of Convention of Migratory Species.

The sanctuary also contains rich diversity of other threatened aquatic wildlife, including the Indian smooth-coated otter (Lutrogale perspicillata), gharial (Gavialis gangeticus), a variety of freshwater turtles, and 135 species of waterfowl.

== Turtle Diversity ==
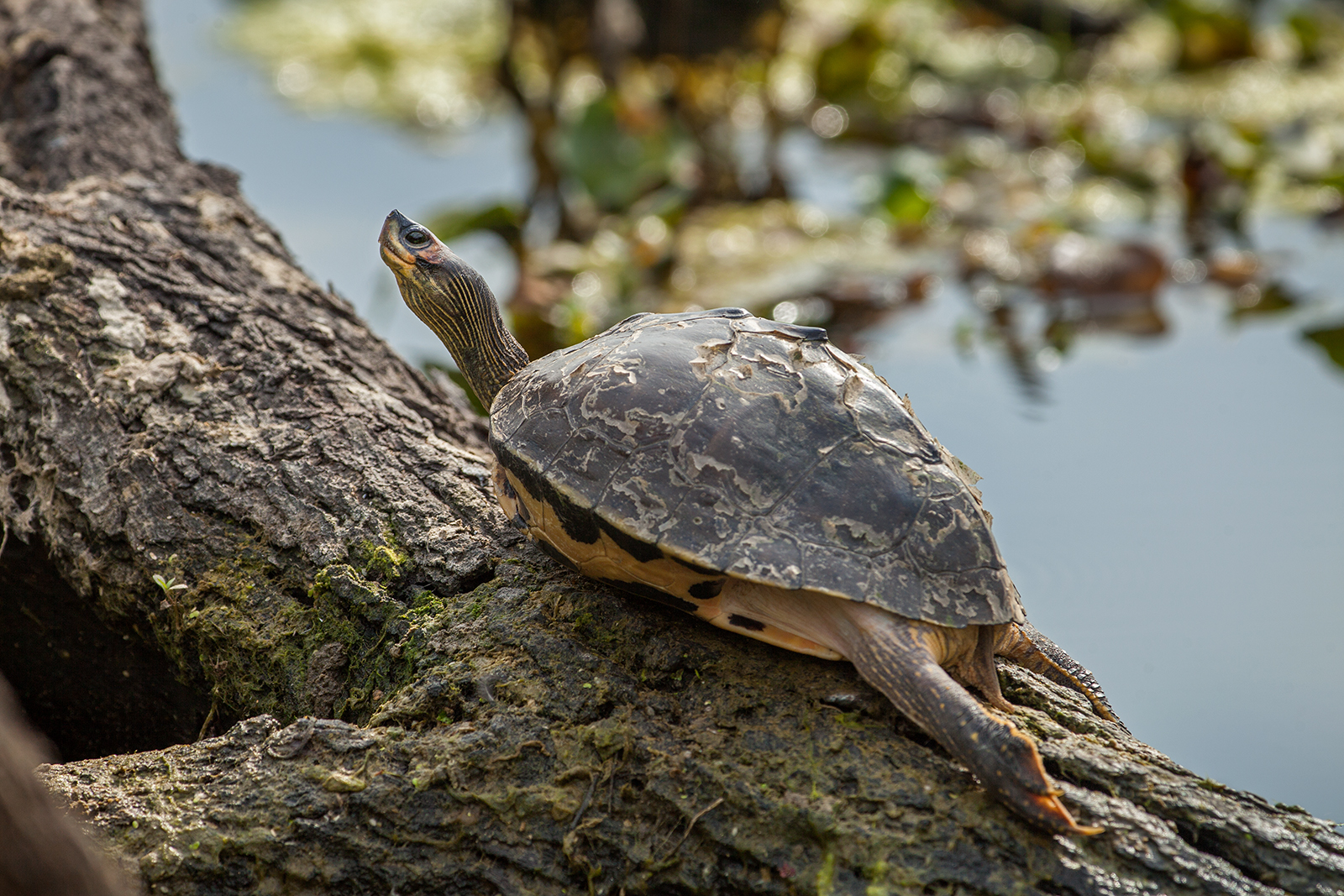
Pangshura tecta

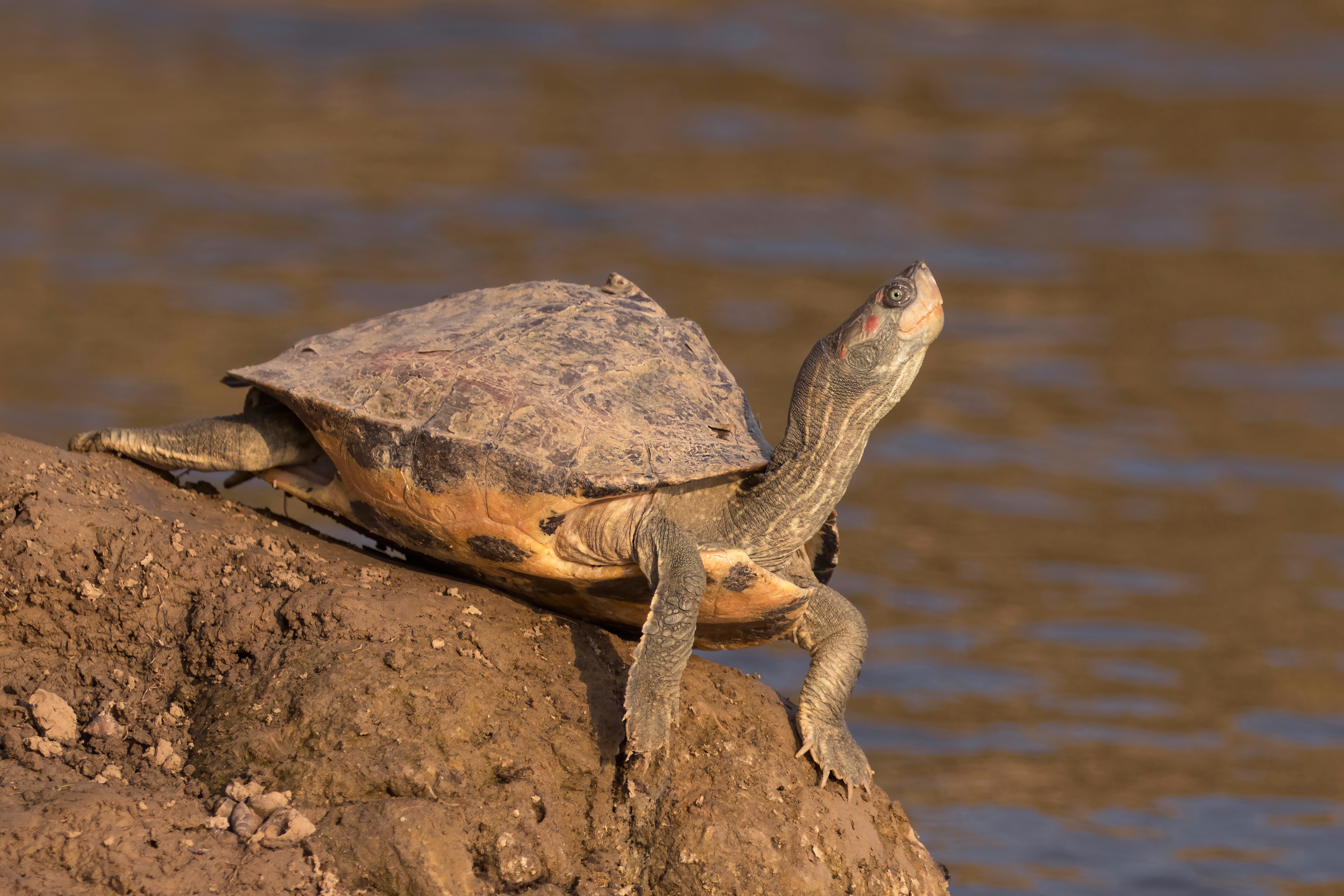
Pangshura tentoria

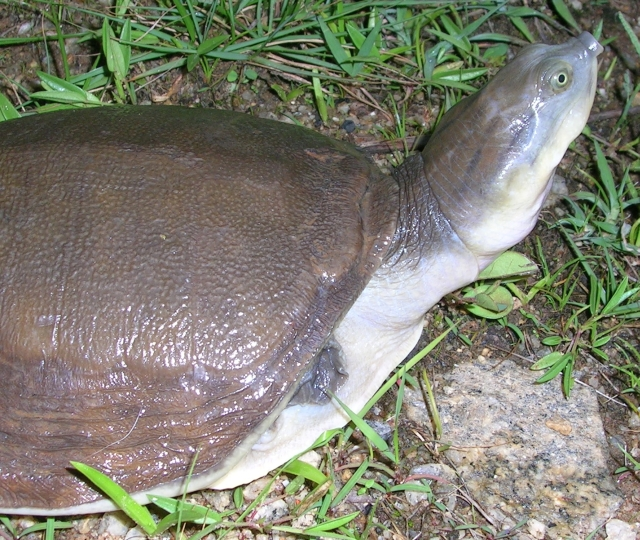
Lissemys punctata

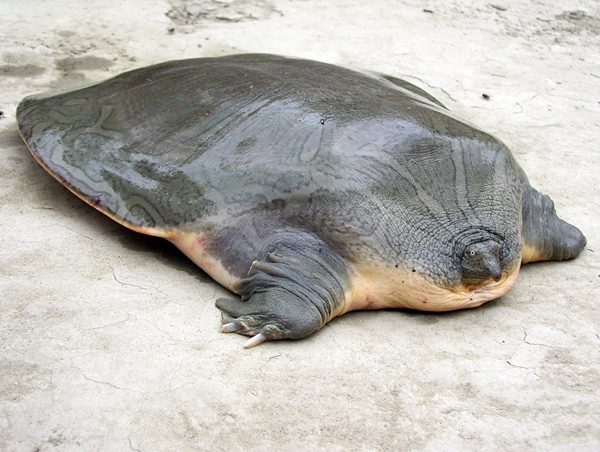
Chitra indica

Turtle are the key animals for cleaning the water which leads to cleaner and healthy water for all the flora and fauna of the river Ganga. There are several species of turtles of conservation importance such as:

- Nilsonia gangetica – commonly known as Indian softshell turtle
- Nilsonia hurum – commonly known as Indian peacock softshell turtle
- Pangshura tecta – commonly known as Indian roofed turtle
- Pangshura tentoria – commonly known as Indian tent turtle
- Lissemys punctata – commonly known as Indian flapshell turtle
- Chitra indica – commonly known as Indian narrow-headed softshell turtle

== Avifauna ==
Based on surveys done by researchers and experts, there are approximately 198 bird species recorded in the sanctuary area. Of these recorded species, several species are threatened and near threatened (Critically endangered-1, Endangered-2, Vulnerable-6 and near threatened-13). Fauna from different families such as Accipitridae, Alaudidae, Alcedinidae, Anatidae, Ardeidae, Charadriidae, Ciconiidae, Hirundinidae, Laridae, Motacillidae, Scolopacidae, Threskiornithidae could be seen here.

Accipitridae (a family of small to large birds with strongly hooked bills and variable morphology based on diet, which feed on a range of prey items from insects to medium-sized mammals, with a number feeding on carrion and a few feeding on fruit) includes black kite, black-winged kite, shikra, crested serpent eagle, species like eastern imperial eagle, greater spotted eagle, Indian spotted eagle, Pallas's fish eagle, declared as Vulnerable as per IUCN Red List could also be spotted here. Osprey and Peregrine falcon are also sighted in this area.

== Fish abundance and diversity ==
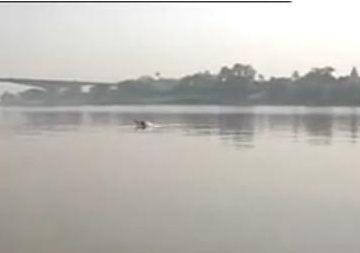
Gangetic dolphin At Vikramshila Setu

Fishes are an important food for Gangetic dolphin, and hence a critical determinant of dolphin presence. Fishes of small sizes serve as dolphin's food. Some of the fish species recorded in VGDS are:

- Helicopter catfish – locally known as Barwari or Boyari (Wallago attu)
- Indian river shad – locally known as Suhiya (Salmostoma bacalia)
- Indian patasi – locally known as Patasi or Potasi (Pseudeutropius atherinoides)
- Gangetic ailia – locally known as Patanga or Kajuli (Ailia coila)
- Bagrid catfish – locally known as Ayre (Sperata aor)
- Coitor croaker (Johnius coitor), Mrigal (Cirrhinus mrigala)
- Short-hairfin anchovy (Setipinna brevifilis) and
- Gangetic Mystus – locally known as Kavasi or Palwa (Mystus cavasius).

== Waterfowl abundance and diversity ==
There are approximately 198 species of birds identified by the experts and researchers. Several species are threatened and near threatened (critically endangered-1, endangered-2, vulnerable-6 and near threatened-13).

== Visiting ==
The best time to visit is October and June. Bhagalpur Junction railway station serves as the nearest railhead. Area between Sultanganj in west of Bhagalpur to Kahalgaon in east of Bhagalpur. Notably at Barari Ghat, where the Vikramshila Setu starts. The Manik Sarkar ghat in monsoon season from July to mid-September provides one of the best sighting of this species.

== Threats ==
- Multiple dams and barriers disrupting free movement of the dolphins.
- Pollution by fertilisers, pesticides and industrial and domestic effluents, which are responsible for the death of many fish and are likely to have a negative effect on dolphin population.
- Killing of the animals for their meat or oil (used as catfish bait), and accidental entanglement in fishing nets.

== Conservation ==
There are various conservation works going on the sanctuary area. Noted works are:

- The Vikramshila Biodiversity Research and Education Centre (VBREC), led by Dr. Sunil Chaudhary, together with the Whale and Dolphin Conservation Society (WDCS), the Environmental Biology Laboratory of Patna University, and T.M. Bhagalpur University, has initiated a project to improve the conservation value of Vikramshila Gangetic Dolphin Sanctuary.
- Aaranyak, a registered conservation NGO working in North East India since 1989, has initiated a project entitled "Conservation of Gangetic dolphin in Brahmaputra river system, India" in collaboration with Dibrugarh University (Assam). The project aims to evaluate the conservation status of the Ganges river dolphin throughout the entire Brahmaputra river system by carrying out research into the species' population status, distribution, habitat preferences and threats.
- WWF-India also had started the Dolphin Conservation Programme to conserve the habitat of the Ganges river dolphin and secure a future for the endangered species.
- Forest Guards, Forester and other official of Bhagalpur Forest Division, Bhagalpur make sure of no illegal nets to be there in the sanctuary area. Even with limited support and manpower, Regular patrolling and seizure of illegal nets is carried out.

== See also ==
- Ganga Prasad Lake
- Jagatpur Lake
- Vikramshila
