= BASR =

BASR may refer to:

- Bureau of Applied Social Research, American social research institute
- British Association for the Study of Religions
- Bateshwar Halt railway station, station code "BASR"
- BASR Clothing, Faith based apparel.
