= Bridges in Bihar =

The state of Bihar has a number of bridges, extending from few metres to a few kilometres. The history of long bridges goes back to the British Empire when the site for the Koilwar bridge (Abdul Bari bridge) was surveyed in 1851. Since then a number of small and large bridges have crept up. Some are even largest of their kind. Mahatma Gandhi Setu, joining Patna and Hajipur was India's longest river bridge from 1982 to 2017.

== Notable bridges ==
=== Mahatma Gandhi Setu ===
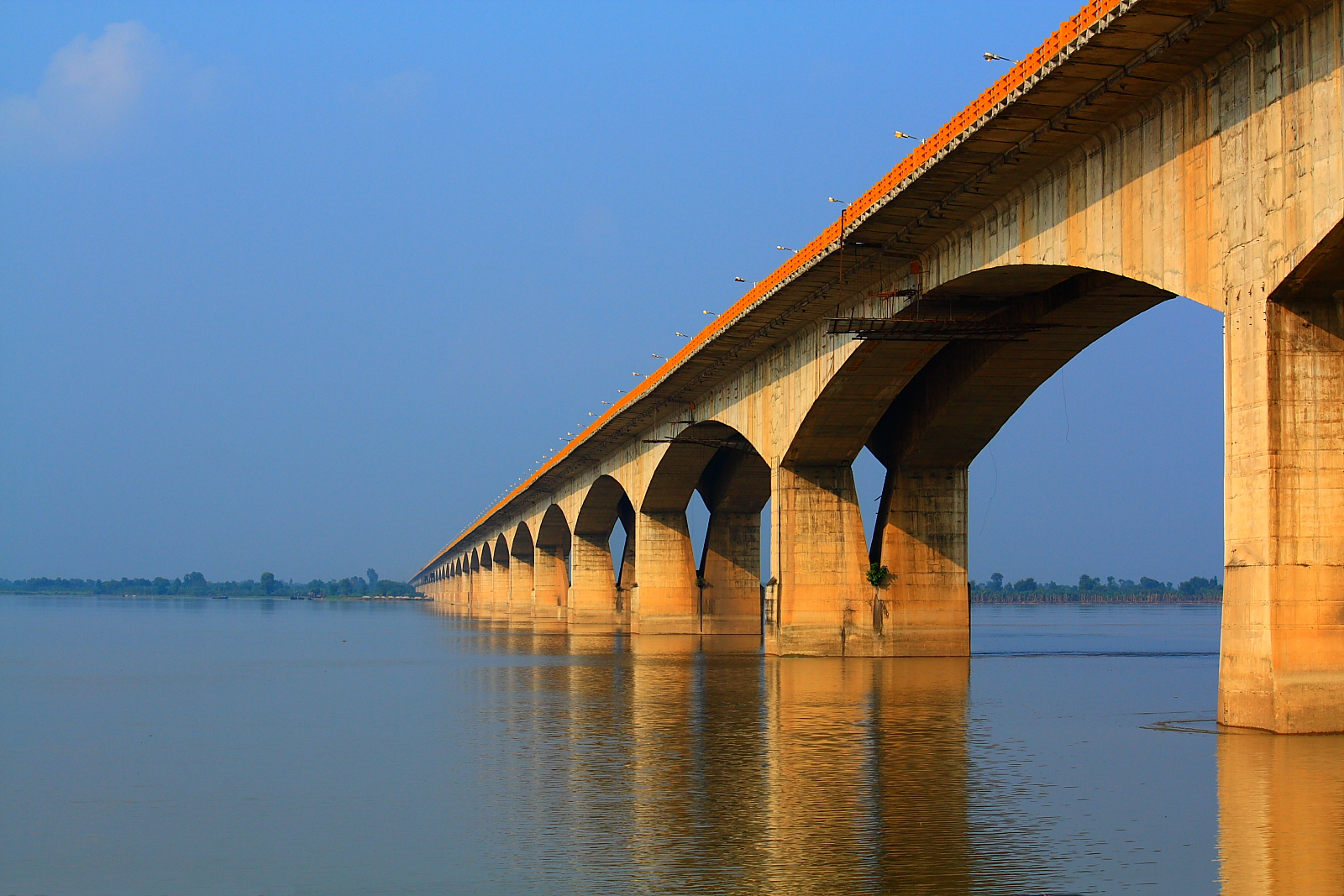
Gandhi Setu Bridge in Patna, India

Also called Gandhi Setu or Ganga Setu is a bridge over the river Ganges connecting Patna in the south to Hajipur in the north of Bihar. Its length is 5,575 metres (18,291 ft) and it is one of the longest river bridges in India. It was inaugurated in May 1982 by the then Prime Minister, Indira Gandhi. The bridge was approved by the Central Government in 1969 and built by Gammon India Limited over a period of ten years, from 1972 to 1982. It was built to connect North Bihar with the rest of Bihar. Before this bridge was constructed, Rajendra Setu, opened in 1959, was the only link to North Bihar. Since then, the Vikramshila Setu has also been built across the Ganges. Two more rail-cum-road bridges are currently under construction, between Digha and Sonepur and at Munger.

A parallel Bridge is planned on Ganga, DPR Initiated

=== Koilwar Bridge ===
Koilwar Bridge, now named Abdul Bari Bridge, at Koilwar spans the River Sone. The bridge has been named after Professor Abdul Bari, academic and social reformer. The Koilwar Bridge (known as Sone Bridge when it was built) is amongst the older of the longer bridges in this subcontinent. Although construction started in 1856, it was disrupted by uprisings in 1857 and completed in 1862. It was inaugurated by the Viceroy Lord Elgin, who said, "... this magnificent bridge was exceeded in magnitude by only one bridge in the world". The 4,726 feet (1,440 m) bridge was designed by James Meadows Rendel and Sir Matthew Digby Wyatt. It remained the longest bridge in the Indian subcontinent till was overtaken by the Upper Sone Bridge in 1900. The steel rail-road bridge is shown in the film Gandhi. A two lane road (Old NH 30) runs just under the double rail tracks. Sand mining near the pillars of this old bridge has created structural problems recently.

=== Rajendra Setu ===
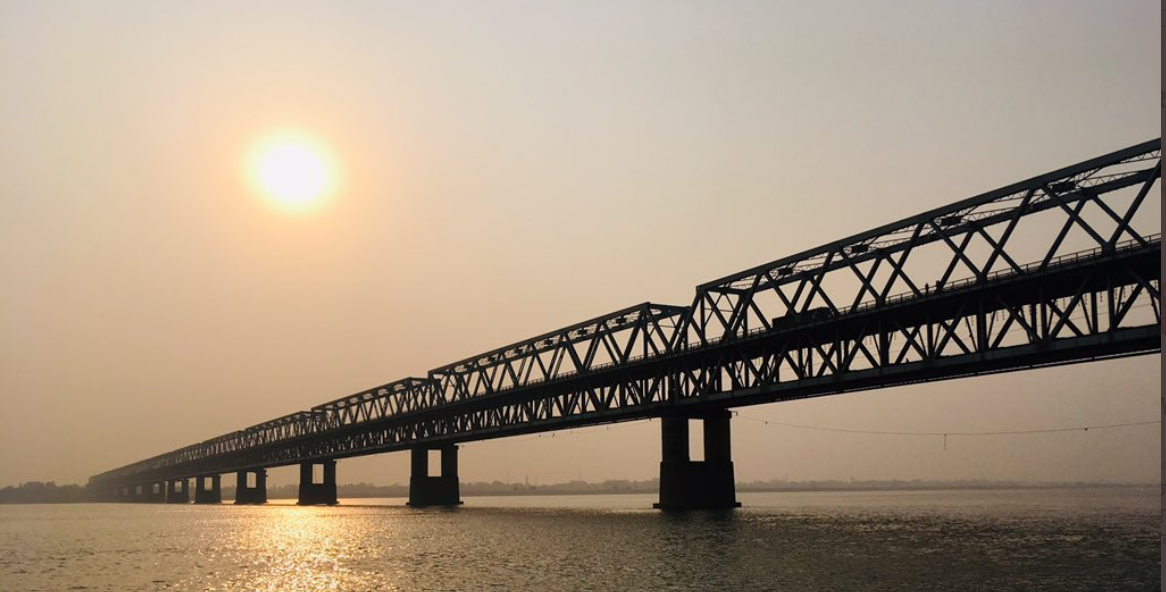
Rajendra Setu

Rajendra Setu across the Ganges was the first bridge to link North Bihar and South Bihar. It was the first rail-cum-road bridge in independent India .The foundation stone for the rail-cum-road bridge between Mokama in Patna district and Simaria in Begusarai district was laid by Dr. Rajendra Prasad, the first President of India and inaugurated by Pt Jawaharlal Nehru and Shri Krishna Sinha, the first prime minister of India and first chief minister of Bihar respectively. It is about 2 kilometres (1.2 mi) long and carries a two lane road and a single line railway track. It was opened in 1959. A six-lane road bridge, carrying NH 31, parallel to the existing rail and road bridge, and a two line railway bridge are under construction and expected to be completed in early 2024.

=== Nehru Setu ===
Nehru Setu (earlier referred to as the Upper Son Bridge), across the Son River, between Dehri-on-Son and Son Nagar, in Bihar, is the second longest railway bridge in India, after Vembanad Rail Bridge in Kerala. However, the latter is meant only for goods traffic. Jawahar Setu, the road bridge carrying NH 2 and running parallel to the Nehru Setu, was constructed in 1963–65. The Government of Bihar sanctioned in 2008, a bridge across the Son River connecting Arwal and Sahar in Bojpur district. The Koilwar bridge preceded the Nehru Setu and was opened in 1862. An anicut was constructed across the Son, a little upstream of the present Nehru Setu and Jawahar Setu, in 1873–74. The Indrapuri Barrage was constructed, 8 km upstream, and commissioned in 1968.

=== Jay Prakash Setu (JP Setu) ===
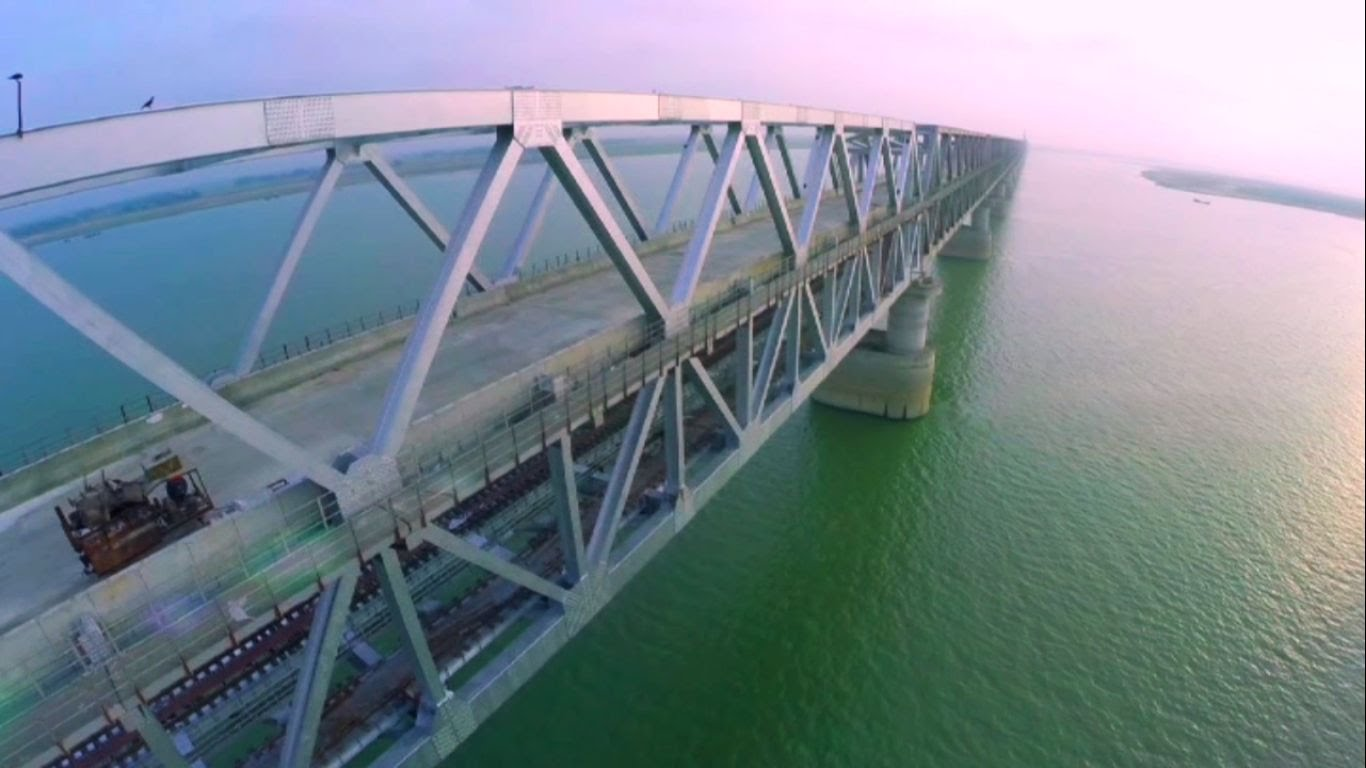
Digha–Sonpur Bridge

Digha–Sonpur bridge, is a K-truss Bridge across river Ganges, connecting Digha Ghat in Patna and Pahleja Ghat in Sonpur. The bridge was completed in August 2015. The bridge provides easy Roadway and Railway link between Northern and Southern parts of Bihar.

Earlier, Rajendra Setu was the only bridge that carries railway tracks across the Ganges in the state of Bihar which was opened in 1959. Initially sanctioned as a rail bridge, the Ganga Rail Bridge project was converted to a rail-cum-road bridge in 2006. Total cost of the project was put at ₹13,890 million, out of which ₹8,350 million was for the rail part, and ₹5,540 million was for the road part. It was expected to be completed in five years. The 4,556 metres (14,948 ft) bridge is amongst the longer bridges in India. The total length of construction, including approaches, is 20 km. It is a K-truss bridge.

=== Vikramshila Setu ===
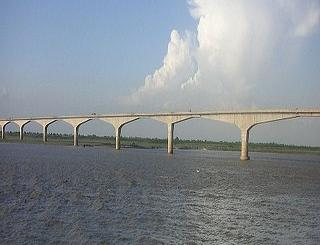
Vikramshila Setu

Vikramshila Setu is a bridge across the Ganges, near Bhagalpur named after Vikramashila Mahavihara which was established by King Dharmapala (783 to 820 AD). Vikramshila Setu is 3rd longest bridge in India and 118 rank in world longest bridge in world. The 4.7-kilometre-long (2.9 mi) bridge serves as a link between NH 80 and NH 31 running on the opposite sides of the Ganges. It runs from Barari Ghat on the Bhagalpur side on the south bank of the Ganges to Naugachia on the north bank. It also connects Bhagalpur to Purnia and Katihar. This has reduced considerably the road travel distance between Bhagalpur , Naugachia and places across the Ganges.

=== Shri Krishna Setu ===
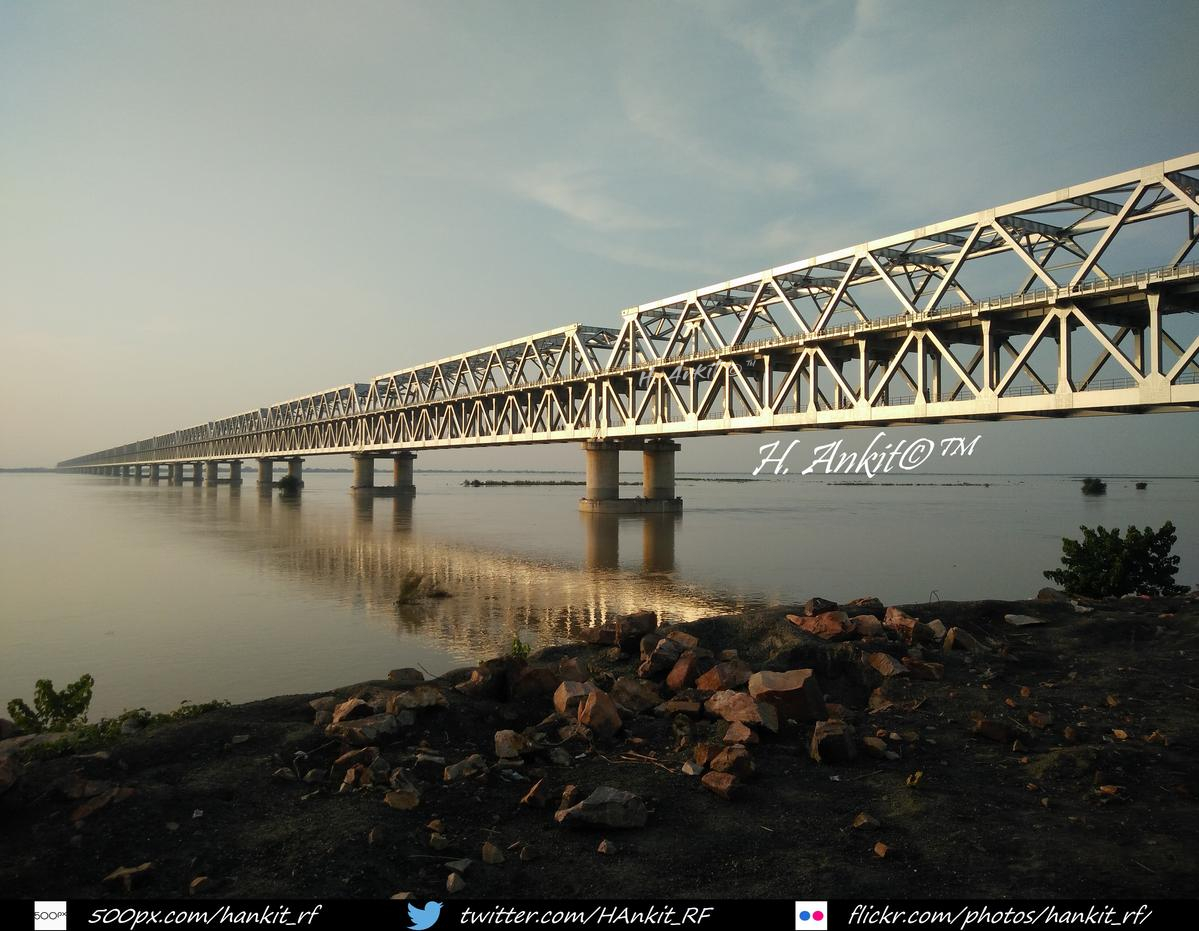
Shri Krishna Setu

Shri Krishna Setu ( Munger Ganga Bridge) is a rail-cum-road bridge under construction across the Ganges, at Munger. The bridge will connect Munger-Jamalpur twin cities to various districts of North Bihar. The 3.19-kilometre-long (1.98 mi) bridge costing Rs. 9,300 million is located 55 km downstream of the Rajendra Setu near Mokama and 68 km upstream of the Vikramshila Setu at Bhagalpur. The bridge will form a link between NH 80 on the southern side of the Ganges and NH 31 on the northern side of the Ganges. It will also help to connect Jamalpur Junction on the Sahibganj Loop line of Eastern Railway to Sahebpur Kamal Junction on the Barauni-Katihar section of East Central Railway. The Bridge will connect districts of Begusarai and Khagaria to the Divisional headquarters Munger city. Construction work on the bridge was inaugurated by Atal Bihari Vajpayee, Prime Minister, through video conference system in 2002.

=== Bakhtiyarpur-Tajpur Bridge ===
The Bakhtiyarpur-Tajpur Bridge currently under construction, will span the river Ganges, connecting Bakhtiyarpur in Patna and Tajpur in Samastipur. Upon completion, the bridge would provide easy Roadway link between Northern and Southern parts of Bihar. Chief minister of Bihar Shri Nitish Kumar laid the foundation stone for construction of the 5.575-kilometre-long (3.464 mi) bridge in June 2011. Upon completion, the bridge will decongest the load on Mahatma Gandhi Setu and also reduce the traffic in the capital city of Patna. A bridge has been planned across the Ganges to connect Arrah and Chhapra. A road bridge parallel to the existing rail and road bridge, Rajendra Setu, has also been planned. The bridge would be 5.575 km bridge constructed at PPP mode across river Ganga that will connect Bakhtiyarpur in Patna district on NH 31 and Tajpur in Samastipur district on NH 28. The bridge will also require construction of altogether 45.393 km stretch of approach roads on both ends of the bridge. The total cost of the project is estimated at Rs 1602.74 crore out of which Rs 100 crores will be spent on acquiring land. At first, Rs 917.74 crore is to be invested by Navayuga Engineering Company Limited (NECL) as viability gap fund on PPP basis. Rs 277.50 crore are to be invested by the Centre and Rs 307.50 crore by the state government. The Bihar government would also bear the expenses incurred on acquiring land. NECL, a Hyderabad base firm was selected through competitive bidding.

=== Aguani Ghat Bridge ===
This cable stayed bridge connects Aguwani Ghat (Khagaria District) and Sultanganj (Bhagalpur District) by crossing river Ganga in the State of Bihar.

The project length comprises an approach road of 25 km and a bridge with a length of 3.160 km including a cable stayed span of 550m (150m+250m+150m). After completion, the travelling distance between Darbhanga division and Kosi division will be reduced by 50 km and the distance between Munger and Khagaria would be reduced to 35 km which will result in reduction in overall travel time, reducing traffic congestion, providing smooth connectivity and an alternative route to Vikramshila Setu. The proposed bridge is located at a distance of around 200 km from Patna.

The project involves the construction of a 3.16 km four-lane bridge. It includes the construction of pedestrian ways, medians and supporting walls, the installation of lighting system, safety and security systems, and the laying of street lines.

On 10 March 2014 tenders for construction contract were issued, with a submission deadline of 4 April 2014. SP Singla Constructions Pvt. Ltd has been appointed as construction contractor for the project. Rodic Consultants Pvt Ltd has been appointed as consultant and Cube Engitech Consultant Pvt Ltd as design consultant. Construction began on 9 March 2015 and are expected to be completed by November 2019.

On 4 June 2023 the Aguani Ghat experienced a bridge collapse while undergoing repairs. Nobody was reported injured.

=== Aguwani Sultanganj Ganga Bridge ===
The Aguwani Sultanganj Ganga Bridge is an under-construction bridge over the Ganga River in Bihar, India. It was supposed to connect Khagaria district with Bhagalpur. On the June 4, 2023, the bridge collapsed for the second time. The first collapse happened on 29 April 2022. No casualties were reported in either incident.

The bridge was being constructed by the Bihar State Road Construction Corporation (BSRCC). The cost of the project was estimated to be ₹1,717 crore (US$208 million).

The cause of the bridge collapses is still under investigation. However, some experts have suggested that the design of the bridge may have been flawed. Others have said that the construction may have been shoddy.

The collapse of the Aguwani Sultanganj Ganga Bridge has raised concerns about the safety of other under-construction bridges in India. The Indian government has ordered a review of all such bridges.

This incident has also caused economic and social disruption. The bridge was supposed to help boost trade and tourism in the region, while its collapse has also made it more difficult for people to travel between Khagaria and Bhagalpur.

The government has said that it will rebuild the bridge. However, it is not clear when the bridge will be completed.

== Solutions ==
It is not that the government is not working in the direction, but the steps taken are still a fraction of what is needed. Bihar Government is planning to build two Pontoon bridges in parallel to Ganga Setu, in order to ease traffic on Ganga Setu.

== See also ==
- List of longest bridges in the world
- List of longest bridges above water in India
