= Bateshwar Sthan =

Ancient site related Lord Shiva and Brahmarshi Vashishtha

Coordinates: 25.328°N 87.260°E

- बटेश्वर स्थान (Sanskrit)
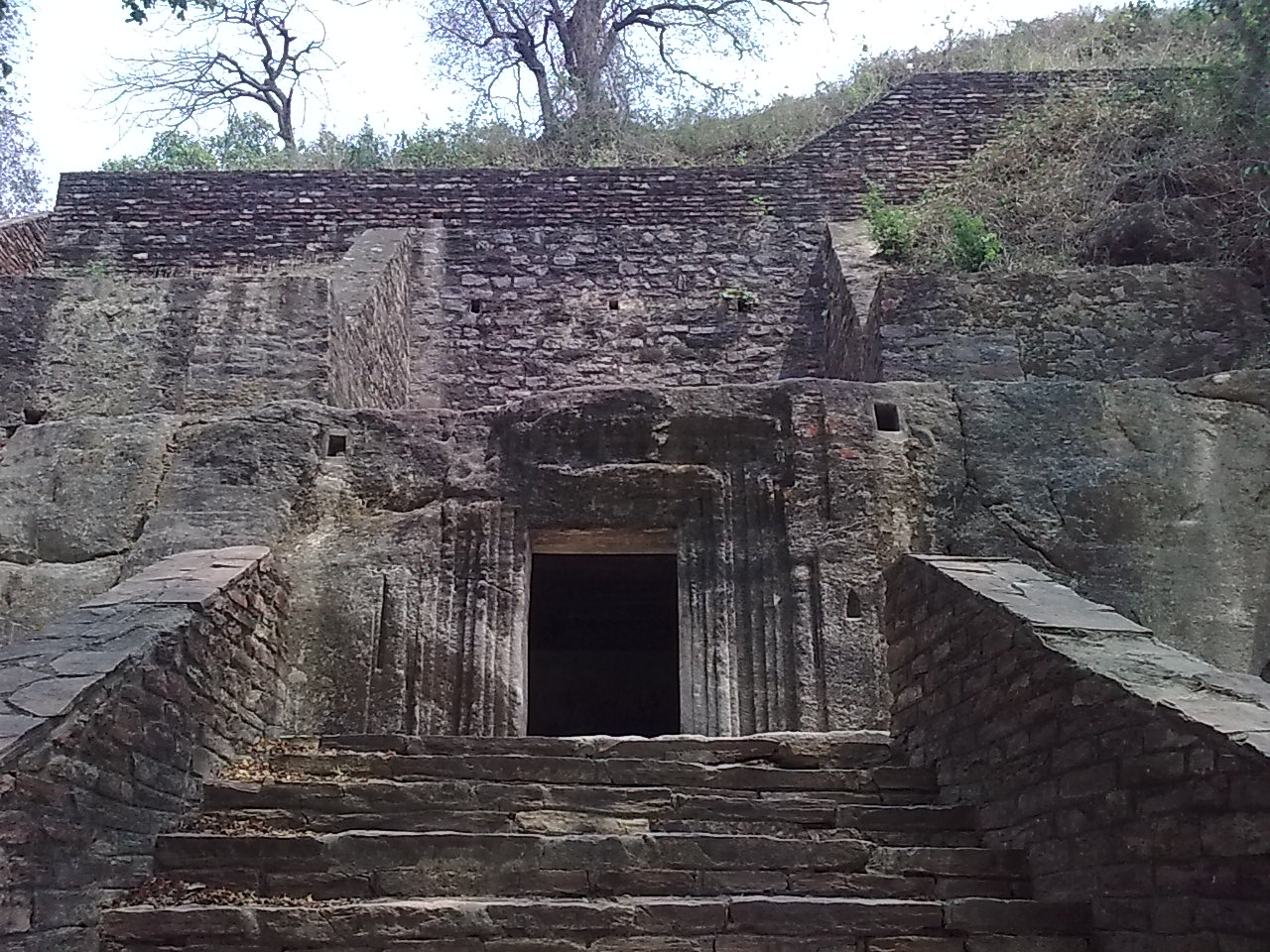
- Entrance of the cave at Bateshwar Sthan
- Interactive map of Bateshwar Sthan
- Location: Kahalgaon, Bhagalpur district, Bihar
- Region: Anga

Site notes
- Architectural style: Hinduism

Bateshwar Sthan ( Sanskrit: बटेश्वर स्थान ) is an ancient site related to the Vedic sage Brahmarshi Vashishtha at Kahalgaon in Bhagalpur district of Bihar, India. It is believed as the Taposthali ( penance place ) of the sage Vashishtha where he established Shivlinga known as Bateshwar Nath Mahadeva. According to Puranas, the sage Vashistha was the Kulguru (royal teacher) of the King Nimi in the Videha Kingdom later also called as Mithila Kingdom.

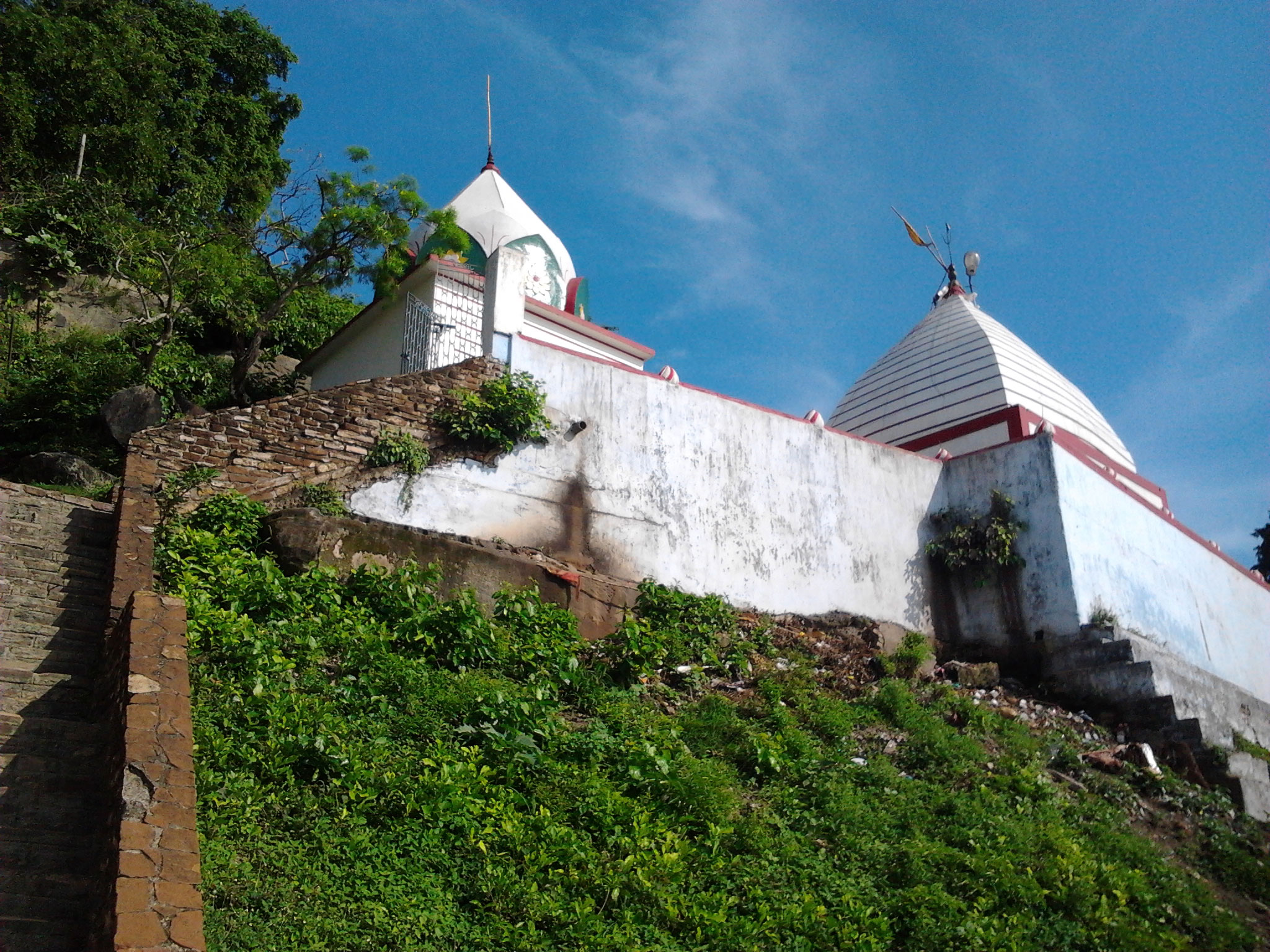
View of the temples of Lord Shiva and Goddess Kali at Bateshwar Sthan

== Etymology ==
The temple was named after the sage Vashishtha. Earlier this temple was known as Bashishtheshvar ( Vashishtheshwar ) Mahadev, which later came to be known as Bateshwar Mahadev. Thus the place is called as Bateshwar Sthan.

== Description ==
It is said that Sage Vasishtha performed his penance here and worshiped Shiva there. There is a temple of Lord Shiva known as Baba Bateshwar Nath Mahadev Mandir in the campus of Bateshwar Sthan. The temple is at foothills of Bateshwar mountain on the bank of the north flowing Ganga located ten kilometres away from Kahalgaon. This is also the confluence point of the Ganga and Kosi rivers. According to legend, it is said that in Puranas it is mentioned that Kahalgaon's Bateshwar Sthan was planned to make Kashi Dham but due to lack of some land it remained incomplete in the making of Kashi Dham. According to legendary story, after the marriage of Shiva and Goddess Parvati, they were living at Kailash. But Goddess Parvati was not feeling comfortable there because Kailash was in the territory of Parvatraj Himalaya. It is said Shiva realised it and he wished to fulfill by choosing another destination for living. Devashree Narada and Vishvakarma was assigned to find piece of land equal to Kailash. For this, the condition was that the entire plot of land should be situated on the bank of Ganga river where Ganga flows northwards ( Uttarvahini Ganga ) and that place should also be sacred. Then Devashree Narada and Vishvakarma searched three places, they were Bateshwar Sthan of Kahalgaon, Chitabhumi of Devgarh in Jharkhand, and Varanasi of Uttar Pradesh. Due to the presence of Shaktipeeth at Chitabhumi, this place was not considered suitable for the residence of both of them. Similarly there was a shortcoming with Bateshwar Sthan situated near Kahalgaon, this land was a bit less than the size of Kailash. After that Varanasi was finally selected as Kashi of Shiva and Goddess Parvati. According to Puranas, Bateshwar Sthan is also known as Gupta Kashi. It is believed that The Buddha also stayed here for three months to do meditation during the Varshavasa period.

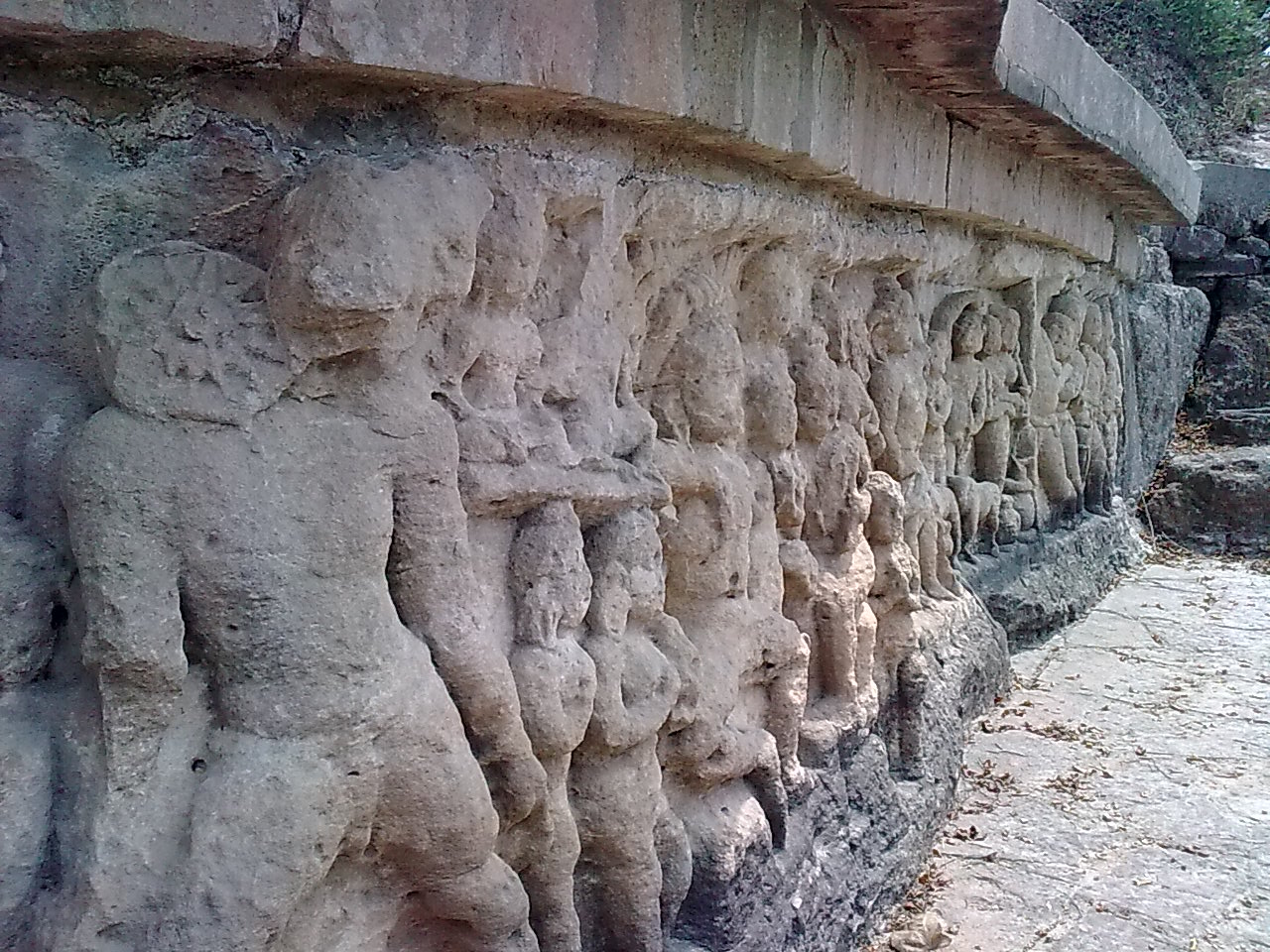
Ancient rock sculptures

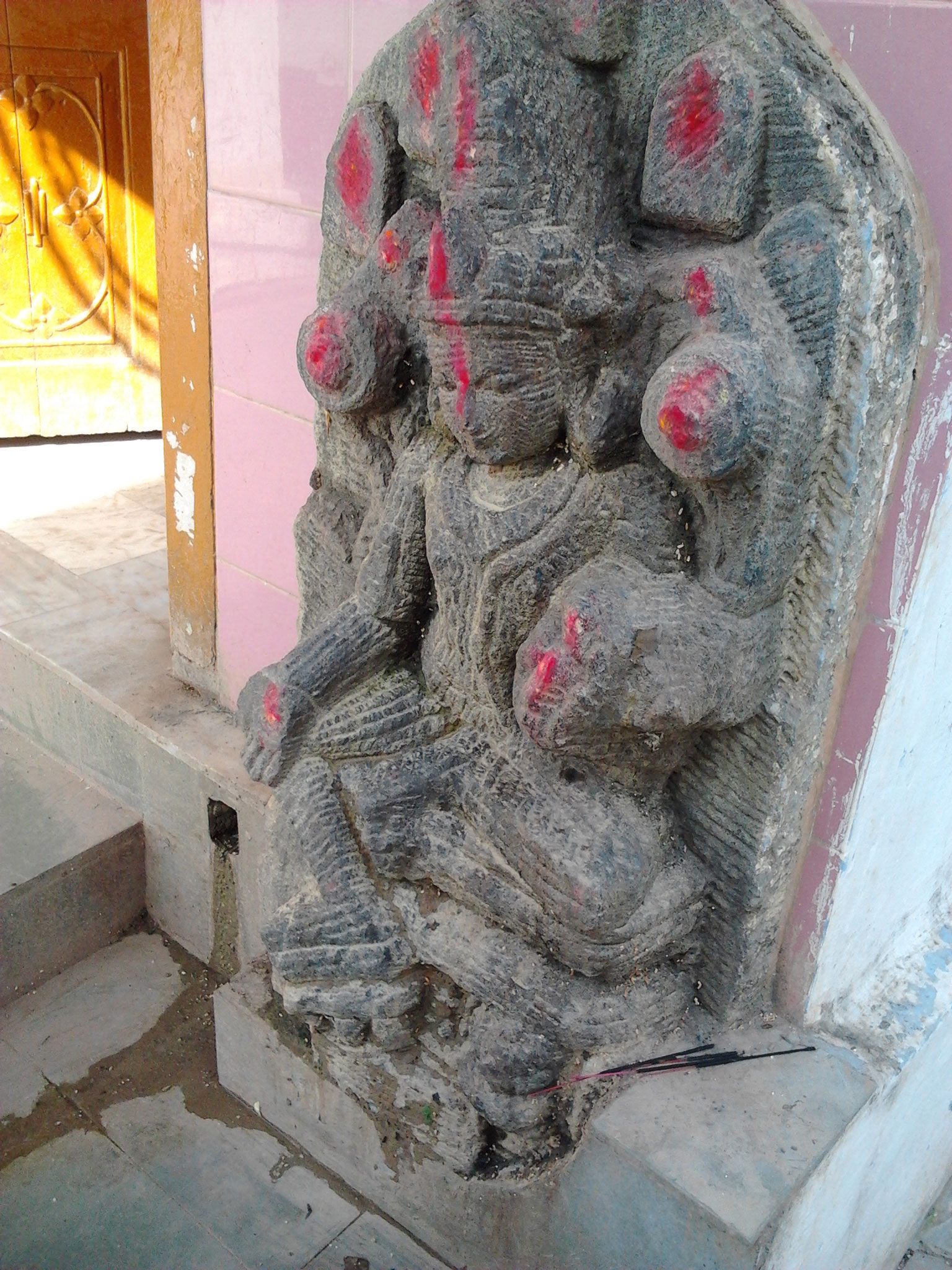
Ancient Idol at Bateshwar Sthan

There is a temple of Maa Kali just opposite of the Bateshwar Nath Mahadev Mandir. It is said that in ancient times, it used to be a major center of Tantra Vidya. The origination of the ancient Vikramshila University is also related to this place which is three kilometers away from the temple. Earlier Tantra Vidya was taught in the ancient Vikramshila University.

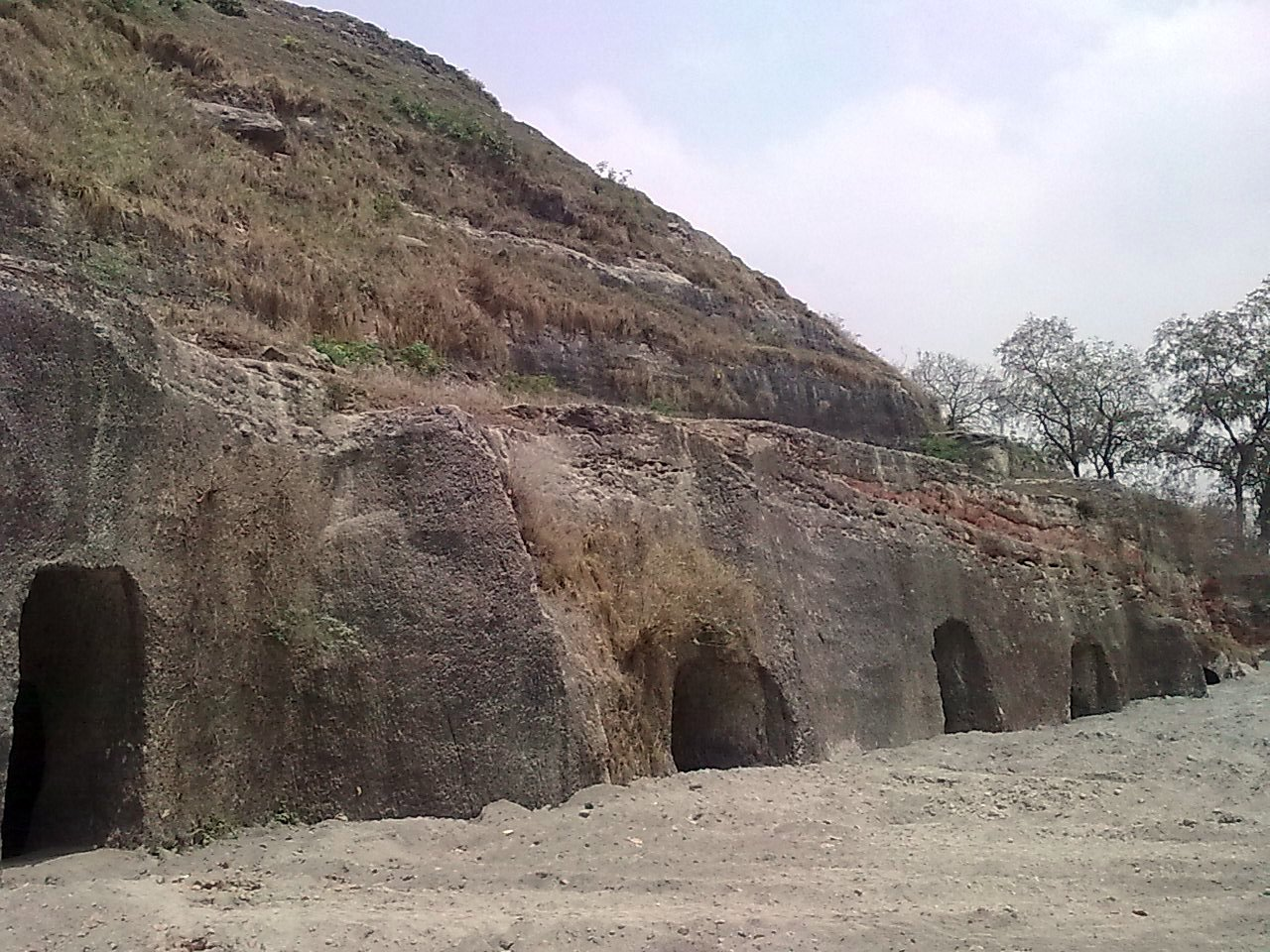
Bateshwar Caves South

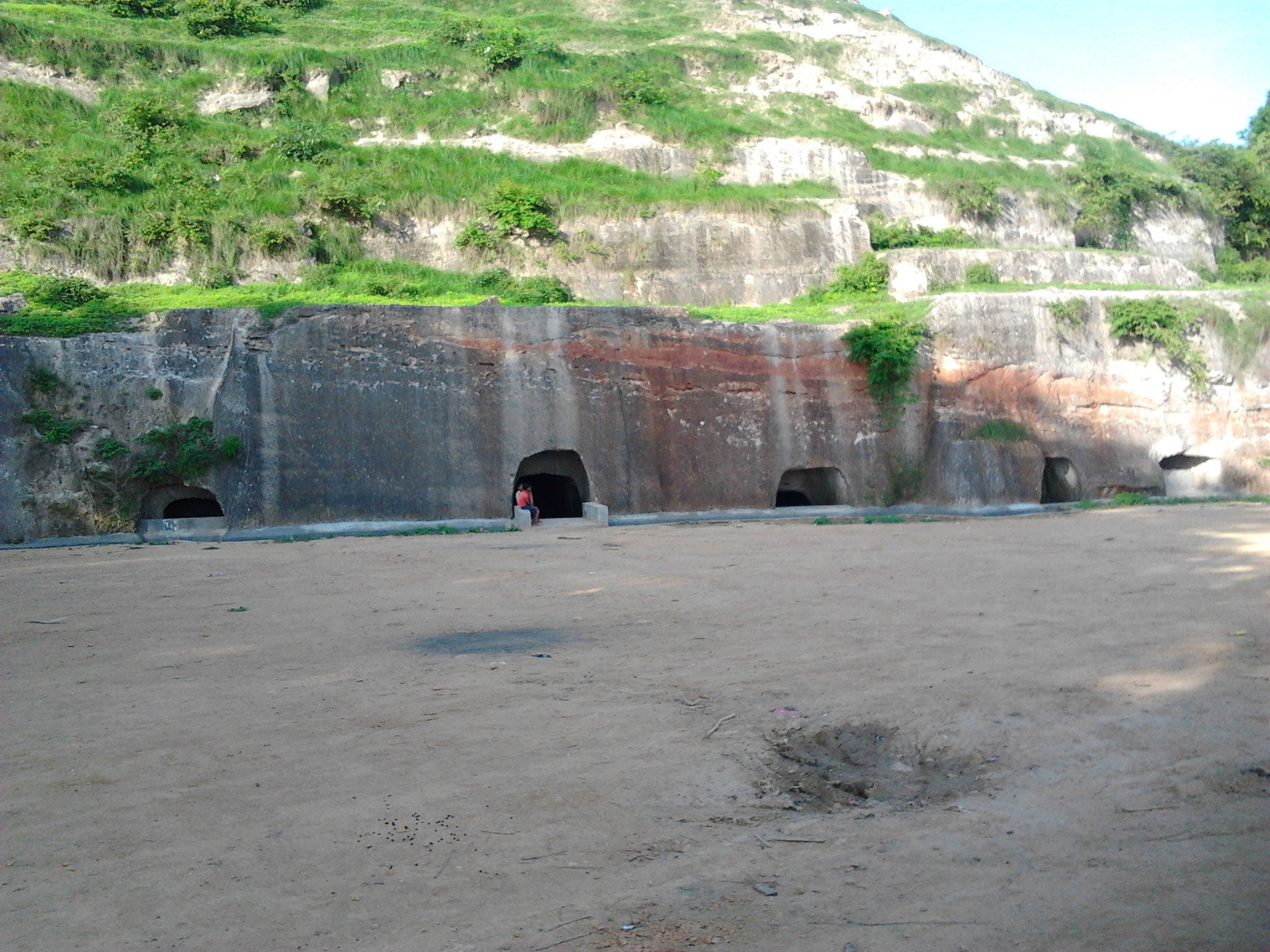
Caves at Bateshwar Sthan

== History ==
It is said that the temple was built in 1216 CE by the King of Sen Dynasty in Bengal. According to the Vangiya Kayastha Kul Panchika, during the reign of the Sen rulers of Bengal, Ballala Sena came here and worshipped the Shiva lingam on the occasion of declaring his father-in-law Vata Krishna Mitra as the king of Magadha. Similarly it was renovated in 1272 CE by Mathuranatha Chattopadhyaya who a resident of Hooghly in Bengal.
