= Trimohini Sangam =

Confluence of rivers in Bihar, India

Trimohini Sangam is a confluence of rivers located near Kursela village in Katihar district, Bihar state, India. There the river Koshi meets with the Ganges, with which a small stream of Kalbalia river originates. Trimohini Sangam is one of the 12 banks on which the ashes of Mahatma Gandhi were immersed on 12 February 1948.

In order to develop this place as a tourist destination, the Bihar State Tourism Department approved a plan of Rs 3.50 crore in the 2017-18 financial year.

== Attractions ==
This area has been named as Sunder Nagar by Sangam Baba for the coast. The construction of a temple has been started for the establishment of Raneshwar Kamna Linga near this site.

- Guide Dam Lake: the shore bandh done on the banks of Koshi, a tributary of Trimohini Sangam, which is known as Guide Dam Lake. More than 150 species of birds are present.
- Baba Bateshwarnath Temple: near the Sangam is the temple of Baba Bateshwarnath.
- Maghi Purnima Mela: a [mMelā]] is held annually at Trimohini Sangam on the occasion of Maghi Purnima. Thousands of devotees from many districts of Bihar and also from Nepal reach Trimohini Sangam for bathing in the Ganges.
- Kartik Purnima: pilgrims from India and abroad bathe at Trimohini Sangam on Kartik Purnima.

=== Mahatma Gandhi's Samadhi Sthal ===
After the death of Mahatma Gandhi, his ashes were immersed on 12 February 1948 at Trimohini Sangam beach, along with 12 other Sangam beaches of the country. An agricultural fair used to be held at the beach every year to commemorate it.

=== Proposed tourism development plan ===
In January 2021, a development plan was proposed to build a cafeteria, pathway, parking lot, entrance, and water supply in the area. The estimated time to completion was two years.
