= Partapnagar, Bhagalpur =

Village in Bihar, India

Partapnagar
- Village
- Location within Bihar Location within India
- Coordinates: 25°24′07″N 87°04′51″E
- Country: India
- State: Bihar
- District: Bhagalpur
- Block: Naugachhia

Government
  - Type: Sarpanch

Area
  - Total: 34.9 km^{2} (13.5 sq mi)
- Elevation: 38 m (125 ft)

Population (2011)
  - Total: 35,878
  - Density: 1,030/km^{2} (2,660/sq mi)

Languages
  - Common: Angika, Hindi
- Time zone: UTC+5:30 (IST)
- PIN: 853204
- STD code: 06421
- Vehicle registration: BR-10

Partapnagar is a village in Naugachhia Block, Bhagalpur District, Bihar, India. It is located on the north of Bhagalpur District, about 20 kilometres northeast of the district capital Bhagalpur, and 2 kilometres northwest of the block capital Naugachhia. In the year 2011, it had a population of 35,878.

== Geography ==
Partapnagar is located to the south of Kosi River. It has a total land area of 3490 hectares.

== Demographics ==
At the time of the 2011 census, the number of households in Partapnagar was 6,206. Among the 35,878 residents, 18,829 were male and 17,049 were female. The overall literacy rate was 42.65%, as 50.03% of the male population and 34.49% of the female population were literate.
