= Bateshwar, Uttar Pradesh =

Bateshwar, Uttar Pradesh Bah Bateshwar
- Village
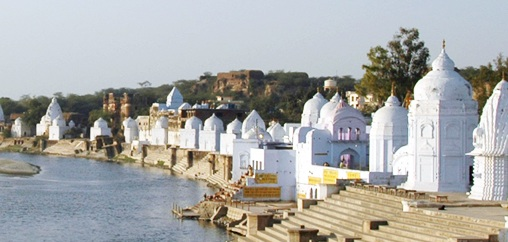
- Nickname: Bateshwar
- Location within Uttar Pradesh Location within India
- Coordinates: 26.936°N 78.542°E
- Country: India
- State: Uttar Pradesh
- District: Agra
- Elevation: 160 m (520 ft)

Population (2010)
  - Total: 6,041

Languages
  - Official: Hindi
- Time zone: UTC+5:30 (IST)
- PIN: 283104
- Vehicle registration: UP-80
- Website: up.gov.in

Bateshwar is a village in Agra District, on the banks of the river Yamuna in the northern state of Uttar Pradesh, India. Bateshwar is in between Agra and Etawah and is 8 km from Bah. It is an important spiritual and cultural centre for Hindus and Jains. It is known for the 101 Shiv Temple Complex. An annual religious and animal fair is also organised in the village ground area.

The name Bateshwar is derived from the main Bateshwarnath Temple dedicated to Lord Shiva (Bateshwarnath Mahadev). As per legends, here under a marvelous Banyan tree (Bat in Sanskrit), lord Shiva took rest for some time under that tree which is still standing at that place, the place hence came to be known as Bateshwar (i.e. Bat ishwar or The banyan lord).

== Landscape ==
To reach Bateshwar one has to travel between the sand dunes of Chambal. The area is less populated.

== Climate ==
Bateshwar features a semiarid climate that borders on a humid subtropical climate. The village features mild winters, hot and dry summers and a monsoon season.

Climate data for Bateshwar, bah, uttar pradesh India
Month	Jan	Feb	Mar	Apr	May	Jun	Jul	Aug	Sep	Oct	Nov	Dec	Year
Mean daily maximum °C (°F)	22.3 (72.1)	25.5 (77.9)	31.9 (89.4)	37.9 (100.2)	41.7 (107.1)	40.7 (105.3)	35.3 (95.5)	33.2 (91.8)	34.0 (93.2)	34.0 (93.2)	29.2 (84.6)	23.9 (75.0)	32.5 (90.4)
Mean daily minimum °C (°F)	7.7 (45.9)	10.3 (50.5)	15.4 (59.7)	21.5 (70.7)	26.5 (79.7)	28.9 (84.0)	26.8 (80.2)	25.7 (78.3)	24.3 (75.7)	19.1 (66.4)	12.5 (54.5)	8.2 (46.8)	18.9 (66.0)
Average rainfall mm (inches)	13.3 (0.52)	17.7 (0.70)	9.1 (0.36)	6.7 (0.26)	11.9 (0.47)	55.7 (2.19)	203.3 (8.00)	241.1 (9.49)	128.5 (5.06)	25.2 (0.99)	4.3 (0.17)	6.0 (0.24)	722.8 (28.45)
Average rainy days	1.9	1.7	1.7	1.3	2.3	4.7	13.8	14.9	7.7	1.5	0.8	1.0	53.3
Source: World Meteorological Organization.

== Culture ==
Since ages Bateshwar remained a renowned religious centre both for Hindu and Jain communities. In the epic Mahabharat Bateshwar is supposed to be referred as Shouripur a city of king Suresaine. It is known for 101 Shiv Temples built by Raja Badan Singh Bhadauria on a dam on the banks of Yamuna. Shaouripur, near Bateshwar, which is the birthplace of the 22nd Tirthankar of Jain faith, Lord Neminath. Each year the region hosts a cattle fair in October and November. The commercial livestock event is also of significance to Hindus, who make pilgrimage to the river Yamuna in honor of Shiva.

Bateshwar has long been celebrated for its annual fair, believed to have been a fixture since time immemorial given the significance of Shoripur/Bateshwar in Hindu texts. Although the origins of this ancient fair are religious, and of immense importance in the Hindu religious calendar, the fair is also of great commercial value, and is renowned as the 2nd largest animal fair in the country (Sonepur in Bihar being the largest).

== Tourism ==
=== Shri Shouripur Digambar and shwetambar Jain Siddha Kshetra ===
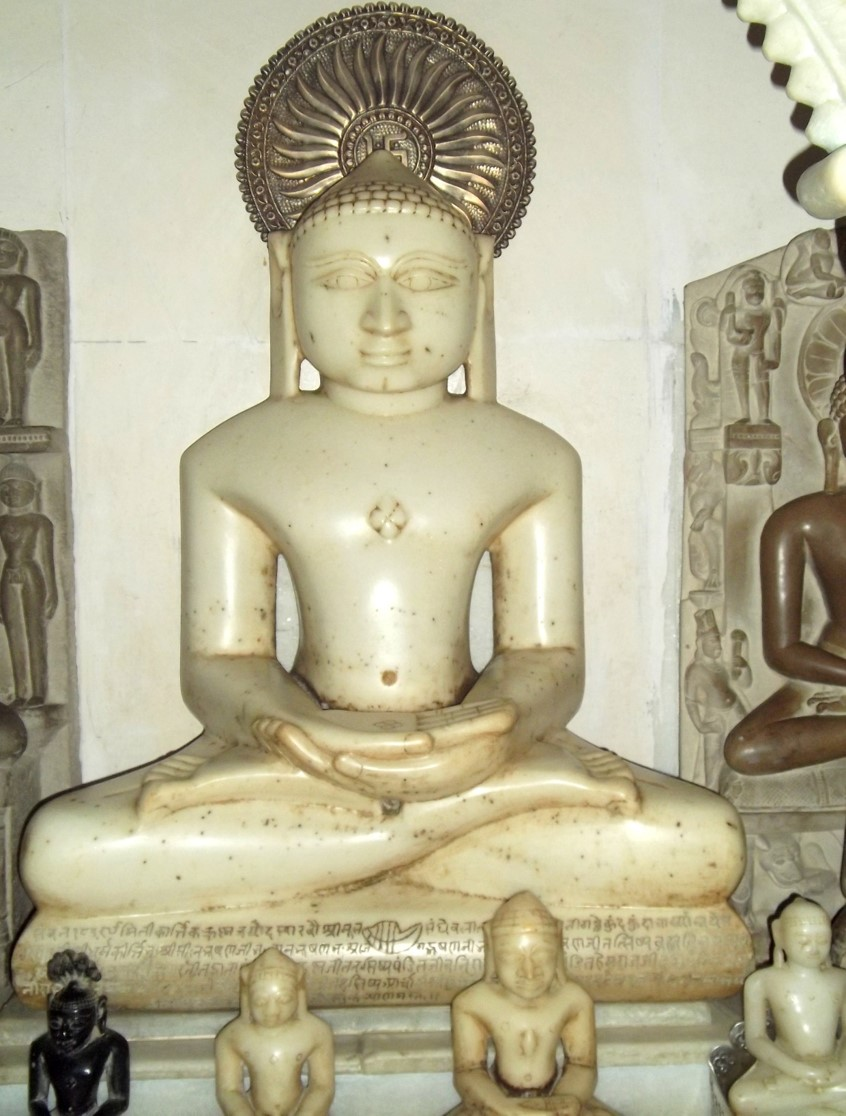
Image of Bhagwan Neminatha in the Bateshwar Jain temple

This teerth is the birthplace of 22nd Teerthankar of Jainism, Bhagwan Shri Neminath. Following are the temples present in the area:

Baruva Matha: It is the most ancient temple of Shouripur, which is constructed on a platform. The quite magnificent Black stone's Kayotsarga idol of principal deity Bhagwan Neminath was reverenced in 1953. This idol is 8 feet high. There is a spire made of stone above the idol and behind idol there is an artistic halo is present carved in stone. On the feet base (Charan Peeth) the two lions are constructed facing each other and in between these two there is an image of Conch shell. In Yadav Jains, there is a tradition of lighting of 'Diya' on Kartik Shukla 14 here whenever there is death of any Yadav Jain takes place. Among Vaishnav Yadav Vanshi's this 'Diya' is lighted in Bateshwar on waters of Yamuna River.

Shankha Dhwaj Mandir: This temple is constructed on the second story. There are four altars present in the sanctum of this temple. In central altar idol of principal deity Bhagwan Neminath are installed. There are two idols of 11th – 12th century installed in this temple and the idols of Bhagwan Parshvanath, Bhagwan Chandraprabhu and Bhagwan Vimalnath reverenced in V.S. 1357 (I. S. 1300) are collectively installed in the second altar of this temple. Many other artistic ancient idols are also installed here.

Panch Mathi: On the left hand side of Shankha Dhwaj Mandir the ancient Tonks & spires (umbrellas) are constructed in one ground which is surrounded by walls from all sides. This place is called as Panch Mathi. The foot images of Muni 'Yama' & Muni 'Dhanya' are installed here.

=== Bateshwar Temples ===
Bateshwar Temples are the collection of 108 Shiv Temples built by Raja Badan Singh Bhadauria. These are called Bateshwar Temples because As per the legends, here under a marvelous Banyan tree (Bat in Sanskrit), lord Shiva took rest for some time under that tree which is still standing at that place, the place hence came to be known as Bateshwar (i.e. Bat ishwar or The banyan lord).Bateshwar Dham

== Transportation ==
Bateshwar is connected by road and rail. The Agra – Bah Road passes through this town and has a major impact on the development. Bateshwar Halt railway station is a small halt station. Bandra Terminus – Ghazipur City Weekly Express and Agra Cantt. – Mainpuri DEMU (via Etawah) connects the town with Mumbai, Agra, Ghazipur, Mainpuri and Etawah. Saifai Airstrip is nearest airstrip for private airplanes, Agra Airport and Gwalior Airport are two nearest domestic airports with regular scheduled flights. Major Railway Stations near to Bateshwar -Shikohabad Junction (23km), Etawah Junction(55km), Firozabad Railway Station (55km),Tundla Junction (65km),Agra Cantt Railway Station (72km).

== Notable people ==
Bateshwar is the ancestral village of former prime minister Atal Bihari Vajpayee. Vajpayee's first exposure to politics was in August 1942, when he and his elder brother Prem were arrested at Bateshwar for 23 days during the Quit India movement.
