= Vikramshila Setu =

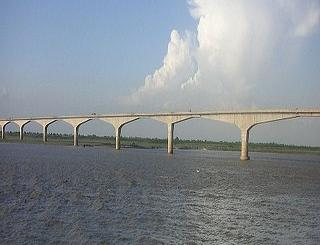
- Coordinates: 25°16′41″N 87°01′37″E
- Carries: one lane roadway
- Locale: Bhagalpur
- Maintained by: Bihar Government

Characteristics
- Material: Concrete and Iron
- Total length: 4,400 metres (14,400 ft)

History
- Construction end: 2001
- Opened: 2001
- Closed: 4th May 2026

Statistics
- Daily traffic: two way
- Toll: For Heavy vehicle and four wheelers

Location
- Interactive map of Vikramshila Setu

Vikramshila Setu is a bridge across the Ganges, near Bhagalpur in the Indian state of Bihar. It is named after the ancient Mahavihara of Vikramashila which was established by King Dharmapala (783 to 820 A.D.) .

Vikramshila Setu is 6th longest bridge over water in India. The 4.4 km long two lane bridge serves as a link between NH 33 and NH 31 running on the opposite sides of the Ganges. It runs from Barari Ghat on the Bhagalpur side on the south bank of the Ganges to Naugachhia on the north bank. It also connects Bhagalpur to Purnia and Katihar. This has reduced considerably the road travel between Bhagalpur and places across the Ganges.

However, there is intense traffic congestion on the bridge due to increased traffic and there is now a demand to construct another bridge parallel to it. On 21 September 2020 Prime Minister Mr Narendra Modi laid the foundation stone of another 4 lane road bridge of 4.4 km length over Ganga river parallel to Vikramshila Setu at cost of ₹1110.23 crore. In June 2018, another 24 km-long Vikramshila - Kataria rail-cum-road bridge between Vikramshila railway station (near Pirpainty south of Ganga) and Kataria railway station (near Naugachia railway station) north of the Ganga, with an expenditure of ₹4,379.01 crore was approved.

It serves as only connection towards Bhagalpur side of area due vast and long expansion of Ganga river isolating both side of area. People earlier were totally dependent on small boats and steamers that would carry them from Naugachhia side of shore to Bhagalpur mainland and city and all the land areas beyond, which was isolated for very long due to lack of land connection between the area.

== Collapse ==
On 4 May 2026, the Vikramshila Setu partially collapsed, beginning with structural failures at pillar number 133 around 11.55 p.m, followed by a total span collapse at 1.07 am that split the 4.7-kilometre-long bridge into two, prompting authorities to halt traffic on the bridge.. Issues with the bridge had been reported about a month ago.

== Aftermath ==
The partial collapse of the Vikramshila Setu disrupted traffic across the Ganga near Bhagalpur, forcing vehicles to take longer detours and causing economic disruption in southern Bihar and the Kosi–Seemanchal regions. lots of people turned to boats to cross the Ganga, often facing inflated fares and unsafe conditions. state govt sought assistance from the Indian Army and Border Roads Organisation (BRO) to expedite repairs

== See also ==
- Bridges in Bihar
- List of longest bridges in the world
- List of longest bridges above water in India
