= Kursela =

- Location in Bihar
- Coordinates: 25.451°N 87.252°E
- Country: India
- States and union territories of India: Bihar
- Region: Seemanchal
- District: Katihar District

Population (2011)
  - Total: 63,928

Languages
  - Official: Hindi, Urdu
  - Regional: Angika, Surjapuri

Kursela is a Town situated in the bank of Trimohini Sangam, which is the confluence of the river Ganga and Kosi . It is the de facto financial centre of Katihar district. As per the Indian government population census of 2011, Kursela was reported to have (Town proper) population of 63,928. Being a major wheat and maize producing village, around 40% of its production is transported to neighbouring districts. Kursela is also famous for its grand Chhath celebration at the bank of river Kosi and Ganga. Kursela consist of majorly 10 villages: Gobrahi Diara, Balthi, Basuhar, Debipur Kathi, Dhobinia Milik Dakhinwari, Gobrahi Diara, Tingharia, Shahpur Dharmi Milik, Muradpur, Madhaili and Jarlahi. 45.99% population of Kursela subdivision is literate, out of which 52.83% males and 38.44% females are literate. There are about 12,533 houses in the sub-district. Kursela Day is celebrated on 8 September every year in Kursela and neighbouring villages.

== Geography ==
It is located at an elevation of 25 m above MSL. Located at the north-east part of Bihar, it is surrounded by river Ganga and Kosi River . Kursela consist of three major region - Ayodhyaganj Bazar (located between Kursela Railway Station and NH 31), Teenghariya (at the bank of Ganga and Kursela Basti (at the bank of Kosi River). The total area of Kursela is 156 km^{2}. Population density is 410/km^{2}.

== Location ==
Kursela is situated on the banks of the river Kosi, which is a major river in the region. The town is surrounded by several other towns and cities, including Katihar, Manihari, and Sahibganj. It is well-connected to these areas by road and railhari, and Sahibganj. It is well-connected to these areas by road and rail.

== Origin of name and Mythological History ==
Kursela is a variant of Kuru-Shila, which translates as the hilly part of the region which once belonged to the king Kuru, the descendants of whom were called Kauravas and, in the Mahabharata, waged a war with the Pandavas, their cousins.

== History ==
Kursela has a long and rich history that dates back to ancient times. The town was once a part of the Magadha Empire, which was one of the most powerful empires in ancient India. The Magadha Empire was ruled by several dynasties, including the Haryanka dynasty and the Mauryan dynasty.

During the Mauryan period, Kursela was an important center of trade and commerce. It was located on the trade route that connected the eastern parts of India with the northern and western parts of the country. The town was also known for its rich agricultural produce, which made it a prosperous center of agriculture.

In the medieval period, Kursela came under the rule of various kingdoms, including the Pala dynasty and the Sena dynasty. These kingdoms contributed to the growth and development of the town, and Kursela continued to be an important center of trade and commerce.

Kursela was a Zamindari under British India. Rai Bahadur Raghubansh Prasad Singh was a great philanthropist, and administrator. He belong to Sisodia clan of Rajputs. The Singhs were the largest land donor in Vinoba Bhave's Bhoodan movement, wherein he donated 6,000 acres (24 km^{2}) of land. He sponsored the opening of two schools and a hospital in Kursela. He also donated many houses and land to the congress party including the "Kala Bhavan" in Purnea. Kursela is famous for it integrity among various religion
