= Kahalgaon Super Thermal Power Station =

Indian coal power plant

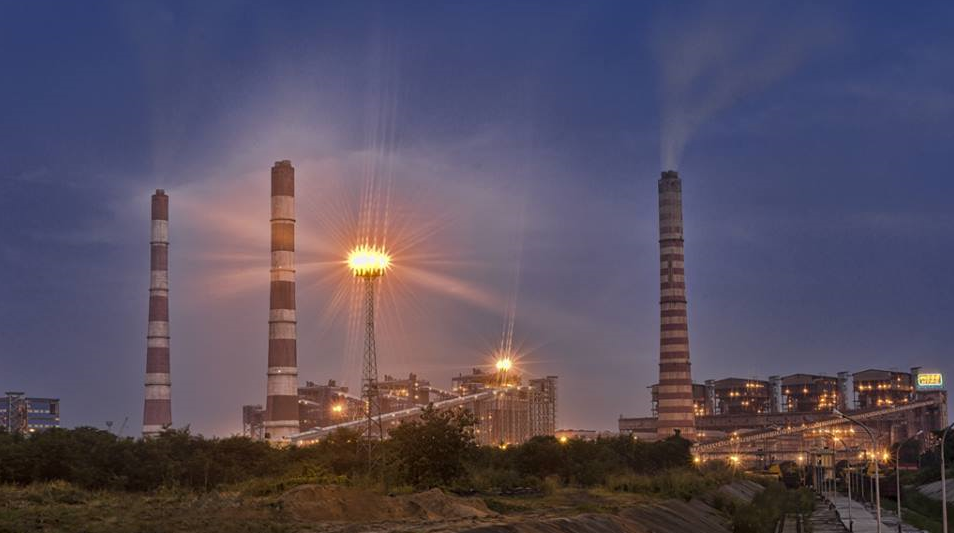
- Location of the Kahalgaon Super Thermal Power Station
- Country: India
- Location: Kahalgaon, Bhagalpur district of Bihar
- Coordinates: 25°14′24″N 87°15′53″E
- Status: Operational
- Commission date: 1992; 2007
- Construction cost: 7907.35 Crore
- Owner: NTPC

Thermal power station
- Primary fuel: Coal

Power generation
- Units operational: 4 X 210 MW; 3 X 500 MW
- Make and model: LMZ; Electorsila; BHEL; Transcon Industries
- Nameplate capacity: 2,340 MW

External links
- Website: www.ntpc.co.in/power-generation/coal-based-power-stations/kahalgaon

Kahalgaon Super Thermal Power Station (KhSTPP)is located in Kahalgaon in Bhagalpur district of Bihar. The power plant is one of the coal based power plants of NTPC. The coal for the power plant is sourced from Rajmahal coalfield of Eastern Coalfields Limited. Source of water for the power plant is Ganga River.

== Capacity ==
The work of NTPC Super Thermal Power Plant in Kahalgaon started in 1985. In March 1992, the first unit of 210 MW capacity was commissioned. Gradually, its capacity was increased. The total installed capacity of the plant is 2,340 MW. In the plant, thirty-five thousand to fifty thousand tonnes (34,000 to 49,000 long tons; 39,000 to 55,000 short tons) of coal is used daily for power generation, which is supplied from the Rajmahal coalfield in Jharkhand. Nearly 65 lakh tons of fly ash comes out of the plant every year. Fly ash contains silica, alumina, mercury and iron.

Stage	Unit Number	Installed Capacity (MW)	Year of commissioning
1st	1	210	March 1992
1st	2	210	March 1994
1st	3	210	March 1995
1st	4	210	March 1996
2nd	5	500	March 2007
2nd	6	500	March 2008
2nd	7	500	June 2009
Total		2340	
