= Partapnagar, Supaul =

Village in Bihar, India

Partapnagar
- Village
- Location within Bihar Location within India
- Coordinates: 26°17′09″N 87°03′53″E
- Country: India
- State: Bihar
- District: Supaul
- Block: Chhatapur

Government
  - Type: Sarpanch

Area
  - Total: 5.04 km^{2} (1.95 sq mi)
- Elevation: 66 m (217 ft)

Population (2011)
  - Total: 2,504
  - Density: 497/km^{2} (1,290/sq mi)

Languages
  - Common: Maithili, Hindi
- Time zone: UTC+5:30 (IST)
- PIN: 852139
- STD code: 06477
- Vehicle registration: BR-50

Partapnagar is a village in Chhatapur Block, Supaul District, Bihar, India. It is situated near India's northern border with Nepal, about 49 kilometres northeast of the district seat Supaul, and 9 kilometres northeast of the block seat Chhatapur. The village had a total population of 2,504 as of the 2011 census.

== Geography ==
Partapnagar is located to the east of the Bihar State Highway 91. The village sits on a land area of 504 hectares.

== Demographics ==
According to the 15th Indian Census, the household number of the village amounted to 496. Among the 2,504 residents, 1,292 were male and 1,212 were female. The average literacy rate was 35.10%, with 545 of the male population and 334 of the female population being literate.
