= Pratapnagar =

Pratapnagar or Protapnagar may refer to:

- Pratapnagar Assembly constituency, Uttarakhand, India
  - also subdivision, tehsil, block in Tehri Garhwal district, Uttarakhand, India
- Pratapnagar railway station, Vadodara, Gujarat, India
- Pratapnagar, a village in Protapnagar Union, Satkhira district, Bangladesh
