= Bateshwar Halt railway station =

Railway station in Uttar Pradesh, India

Bateshwar Halt

General information
- Location: Bah-Bateshwar Road, Uttar Pradesh; India
- Coordinates: 26.9080°N 78.5589°E
- Elevation: 159 metres (522 ft)
- System: Indian Railways station
- Owner: Indian Railways
- Operator: North Central Railway
- Platforms: 1
- Tracks: 2
- Connections: Auto stand

Construction
- Structure type: Standard (on-ground station)
- Parking: No
- Cycle facilities: No

Other information
- Status: Single diesel line
- Station code: BASR
- Zone(s): North Central Railway
- Division(s): Agra
Location
- Location within India Location within Uttar Pradesh

Bateshwar Halt railway station is a small railway station in Agra district, Uttar Pradesh. Its code is BASR. It serves Bateshwar town. The station consists of one platform. The platform is not well sheltered. It lacks many facilities including water and sanitation.

== Trains ==
- Bandra Terminus–Ghazipur City Weekly Express
- Agra Cantt.–Mainpuri DEMU (via Etawah)
- Bateshwar railway station
- Mainpuri–Agra Cantt. DEMU
