= Naugachhia =

Town in Bihar, India

- Town
- Location in Bihar, India Naugachhia (India)
- Coordinates: 25.4°N 87.1°E
- Country: India
- State: Bihar
- Region: Mithila

Government
  - Type: Nagar Parishad
  - Body: Naugachhia Nagar Parishad

Area
  - Total: 113 km^{2} (44 sq mi)
- Elevation: 25 m (82 ft)

Population (2011)
  - Total: 49,069
  - Density: 1,370/km^{2} (3,500/sq mi)
- Demonym: Maithil/Mithilawasi

Language
  - Regional language: Maithili
- Time zone: UTC+5:30 (IST)
- PIN: 853204
- Telephone code: 06421
- Vehicle registration: BR10

Naugachhia is a town in the Bhagalpur district of Bihar, situated within the Mithila region of India. In the 2011 census of India, its population was recorded as 49,069. Naugachhia has an average literacy rate of 62%, lower than the national average of 74%: male literacy is 69%, and female literacy is 55%. 18% of the population is under 9 years of age.

Naugachhia may meet the criteria to be a separate district from Bhagalpur. In 2018, a rally was held supporting creating a new district for the town.

== Geography and connectivity ==
Naugachhia is located in Bhagalpur district, Bihar, on the northern bank of the Ganges River within the Kosi basin, at coordinates approximately 25.4°N, 87.1°E and an elevation of 25 meters. The town is prone to flooding due to the Kosi River, often called the "Sorrow of Bihar." Naugachhia is a key transportation hub, served by the Naugachhia railway station (station code: NNA) on the Barauni–Katihar section, with connectivity to major trains like the New Delhi–Dibrugarh Rajdhani Express. The Vikramshila Setu, a 4.7 km bridge, connects Naugachhia to Bhagalpur across the Ganges, linking National Highways 31 and 33. The town’s strategic location, 15.6 miles from Bhagalpur, supports its role as a regional commercial center.

== Demographics ==
As per the 2011 Census, Naugachhia had a population of 49,069, with a literacy rate of 62% (male: 69%, female: 55%), below the national average of 74%. Approximately 18% of the population is under 9 years old. The primary language is Maithili, a regional language of the Mithila.

== Economy and Infrastructure ==
Naugachhia serves as a commercial hub in Bhagalpur district, with markets, shopping centers, and several educational institutions. The town hosts a 132/33KV BSPTCL Grid Substation, ensuring reliable power supply. Agriculture and fisheries, supported by the Ganges, are key economic drivers, alongside small businesses and trade. Naugachhia’s connectivity via rail and the Vikramshila Setu bolsters its economic activity. The town is also famous for its high quality banana cultivation. Maize is the most important crop in Naugachia Sub-Division, covering 41% of the cultivated area, followed by wheat at 29%.

== Tourism ==
=== Jagatpur Lake ===
Jagatpur Lake, a freshwater wetland located in Jagatpur village, Naugachhia block, approximately 12 km north-east of Bhagalpur city, is a significant ecological and emerging tourist site within the Mithila region. Recognized for its rich biodiversity, the lake supports over 170 bird species, including migratory birds from the trans-Himalayan ranges, Central Asia, and Siberia, as well as endangered species like the Greater and Lesser Adjutants. Its aquatic and terrestrial flora, including dominant species like Eichhornia crassipes and Hydrilla verticillata, contribute to its role as a vital ecosystem in the Ganges plain.

The lake’s ecological significance is underscored by its role as a breeding ground for protected bird species and its contribution to the region’s biodiversity, aligning with Bihar’s Jal Jeevan Hariyali conservation program. However, challenges such as eutrophication, invasive species, and urbanization threaten its ecosystem, necessitating conservation efforts. As a tourist destination, Jagatpur Lake is being developed into an ecotourism hub to attract bird-watchers and nature enthusiasts. In 2025, Bhagalpur’s District Development Commissioner announced plans to enhance infrastructure, including bird-watching centers, rest houses, and road connectivity, while preserving the wetland’s biodiversity. Initiatives like boating and guided birding tours are planned to boost local employment and promote the lake as a global ecotourism spot. Events such as World Wetlands Day celebrations at the lake highlight its growing recognition.

=== Tetri Durga Sthan ===
The Tetri Durga Sthan, a historic Shakti Peeth in Tetari village, Naugachhia, is a prominent religious site in the Mithila region, 20 km north of Bhagalpur. Established circa 1600 CE, the temple’s origin stems from a divine vision guiding villagers to a sacred mound. Revered for its 425-year-old legacy, it draws thousands during Navratri for its vibrant fair and rituals, including kalash fasting. Known as Bihar’s tallest Durga temple, it attracts devotees year-round, enhancing Naugachhia’s religious tourism alongside nearby Vikramshila Ruins and Jagatpur Lake.

== Transport ==
The town is connected via rail through the Naugachhia railway station which is on the Barauni–Katihar section of the Sonpur railway division.

Vikramshila Setu is 6th longest bridge over water in India. The 4.7 km long two lane bridge serves as a link between NH 33 and NH 31 running on the opposite sides of the Ganges, connecting Bhagalpur side on the south bank of the Ganges to Naugachhia on the north bank.
