= Kahalgaon =

City in Bhagalpur, Bihar, India

Kahalgaon Colgong
- Town
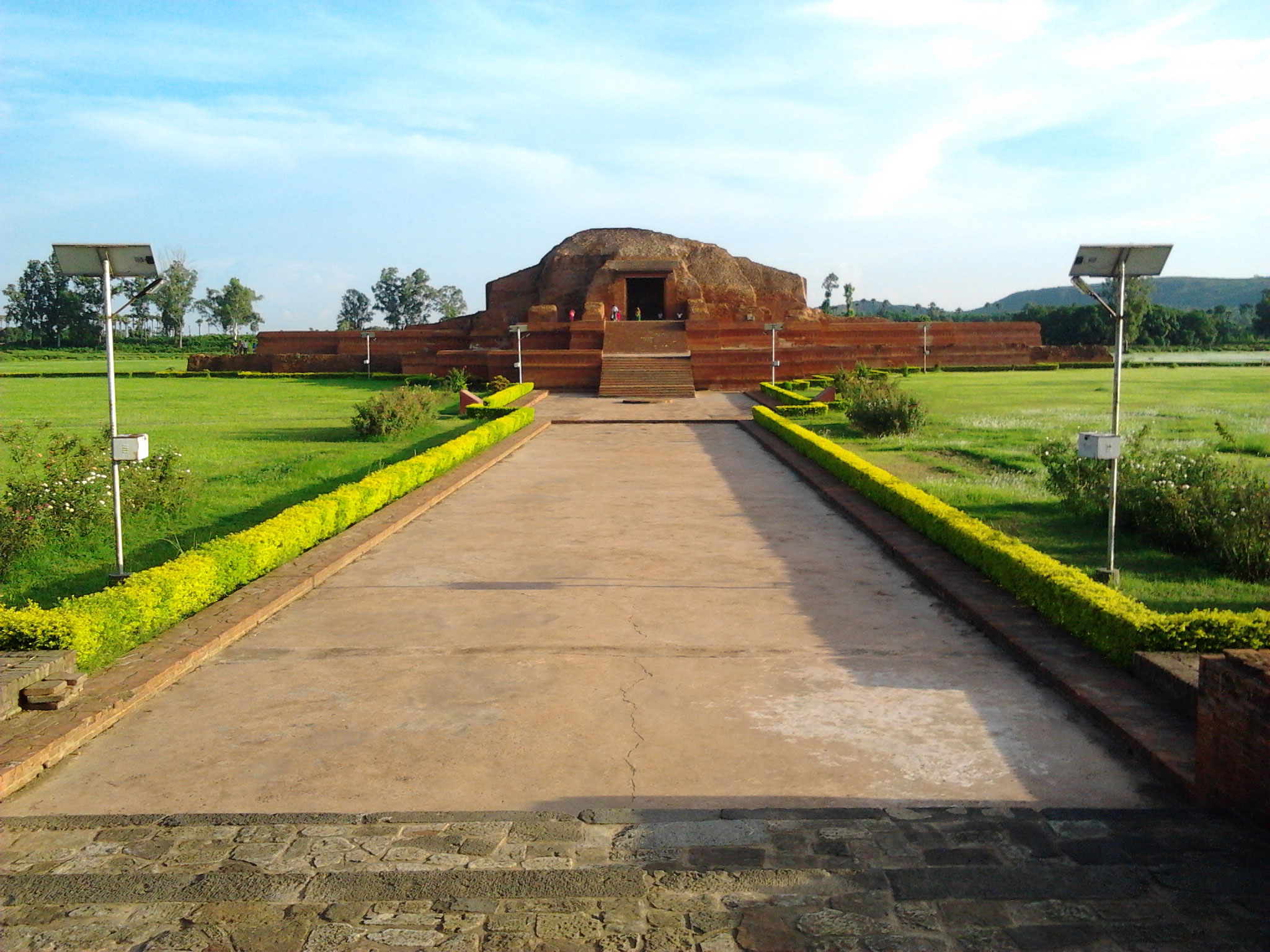
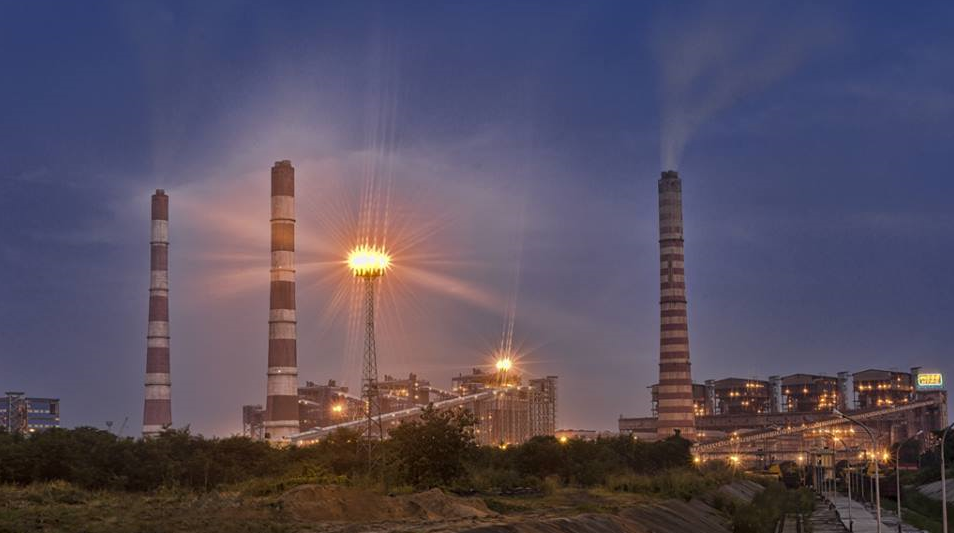
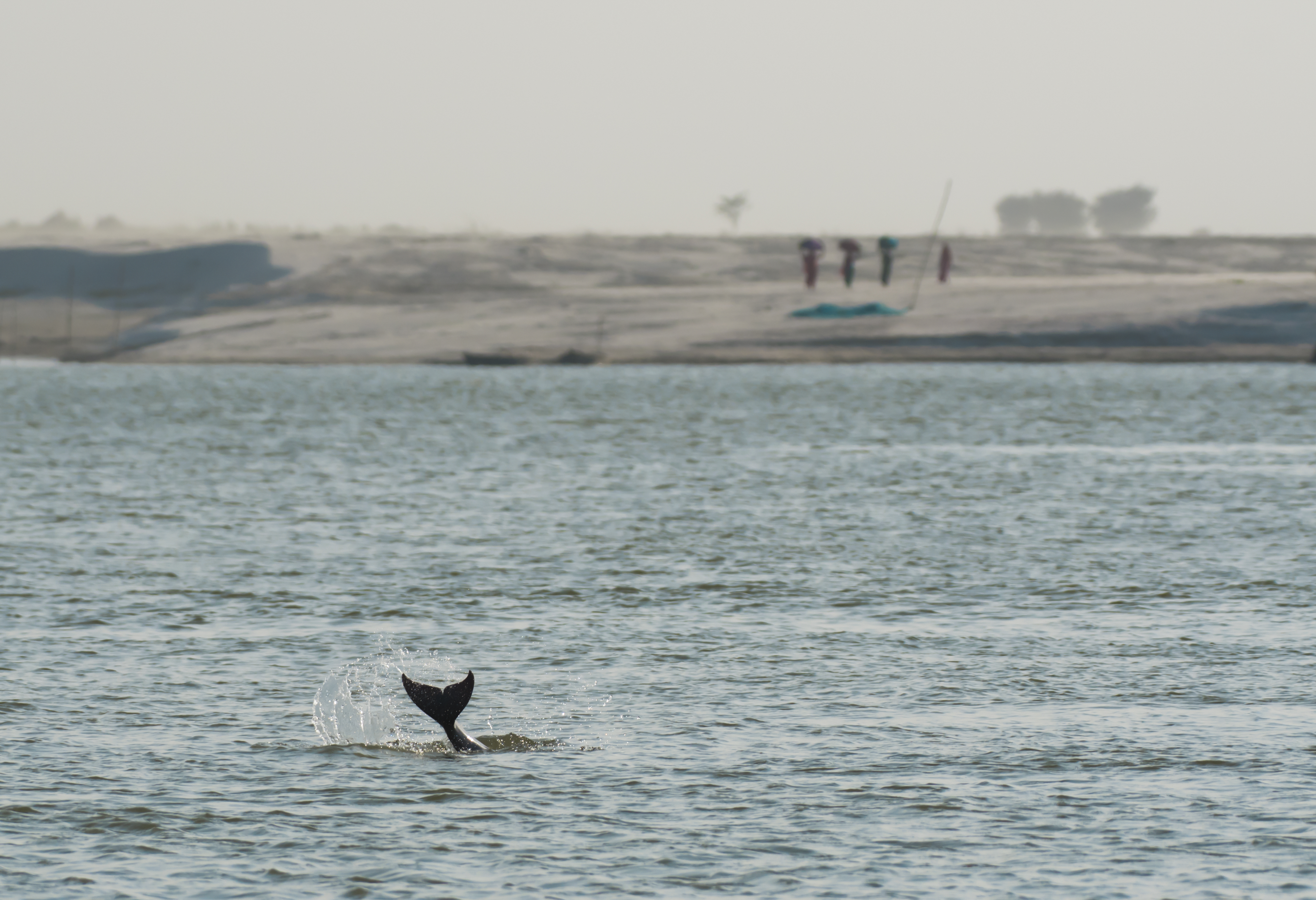
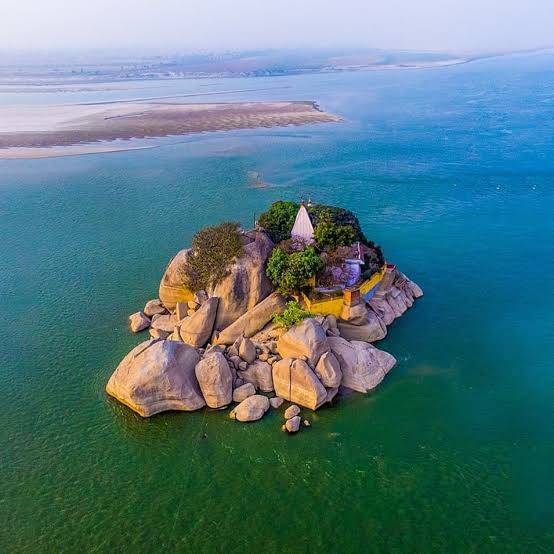
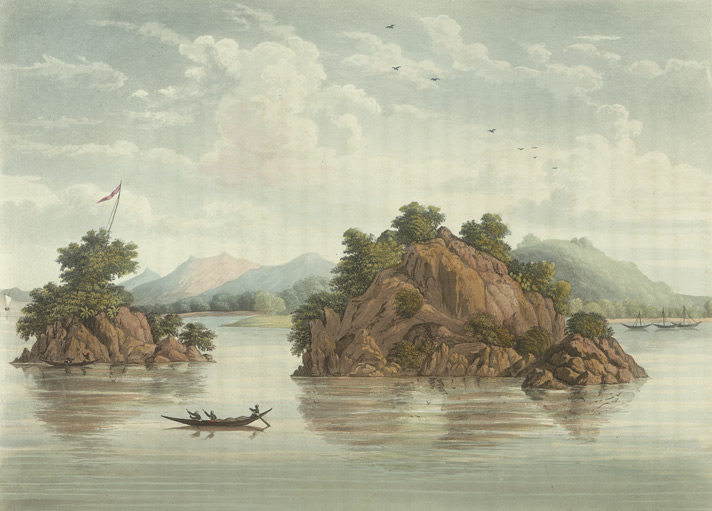
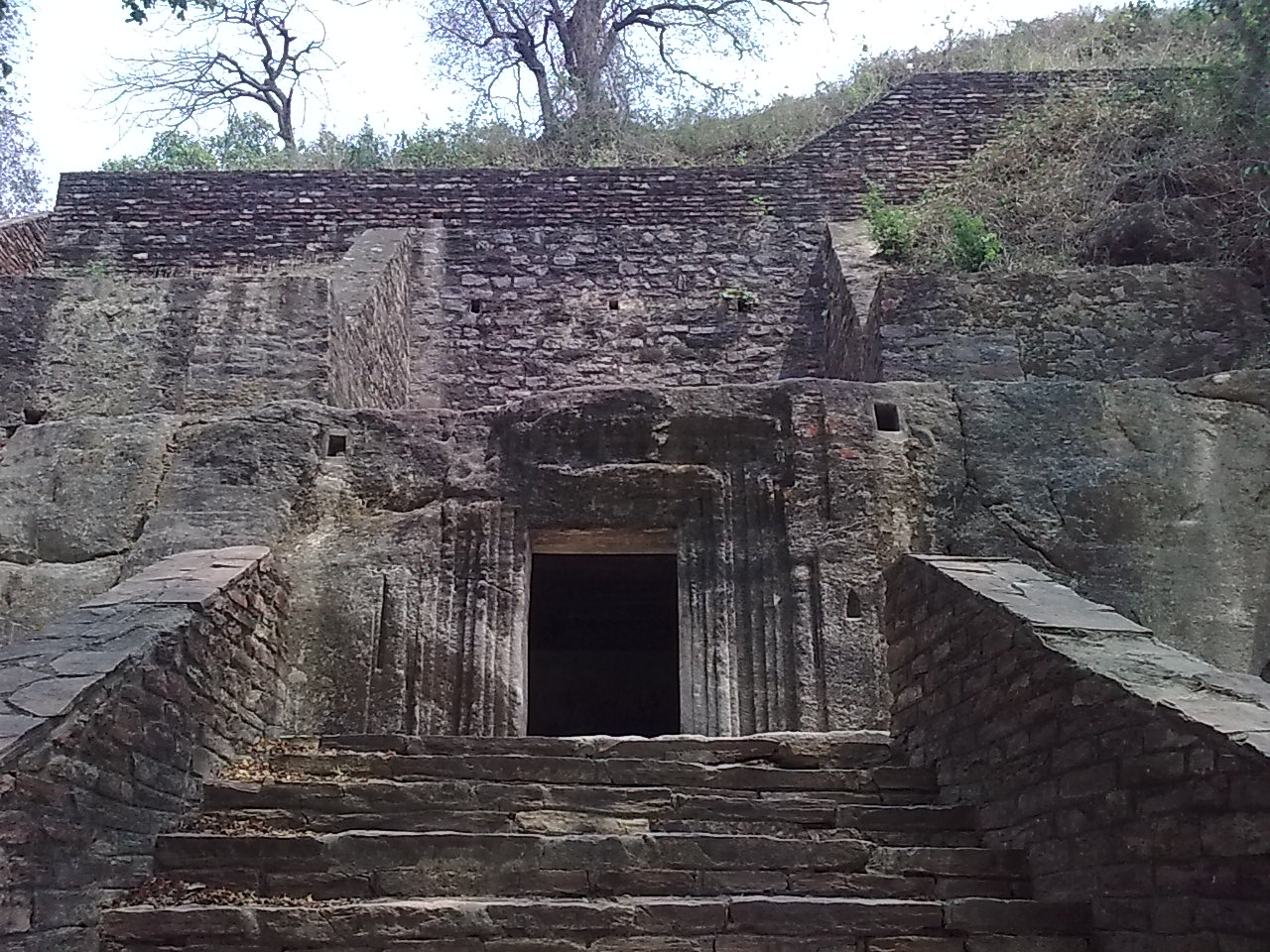
- Vikramshila Kahalgaon Super Thermal Power Station Vikramshila Gangetic Dolphin Sanctuary Mountain of Kahalgaon Colgong Rock Temple Bateshwar Sthan
- Nickname: CITY OF 7th NTPC
- Location of Kahalgaon in Bihar Kahalgaon (India)
- Coordinates: 25.27°N 87.22°E
- Country: India
- State: Bihar
- District: Bhagalpur
- Subdivision: Kahalgaon subdivision
- Block: Kahalgaon block
- Assembly constituency: Kahalgaon constituency and Pirpainti constituency
- Ward: 17

Government
  - Type: Municipality

Area
  - Total: 297 km^{2} (115 sq mi)
  - Town: 6 km^{2} (2.3 sq mi)
- Elevation: 16 m (52 ft)

Population (2023)
  - Total: 55,000
  - Density: 190/km^{2} (480/sq mi)

Language
  - Official: Hindi
  - Additional official: Urdu
  - Regional: Angika
- Time zone: UTC+5:30 (IST)
- Postal codes: 813203 ,813204
- Vehicle registration: BR 10

Kahalgaon (formerly known as Colgong) is a municipality in the Bhagalpur district of Bihar, India. The ruins of Vikramashila, a Buddhist monastic university founded by Dharmapala of the Pala Empire in the early ninth century, are located within the town. The Kahalgaon Super Thermal Power Station is also located 3 km from the town.

During the early 16th century, Kahalgaon served as the capital-in-exile of the Jaunpur Sultanate under Husain Shah Sharqi, who took refuge in the city after he was driven from Jaunpur by Sikandar Khan Lodi.

== Etymology ==
Kahalgaon is named after Kahoda, the father of the Vedic sage and philosopher Ashtavakra, who was born in the town according to local legend.

== Tourist attractions ==
=== Vikramashila ===
Located 13 km from Kahalgaon in the village of Antichak, the ruins of Vikramshila are a popular tourist destination and one of the most important historic places near Kahalgaon. A famous centre of learning during the ninth century, Vikramashila was founded by the Pala king Dharmapala. Various religious and educational subjects were taught at the institution including theology, philosophy, metaphysics, logic, and Tantric Buddhism. The complex consists of a large ruined Buddhist temple at its centre, surrounded by 108 smaller temples. Vikramashila produced a number of religious scholars, who were often invited by foreign empires to spread Buddhist learning, culture and religion. One of these scholars, Atisa Dipankara, would go on to found the Kadam school of Tibetan Buddhism.

=== Gangetic Dolphin Sanctuary ===
The Vikramshila Gangetic Dolphin Sanctuary is located in Kahalgaon, along the banks of the Ganges river. The sanctuary consists of a 60-kilometer stretch of the river from Sultanganj to Kahalgaon. Officially notified as the Vikramshila Gangetic Dolphin Sanctuary in 1991, it is maintained as a protected area for the endangered Gangetic dolphins in Asia. Once found in abundance, only a few hundred dolphins remain in the wild, of which roughly half are found in the sanctuary.

=== Archaeological Museum ===
An archaeological museum is located near the ruins of Vikramshila. The museum was established by the Union government in 2004.

=== Bateshwar Sthan ===
Bateshwar Sthan is situated on the banks of the Ganges river near Vikramshila. Named after the Vedic sage Vasishtha, it is an ancient temple dedicated to the Hindu deity Shiva. The temple sees a significant amount of tourist traffic during Shravana, the fifth month of the Hindu calendar.

=== Shivkumari ===
Shivkumari Hill is a double summit hill located east of the Kahalgaon railway station. It is the highest peak in the town of Kahalgaon, with a mosque located on the taller peak and a Shiva temple located on the shorter hill.

== History ==
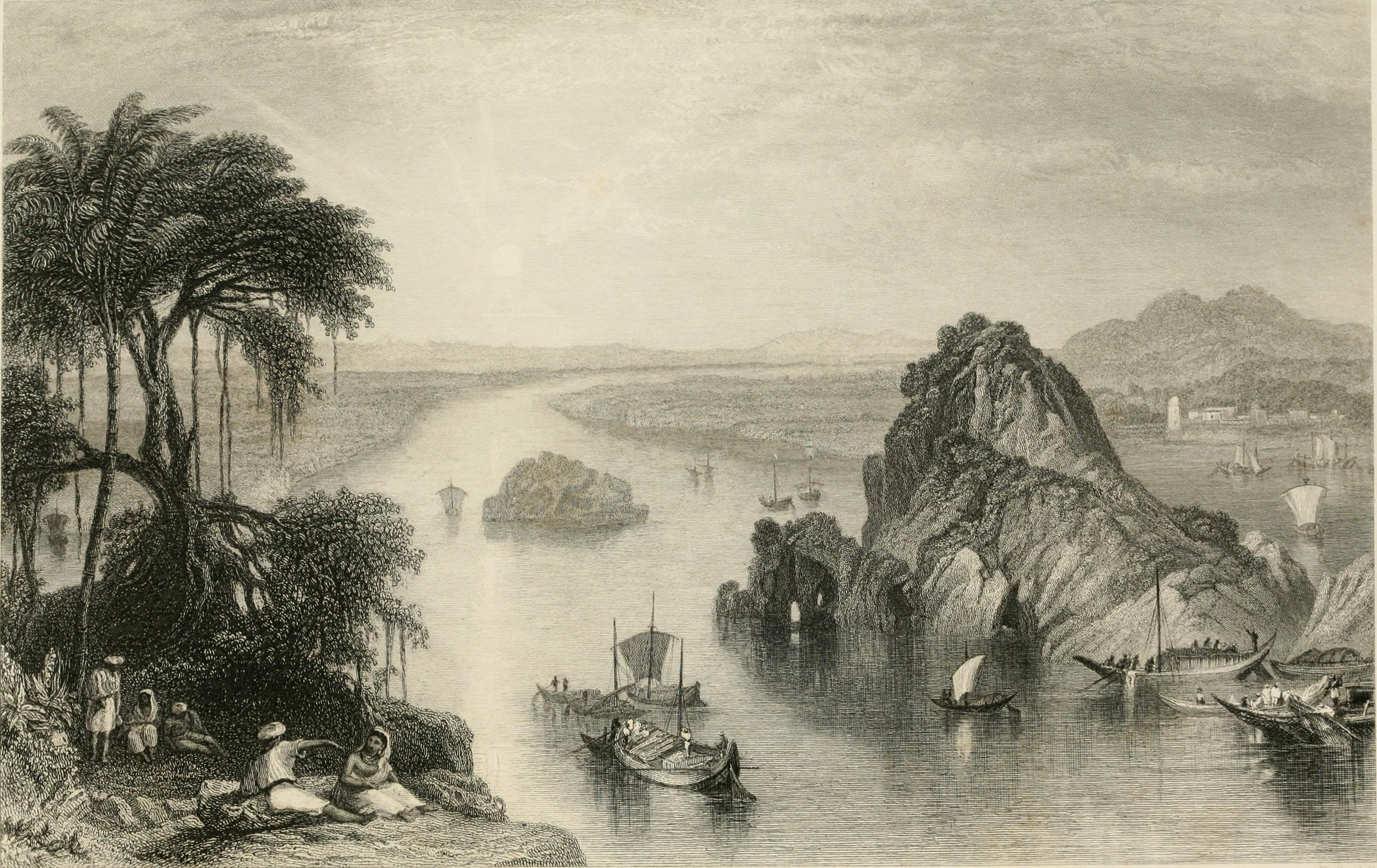

=== Medieval era ===
The university of Vikramashila served as one of the most important mahaviharas (centers of Buddhist learning) during the early medieval period in India, alongside Nalanda, Odantapuri and Somapura. The university was established by Dharmapala, who ruled the Pala Empire from 770–810 CE, in response to a perceived decline in the quality of scholarship at Nālandā.

Kahalgaon also houses the mausoleum of Ghiyasuddin Mahmud Shah, the last independent sultan of the erstwhile Bengal Sultanate, who died in the area a few days after his army was defeated by Sher Shah.

=== Modern era ===
S.S.V. College, a local degree college affiliated with Bhagalpur University, was established in Kahalgaon in 1969.

In 1985, the state-owned National Thermal Power Corporation established the Kahalgaon Super Thermal Power Station (KSTPS), a large coal-fired power station situated on the banks of the Ganges river. The station has a total power capacity of 2,340 megawatts, produced by processing coal mined from the Rajmahal coalfield in Jharkhand. The water supply for the plant is provided by the nearby Ganges river.

The electricity produced by KSTPS is distributed to localities located in the Indian states of West Bengal, Bihar, Jharkhand, Orissa, and Sikkim.

== Art and literature ==
In 1839, English Romantic painter J. M. W. Turner's Rocks at Colgong on the Ganges, depicting a "lonely tomb" situated on the banks of the Ganges river in Kahalgaon, was published as an engraving in Fisher's Drawing Room Scrap Book. Accompanying the engraving is a poetical illustration authored by English poet Letitia Elizabeth Landon.

== Demographics ==
Historical Population
Year	Pop.	±%
1872	5,239	—
1881	5,672	+8.3%
1891	5,145	−9.3%
1901	5,738	+11.5%
1911	4,297	−25.1%
1921	5,413	+26.0%
1931	5,233	−3.3%
1941	6,523	+24.7%
1951	7,515	+15.2%
1961	9,873	+31.4%
1971	10,543	+6.8%
1981	14,030	+33.1%
1991	17,899	+27.6%
2001	22,049	+23.2%
2011	33,700	+52.8%
Source: CENSUS OF INDIA, 1911. VOLUME V District Census Handbook

The 2011 census of India recorded a total population of 33,700 in the municipality of Kahalgaon. Of those, 17,952 are males while 15,748 are females. 5,221 residents, making up roughly 15.5% of the population, are under the age of 6 years. Within the town, the female-to-male sex ratio is 877, substantially less than the average figure of 918 across the state of Bihar. Among children, the child sex ratio is 922, compared to the state average of 935. The recorded literacy rate of Kahalgaon's residents is 76.81%, higher than the state average of 61.80%. The literacy rate is 81.64% among men and 71.26% among women.

A total of 6,315 households were recorded in Kahalgaon during the census. All recorded households within the municipality are under the aegis of the Kahalgaon Nagar Panchayat, and receive basic amenities including sewerage and running water.

=== Languages ===
Hindi, English, and Angika, a local dialect of Maithili, were recorded as the most commonly spoken languages in the municipality in the 2011 census.

=== Religion ===
According to the 2011 census, 80.15% of the population are adherents of Hinduism, while 19.64% of the population are followers of Islam.

== See also ==
- Vikramshila Gangetic Dolphin Sanctuary
- Vikramshila
- Bhagalpur Division
