= Bengaluru–Chennai Expressway =

Indian expressway connecting Bengaluru and Chennai

Bengaluru–Chennai Expressway

Route information
- Maintained by National Highways Authority of India (NHAI)
- Length: 258 km (160 mi)
- Existed: 9 December 2024 (Hoskote-Bethamangala); 2027 (full completion)–present

Major junctions
- West end: NH 75 / NH 648 in Hoskote, Bengaluru North district, Bengaluru Metropolitan Region, Karnataka
- East end: NH 48 in Sriperumbudur, Kanchipuram district, Chennai Metropolitan Area, Tamil Nadu

Location
- Country: India
- States: Karnataka; Andhra Pradesh; Tamil Nadu
- Districts: Bengaluru North district, Karnataka; Kolar district, Karnataka; Chittoor district, Andhra Pradesh; Ranipettai district, Tamil Nadu; Kanchipuram district, Tamil Nadu
- Towns: Hoskote, Bengaluru North district, Karnataka; Malur, Kolar district, Karnataka; Bangarapet, Kolar district, Karnataka; Kolar Gold Fields, Kolar district, Karnataka; Bethamangala, Kolar district, Karnataka; Venkatagirikota, Chittoor district, Andhra Pradesh; Palamaner, Chittoor district, Andhra Pradesh; Bangarupalem, Chittoor district, Andhra Pradesh; Chittoor, Chittoor district, Andhra Pradesh; Ranipet, Ranipettai district, Tamil Nadu; Walajapet, Ranipettai district, Tamil Nadu; Arakkonam, Ranipettai district, Tamil Nadu; Sriperumbudur, Kanchipuram district, Tamil Nadu

Highway system
- Roads in India; Expressways; National; State; Asian

The Bengaluru–Chennai Expressway, or National Expressway 7 (NE-7), is a partially operational 258 km (160 mi) long, four-lane (expandable to 8)-wide access-controlled expressway between two of the major metro cities of India, Bengaluru, the capital of Karnataka and Chennai, the capital of Tamil Nadu. It will run from Hoskote in Bengaluru Metropolitan Region to Sriperumbudur in Chennai Metropolitan Area. It will pass through three states-Karnataka, Andhra Pradesh and Tamil Nadu It allows vehicles to reach a maximum speed limit of 120 km/h (75 mph). The road was designated as a National Expressway on 1 January 2021. The total project value is around ₹17,930 crore (US$1.9 billion).

Construction on the expressway began after Prime Minister Narendra Modi laid the foundation stone for it in May 2022. and was supposed to finish by the latter half of 2023. However, due to land acquisition and funding issues, work progressed at a slow pace. Hence, its deadline was rescheduled to January 2024, then March 2024, and was changed again to the end of 2024. Finally, the 71 km (44 mi)-long Karnataka section of the expressway opened in December 2024, while the rest till Chennai is scheduled to be completed by 2027.

The expressway will bring significant socio-economic benefits and foster growth and development in Karnataka, Andhra Pradesh and Tamil Nadu, thus resulting in overall advantage to not only southern India, but also whole of the nation as one of the crucial economic corridors. The most direct benefit that the expressway will bring is the travel time and distance reduction, from the existing 7-8 hours and around 350 km to only 2-3 hours and 260 km. The regions adjoining the expressway will be developed as industrial areas and real estate hubs, serving as sources of massive employment, opportunities and trade, with the expressway serving as an important artery. Owing to its immense significance in linking the two major capitals of Bengaluru and Chennai, additional space in between the lanes has been reserved for future use, so that the expressway can be expanded progressively in three phases to cater more traffic. Initially, upon completion in August 2025, it will have four lanes. Then, it is estimated to be expanded to six lanes by 2037, and ultimately, to eight lanes by 2041, making it similar to the Delhi-Mumbai Expressway. Foreign investment and land prices have already been rapidly rising for both industrial and real estate activities in the three states, ever since the project was finalised in 2022. Notable places include Hoskote, the town where the expressway originates, Melpadi in Vellore district, Ponapanthangal in Ranipet district and Sriperumbudur, the ending point of the expressway, in Tamil Nadu, which will be major intersection points for transfers and projects. The Ranipet SIPCOT Estate has already received heavy investments from both domestic and foreign companies, such as Tata Motors' new vehicle manufacturing plant, to come up there by 2026-27.

== History ==
To bolster socio-economic growth and development, trade, investment, connectivity and tourism, the Ministry of Road Transport and Highways (MoRTH) introduced the idea of a direct expressway that would link two of the major metro cities of India, Bengaluru and Chennai, the capitals of Karnataka and Tamil Nadu in 2011. These two cities also have some of the busiest traffic circulations in the nation, in terms of all three common modes of transport-road, rail and air. This traffic is also rising rapidly as these two cities grow in terms of both population and development. Currently, the National Highways lying in between the two cities have become constrained today, and are catering to extra traffic more than their designs. Most of them could not be expanded as well any longer because of urbanisation and forest areas along them. These problems lead to increased risks of accidents and mishaps, making travel unsafe and unfit for future traffic. Hence, in order to mitigate these issues and solve everything for the future, along with promoting development especially in the regions, cities and towns lying between the two cities, this plan of an expressway came into light, at an initial cost of around ₹7,000 crore (US$730 million). However, despite including it in the National Highways Development Project (NHDP), nothing seriously was considered after 2011, because of land acquisition, funding and planning issues, until the plan was formally included in the Bharatmala Pariyojana in 2015. Then, land acquisition of 2,650 ha (6,500 acres) for the project began from December 2018, after it was announced in March 2014, and was concluded by January 2021, the same month when the project was declared as a National Expressway, numbered NE-7. The project was sanctioned under the 2020 Union Budget. Then, the bidding process was started by the National Highways Authority of India (NHAI) in November 2020, after segmenting the project into a total of 10 packages. In February 2021, the initial plan of making the expressway with eight lanes got reduced to four lanes, so that it could be developed in the future progressively based on traffic and demand. All bids were finalised with confirmed contractors by March 2021, and the deadline for completion was set to 2023. The foundation stone for the project was laid by Prime Minister Narendra Modi in May 2022, and construction officially began thereafter.

Due to some delays in between caused by land acquisition and funding hurdles, work progressed with a slow pace. The pace increased since 2023 after deadlines were fixed for completion by January 2024, March 2024 and lastly to the end of 2024, and due to a close watch kept by the MoRTH to track its progress. Work carried on at its best in the Karnataka section with sufficient speed, while the Andhra Pradesh and Tamil Nadu sections lagged comparatively. Henceforth, in July 2024, after inspection, the Union Minister of MoRTH, Nitin Gadkari, announced that the Karnataka section of the expressway would be finished before December 2024, and would be inaugurated by Prime Minister Narendra Modi, while the rest of the section till Chennai would be completed by August 2025. In November 2024, the Karnataka section was finished, with just finishing touches being done, and it was announced that it would be inaugurated by November-end. Finally, the 71 km (44 mi)-long section from Hoskote, the starting point, to Bethamangala in Karnataka formally opened for traffic on 9 December 2024, while its official inauguration is yet to be done, and the remaining stretch till Sriperumbudur, the ending point in Tamil Nadu, is on track to be opened by August 2025.

== Construction ==
The National Highways Authority of India (NHAI) has divided the construction work of the expressway into three phases, with a total of 10 construction packages, with another proposed package as the 11th package, which is planned to be extended till Maduravoyal in Chennai from its terminating point near Sriperumbudur, in order to connect the Chennai Port onward from Maduravoyal through the Chennai Port-Maduravoyal Expressway, by widening the existing stretch of National Highway 48 (NH-48) (formerly NH-4). It will be executed simultaneously by 6 construction companies. The following tables list the packages, their length, and their contractors.

=== Phase-1 ===
In the state of Karnataka

Sr. No	Package	Length in km	Contractor
1.	Hoskote–Malur	26.4	Dilip Buildcon
2.	Malur–Bangarapet	27.1	Dilip Buildcon
3.	Bangarapet–Bethamangala	17.5	KCC Buildcon

=== Phase-2 ===
In the state of Andhra Pradesh

Sr. No	Package	Length in km	Contractor
1.	Bethamangala–Baireddipalle	25.0	Montecarlo Construction
2.	Baireddipalle–Bangarupalem	31.0	Apco Infratech
3.	Bangarupalem–Gudipala	29.0	Dilip Buildcon

=== Phase-3 ===
In the state of Tamil Nadu

Sr. No	Package	Length in km	Contractor
1.	Gudipala–Walajapettai	24.0	Montecarlo Construction
2.	Walajapettai–Arakkonam	24.5	KCC Buildcon
3.	Arakkonam–Kanchipuram	25.5	DP Jain & Co.
4.	Kanchipuram–Sriperumbudur	32.1	Ramalingam Construction Co.

== Impact ==
The most significant impact the expressway will give is the drastic reduction in both travel time and distance between Bengaluru and Chennai, from the present 7-8 hours and 340-350 km to only 2-3 hours and 260 km, significantly helping commuters with the ease of travel and slashing road transport risks. This will lead to dramatic decline in carbon dioxide emissions, fuel consumption and pollution, mitigate traffic, increase speed, secure enhanced connectivity as a new direct and alternative traffic-free fast route, and promote environmental safety and sustainability. The expressway is being built with green spaces in between and on either sides of the road lanes, also with wildlife crossings through overbridges and underpasses to not let wildlife be negatively affected in any way. The project is also compensating with the green cover affected due to construction by planting new trees along its alignment.

Apart from a drastic jump in both foreign investment and real estate activities along the expressway, ever since the project was finalised in 2022, notable places that have attracted a significant share of these include Hoskote, the starting point of the expressway, Kolar, Chittoor, Arakkonam, Kanchipuram and Sriperumbudur, the ending point of the expressway. Overall, Tamil Nadu has attracted the most investments so far, other than Karnataka and Andhra Pradesh. Specifically, the major and renowned domestic and foreign companies that have invested along the expressway's route are Tata Motors, who has finalised to set up a ₹9,000 crore (US$930 million) car manufacturing plant in Ranipet SIPCOT Estate, which lies in Nemili Taluk of Ranipet district, close to the expressway and near to the Ponapanthangal-Panapakkam road or SH-127A. It will build luxury, sports, electric and conventional fuel cars, mostly for Jaguar Land Rover. This has resulted in dramatic land price increase of 25 times than before around the upcoming factory area. The plant will create over 5,000 jobs, manufacture over 250,000 initially and ultimately over 1 million units or cars annually and will be ready by the end of 2026. Another notable company is Hong Fu, a globally renowned Taiwanese shoe manufacturer that manufactures shoes and associated sportwear, footwear and travel accessories like bags for global brands, like Nike, Puma and Converse, who has invested over ₹1,000 crore (US$100 million) for a new footwear plant in the same SIPCOT area. It will create over 20,000 jobs, and will be ready there by 2028-29. Further future prospects are also on the anvil, with plans by more firms like Mahindra, Bajaj Auto and also Nissan to set up new plants along the expressway's alignment, making the three states one of the most attractive sources of employment, opportunities and trade for socio-economic progress and development of the entire nation, with the expressway acting as a crucial artery among other expressways.

== Bengaluru-Chennai Economic Corridor ==
The expressway is an integral core part of the larger and broader project of Bengaluru-Chennai Economic Corridor (BCEC), under which the project will act as a lifeblood towards promoting all other associated projects and developments in the regions lying between Bengaluru and Chennai, spread in the states of Karnataka, Andhra Pradesh and Tamil Nadu. The economic corridor is one of the many economic corridors (ECs) of India, that are being developed to promote nationwide infrastructure development and bring overall socio-economic prosperity, with expressways serving them as their arteries or core components as the driving force for building adjoining regions and places as new economic, industrial and special investment hubs.

== Future plans ==
It plans to expand to Mangaluru, becoming the Mangaluru-Bengaluru-Chennai expressway corridor, which will run parallel to NH 75 and NH 73, connecting two major ports. The route stretches from near Dobbaspet (on the Bengaluru Ring Road) to Bantwal (on the Mangaluru Ring Road), covering a length of approximately 240 to 275 kilometers. As the expressway is being built with additional space or a provision of expansion to cater to the future traffic, it will be expanded progressively from the current four lanes to six lanes by 2037, and ultimately to eight lanes by 2041, making it similar to the Delhi-Mumbai Expressway. To promote greater connectvity beyond the expressway's range, the Government of India has envisioned a Bengaluru–Mangaluru Expressway, by expanding the existing National Highway 275 (NH-275) from Mysuru to Mangaluru. A Mangaluru–Chennai Expressway through Bengaluru has also been proposed. Once this plan is realised, it will directly link Mangaluru with Chennai as a new economic corridor between the two cities, linking the western and eastern coasts together.

== Status updates ==
- Aug 2018: Land acquisition was announced to start soon.
- Dec 2018: ₹1,370 crores were already spent by the Government of India on pre-construction activities of this ₹17,930 crores expressway.
- Feb 2019: More than 60% of land required for 262 km expressway was now acquired. Work was announced to begin in six months. The deadline of the Expressway was set to 2023.
- Nov 2020: Acquisition of required 2,650 hectares of land was nearly done. Tenders were invited for 3 out of total 10 packages.
- Feb 2021: The expressway was later shortened to be 4 laned instead earlier planned 8 lanes. Dilip Buildcon Ltd declared lowest bidder for Package 1 (Hoskote - Malur) and Package 2 (Malur - Bangarapet).
- Sep 2021: Dilip Buildcon Ltd receives Letter of Agreement (LoA) from National Highways Authority of India (NHAI) for construction of the expressway.
- Jan 2023: The expressway will be completed by March 2024.
- Jan 2023: As of 26 January, around 15% work has been completed on the expressway.
- Nov 2024: 65% of work has been completed & entire work in Karnataka state side is completed. Entire work expected to be completed by August 2025.
- Dec 2024: The Karnataka section was opened, and the rest of the expressway is on track to be completed by August 2025.
- June 2026: A 25 km stretch was opened to traffic with the commissioning of the Bethamangala–Baireddypalle section, representing the first operational segment of the expressway in Andhra Pradesh. Completion of the remaining sections has been delayed until early 2027.

== See also ==
- Chennai Port–Maduravoyal Expressway
- Chittoor–Thatchur Expressway
- Bengaluru–Mysuru Infrastructure Corridor
- Expressways of India
- Bharatmala
- National Highways Development Project
- Delhi–Mumbai Expressway
