= New Zuari Bridge =

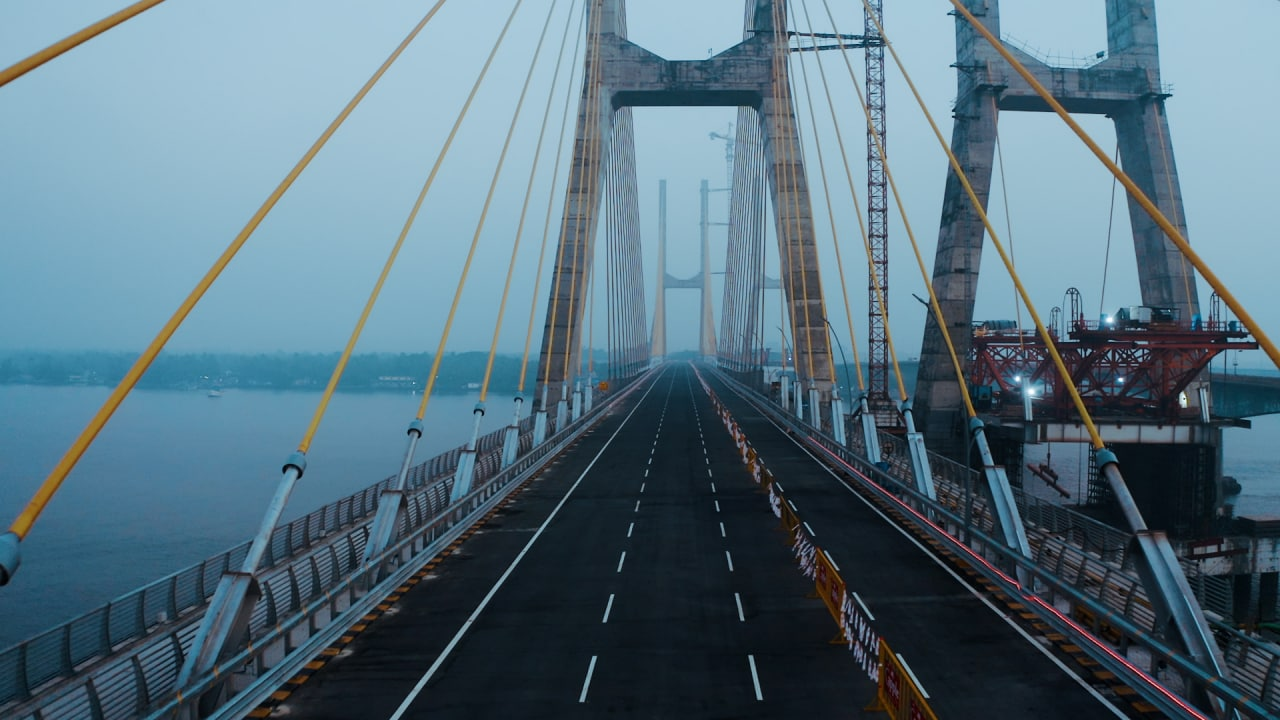
- The bridge, with its first section completed by Dilip Buildcon
- Coordinates: 15°24′42″N 73°54′22″E
- Carries: NH-66
- Crosses: Zuari River
- Locale: Tiswadi, Goa, India

Characteristics
- Design: Cable-stayed bridge
- Total length: 640 metres (2,100 ft)
- Width: 27 metres (89 ft)
- Longest span: 360 metres (1,180 ft)

History
- Constructed by: Dilip Buildcon
- Inaugurated: 29 December 2022; 3 years ago (Northbound carriageway); 22 December 2023; 2 years ago (Southbound carriageway)

Location
- Interactive map of New Zuari Bridge

New Zuari Bridge, also commonly known as Manohar Setu, is a bridge over the Zuari River in Goa, India, linking the districts of North Goa and South Goa.

Opened in 2022, with a total length of 640 metres (2,100 ft), New Zuari Bridge is the second longest cable-stayed bridge in India. Named after the Zuari River, the project was under the control of National Highways Authority of India (NHAI).

== History ==
The foundation stone of the bridge was laid in 2016. It was initially agreed that it would take three years to complete. Bhopal based Dilip Buildcon Limited was awarded the bridge construction project. Work on the country's second largest cable bridge started in collaboration with a Ukrainian firm. But the work progressed slowly. The construction of the bridge, which was supposed to be completed in 2021, was delayed due to the COVID-19 pandemic; because the pandemic situation prevented DBL's Chinese consultant from traveling to India. Union Road Transport and Highways Minister Nitin Gadkari inaugurated the first phase of the New Zuari Bridge in Goa on 29 December 2022. The 2nd (southbound) bridge was opened on 22 December 2023.

== Architectural features ==
New Zuari Bridge is a cable-stayed bridge, built using steel pylons 125 metres (410 ft) high. With a total length of 640 metres (2,100 ft), New Zuari Bridge is the second longest cable-stayed bridge in India. The total width of the bridge is 27 metres (89 ft), with 4 lanes in each direction. The deck over the main span is 360 metres (1,180 ft) long. The two side spans are supported by parallel wire cables and are 140 metres (460 ft) long.

== See also ==
- Atal Setu, Goa
- Zuari Bridge
