= Jewell water filter =

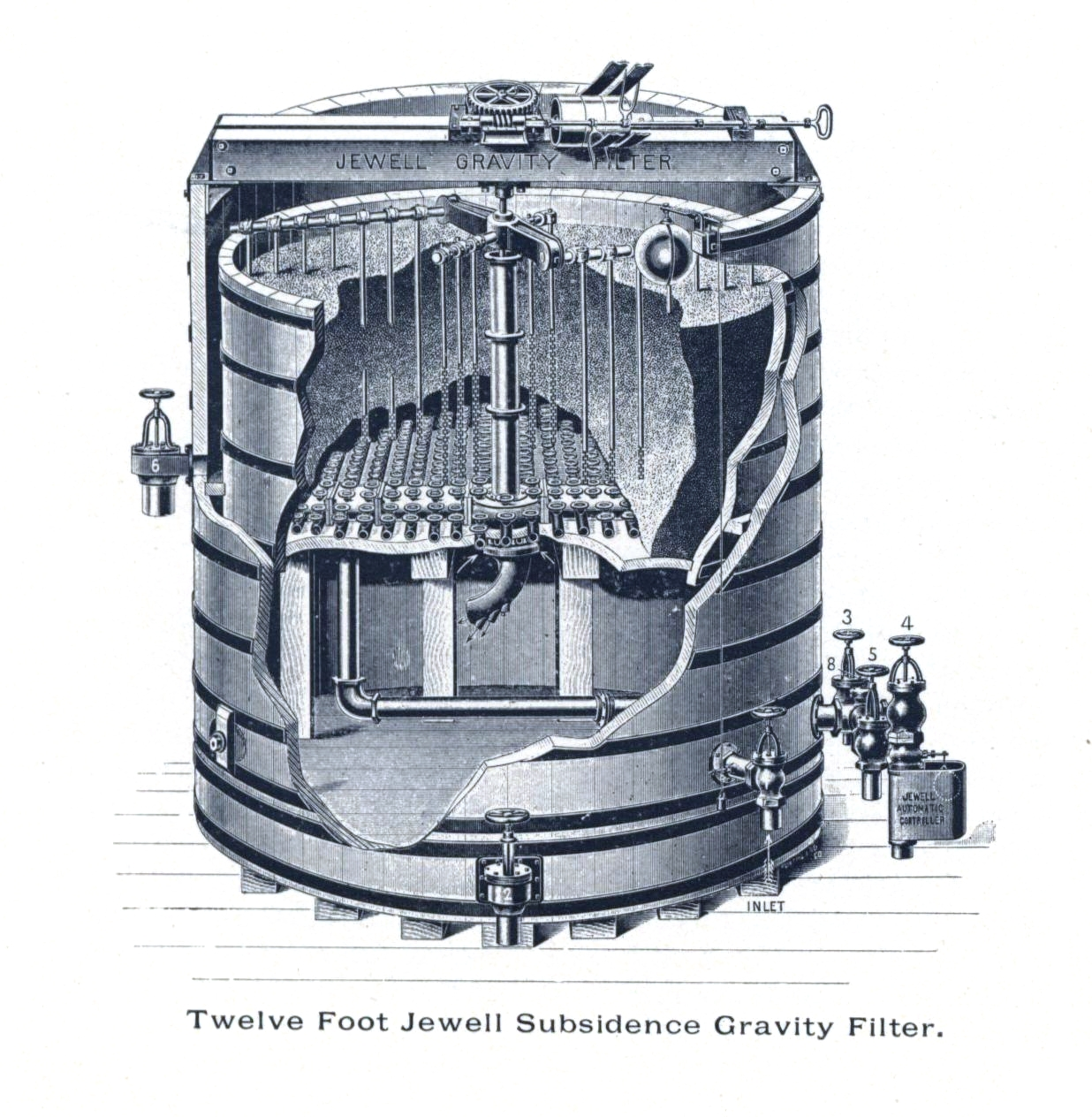
Cross section of 12 foot gravitational subsidence filter designed by Jewell

A Jewell water filter was a system of sand filters for filtering and treating water for drinking purposes that made use of gravity to allow water to percolate through a column of sand inside cylindrical cisterns that was widely used in the early twentieth century. They are named after Omar Hestrian Jewell (1 July 1842 - 19 June 1931) established Jewell Pure Water Company in Chicago in 1890 and managed later by two of his sons. Jewell water filters were used in many city water supply systems across the world and modified versions continue to be in use.

== History ==
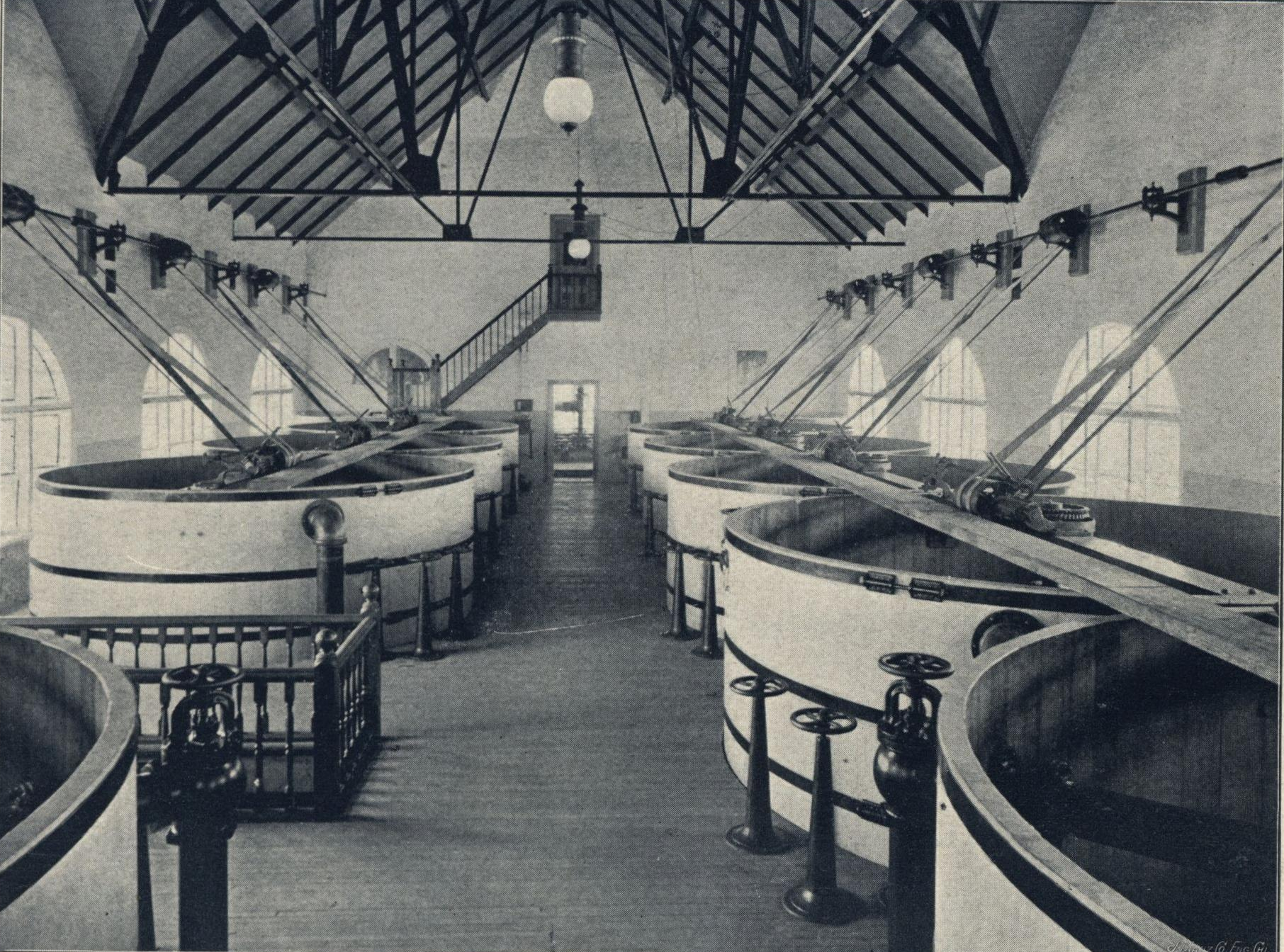
Upper level of a Jewell filter in use at Niagara in the late 1890s

Slow sand filters were introduced at a point when the nature of disease causing organisms in typhoid and cholera had been established. Omar Jewell was a mechanical engineer who designed farm equipment and he took an interest in solving some of the problems involved in the filtration of water and established the O.H.Jewell Filter Company and was financed by Chicago-based waterwork dealers James B. Clow and Sons. Omar's son William H. Jewell graduated in 1887 from the College of Pharmacy, University of Illinois and served as a chemist in the company. Another son, Ira worked for a while with the company but sold his stock in 1900 to start a breakaway company I.H. Jewell Filter Company.

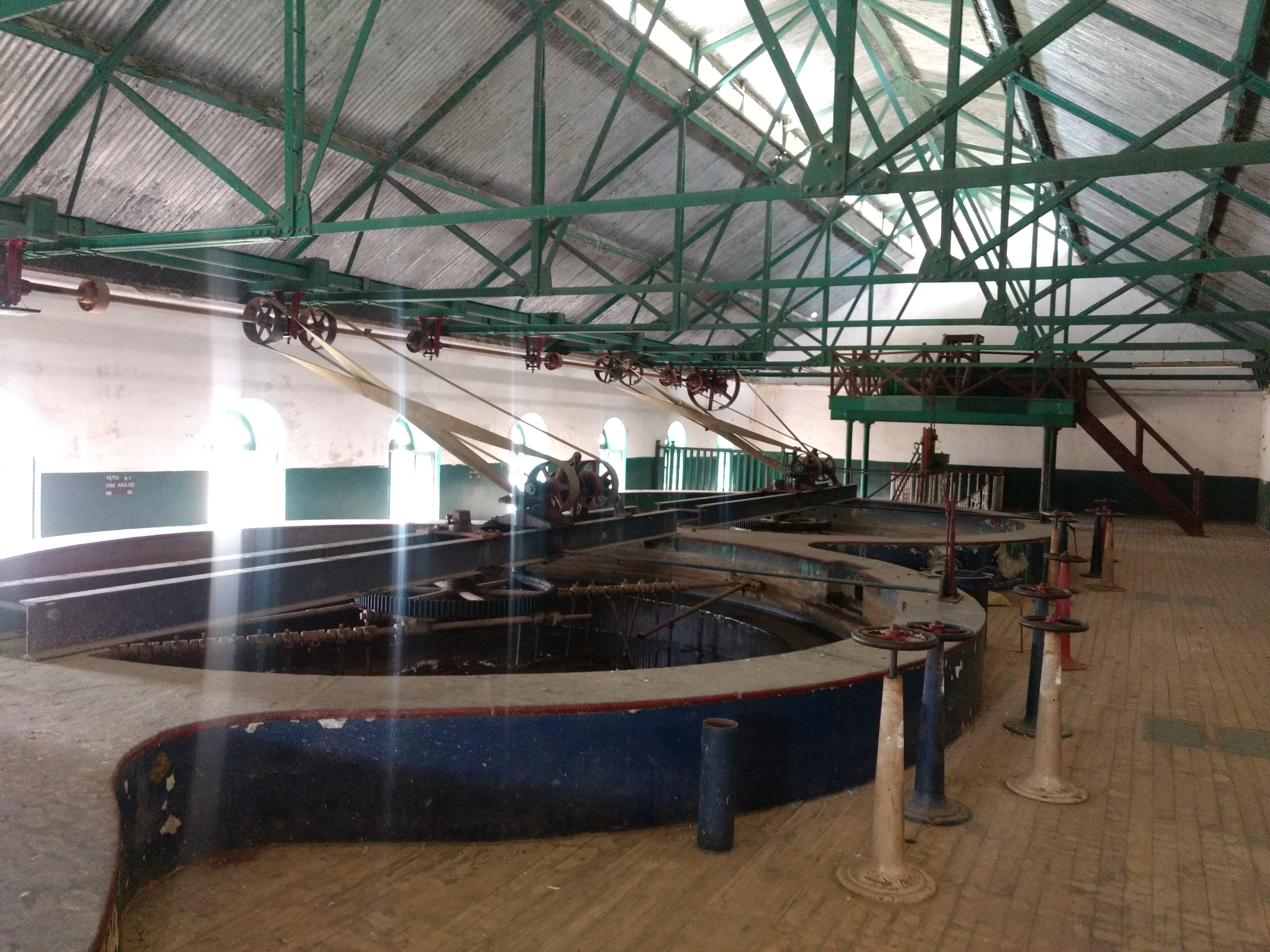
Upper section of the first Jewell filter installed in Bethamangala, India in 1903 (photo taken in 2018)

The first Jewell filters were built for use at Rock Island, Illinois in 1891. Jewell filters evolved over time to substitute open sand bed filters which had problems in the United States: freezing in winter and algal growth in summer introducing an odour to the water. Over time Omar and his sons owned several patents in water filtration, nearly 50 patents between 1888 and 1900, including novel systems for combining filtering and chlorination. By 1896 nearly 21 plants in the United States of America used Jewell filters. In 1898 the O.H.Jewell Filter Company settled a patent infringement claim over a coagulation process patented by Isaiah Smith Hyatt, brother of John Wesley Hyatt, in 1884 and owned by the New York Filter Manufacturing Company. Other filter companies came up during the period and there were numerous patent litigations and company mergers with Jewell merging with the New York Filter Manufacturing Company in 1900 to become the single major New York Continental Jewell Filtration Company. The resulting company owned the licenses to most of the valuable patents of the day and by 1909 they had nearly 360 plants in operation. Several were built in far away places like India with the largest being in Kolar at Bethamangala with a capacity of 2,000,000 gallons per day. The one in Warsaw was the largest in Europe in its time.

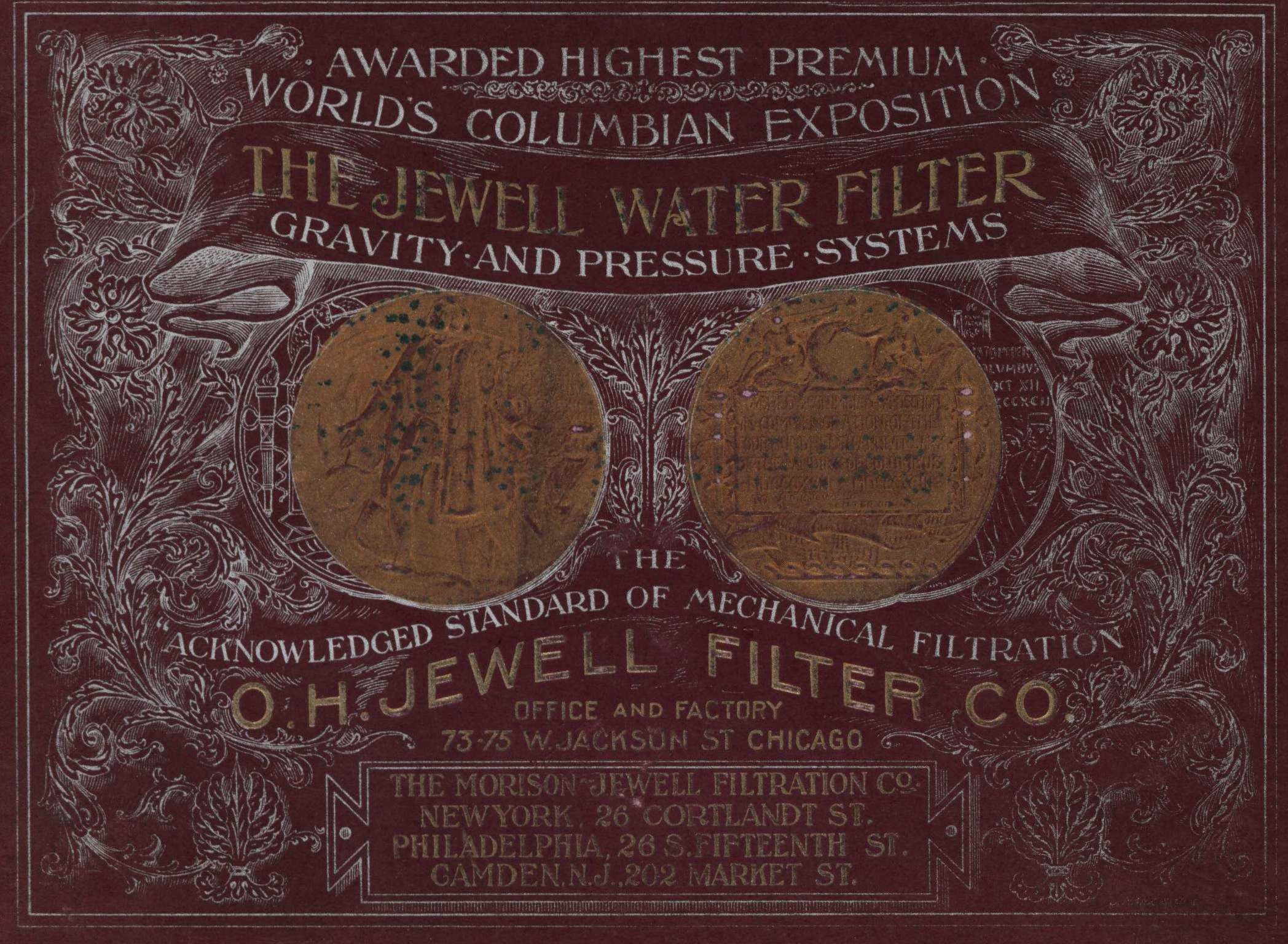
Jewell catalog (1897)

An outbreak of typhoid during the 1890s in the city of Pittsburgh led to calls for improved sanitation and improvements in the quality of drinking water supply. Pittsburgh Filtration Commission was established in June 1896 and it recommended in 1899 a slow-sand filtration system. Once this became operational, the cases of typhoid were greatly reduced. The Filtration commission wrote to several companies but only two agreed to enter the tests. These were the Cumberland manufacturing company and the Morison-Jewell Filtration Company and the committee experimented with a Warren filter and a Jewell filter. Jewell filters underwent further bacteriological tests in Alexandria and Berlin and their approval led to their wider adoption in numerous town water supplies in the early 1900s. The British troops at Alexandria brought down typhoid deaths to zero by 1905 with water treatments that included the use of Jewell filters. Jewell filters became commonplace in British Indian military towns in the plains after around 1910 and their construction had been standardized in engineering manuals.

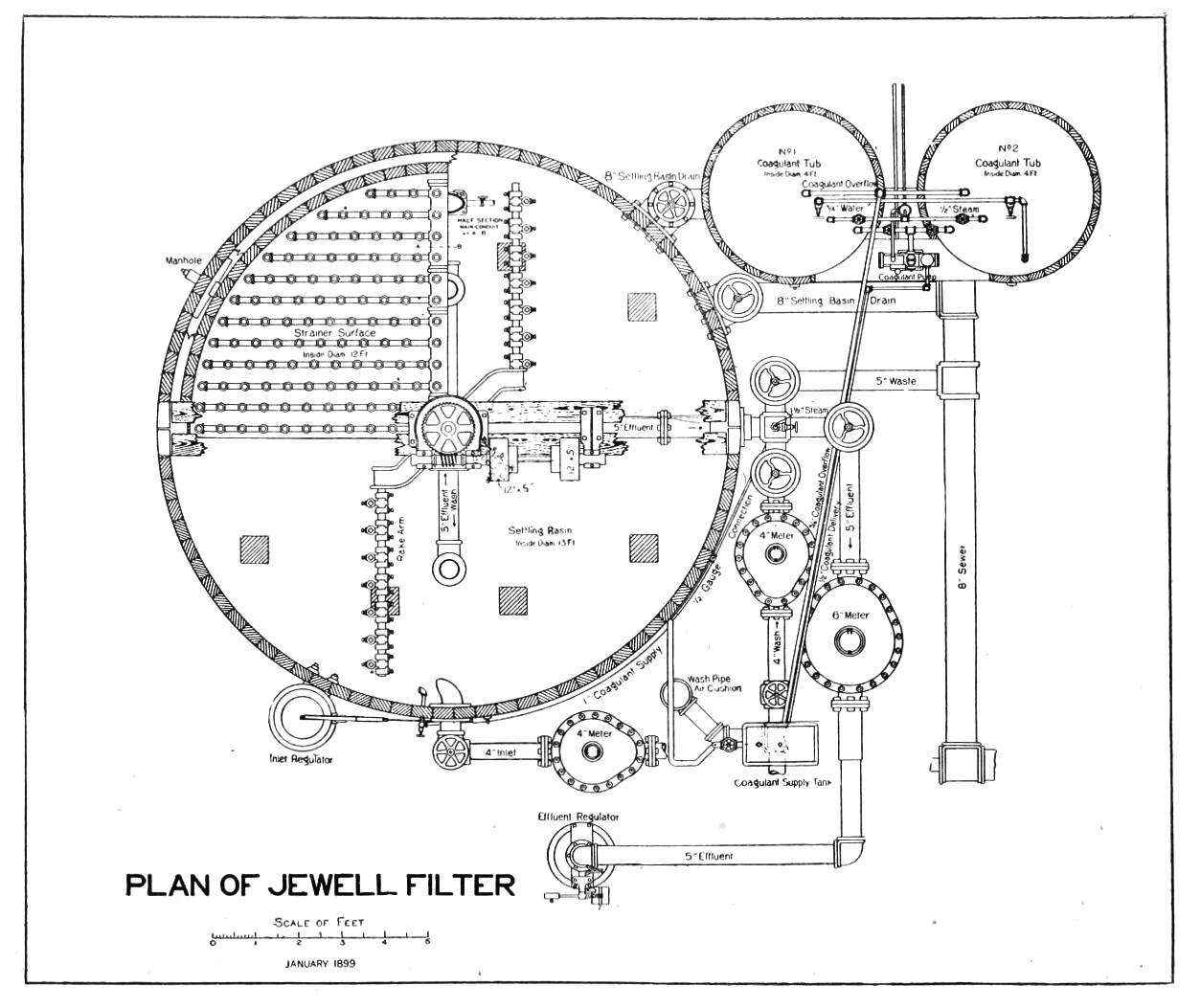
Plan view

== Construction and working ==
Jewell filters, unlike their predecessors, open sand filters, were housed indoors and included mechanical action to turn and wash the sand with their key advantages being their ability to work in winter and reduce bacterial counts. The water from a river or lake is first passed through sedimentation beds where a coagulant such as alum is added. The water then goes into the sand bed within cylinders of the Jewell filters and the coagulant forms a film on top of it. The sand beds are cleaned by stirring them with rotary arms and washing with water pumped at pressure from below. The Warren filter also had a similar system for washing sand. The design to carry away the wash effluent however differed between the Warren and Jewell filters. The system also included automatic control the flow of water inflow and devices to control the addition of chemicals such as lime and iron. The company later produced variations that used water under pressure than to merely rely on gravity.
