= Mogilivaripalli =

- Village
- Interactive map of Mogilivaripalli
- Location within Andhra Pradesh Location within India
- Coordinates: 13.1667°N 78.8593°E
- Country: India
- State: Andhra Pradesh
- District: Chittoor
- Mandal: Bangarupalem
- Gram panchayat: Mogilivaripalli
- Elevation: 305 m (1,001 ft)
- ISO 3166 code: IN-AP

Mogilivaripalli is a gram panchayat (village) in Bangarupalem mandal, Chittoor district, Andhra Pradesh, India.
