= Setteri =

Coordinates: 12°24′N 78°36′E

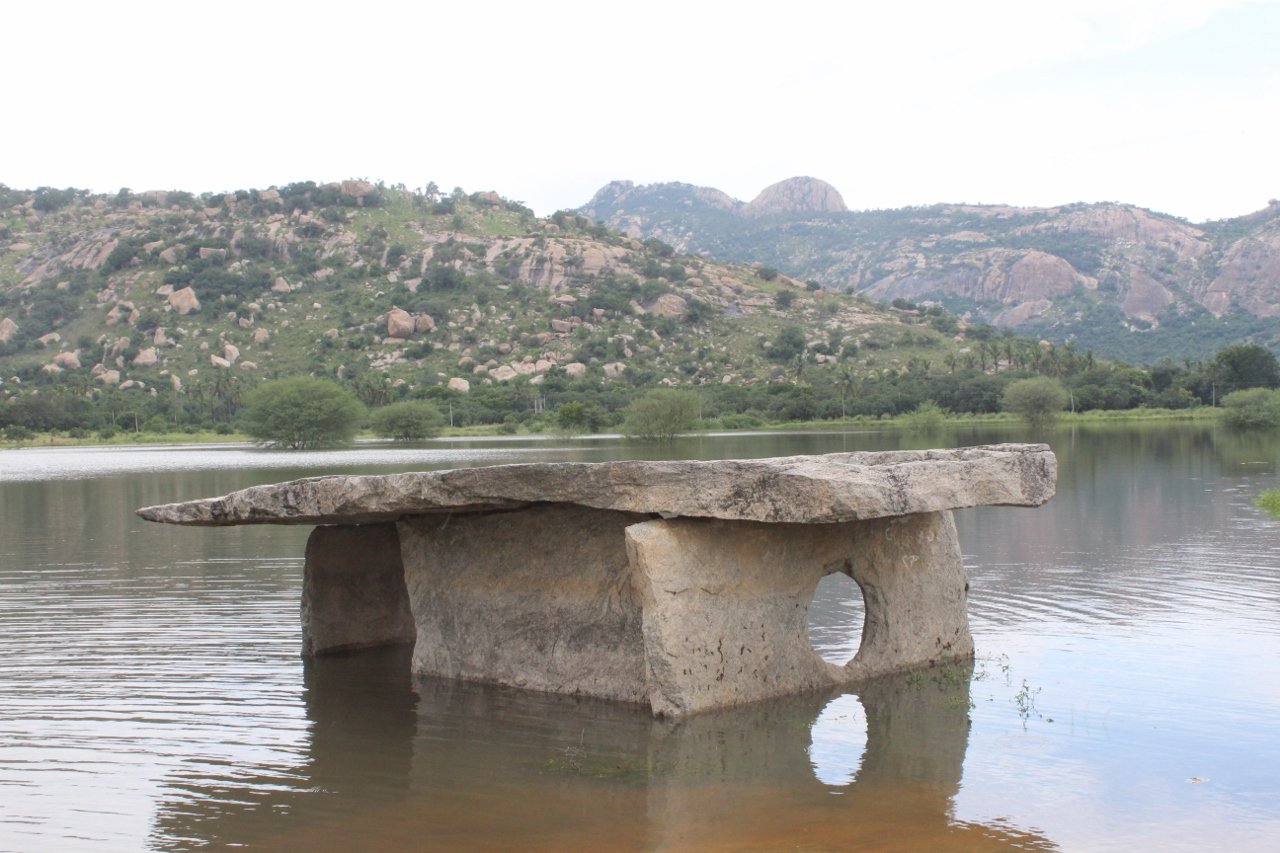
- Setteri Pond filled with water due to heavy rainfall in Nov 2015
- Interactive map of Setteri
- Location in Andhra Pradesh, India
- Country: India
- State: Andhra Pradesh
- District: Chittoor
- Mandal: Bangarupalem

Population (2012)
  - Total: 1,500

Languages
  - Official: Telugu
- Time zone: UTC+5:30 (IST)
- PIN: 517416
- STD code: 08573
- Nearest city: Bangalore, Chennai
- Lok Sabha constituency: Chittoor
- Vidhan Sabha constituency: Puthalapattu

Setteri is a village situated in the Bangarupalyam mandal of the Chittoor District in Andhra Pradesh. It is about fifteen km from Kanipakam. It enjoys a cool climate all over the calendar year with abundant water and natural resources.

== Geography ==
Setteri is located near to the main highway NH4 between Chennai and Bangalore, and almost exactly midway between the two cities. It is approximately 33 km from Chittoor and close to Tirupati, Tiruttani, Mogili, Kanipakam and Ardhagiri temples. Setteri is well known for green mango orchards, jaggery production, groundnuts and has several freshwater springs.

== Demographics ==
In the 2011 census, the population of Setteri was 1,275 people.
