= Sattuvanthangal =

- Country: India
- State: Tamil Nadu
- District: Tiruvannamalai

Population (2013)
  - Total: 3,288
- Time zone: UTC+5:30 (IST)
- Area code: 04182

Sattuvanthangal is an Indian panchayat village located in Cheyyar taluk of Thiruvannamalai district in the state of Tamil Nadu in India.

== Description ==
Sattuvanthangal is one of the 64 village panchayats under Vembakkam block. It is located on the Palar River. The village code for Sattuvanthangal is 04 and it falls under the Venbakkam Block (Block Code.13). The word "Sattuvanthangal" (also spelled as Sattuvanthangal) is derived from the Tamil phrase "Sakthi Vandhu Thangal", meaning "Goddess Shri Durgai Amman".

== Demographics ==
According to the 2001 census, the population of Sattuvanthangal was 3288 with a total of 998 households. The female to male ratio was 1:0.9. The literacy rate in the village was 69.77%.

== Public services ==
=== Post office ===
Sattuvanthangal village has Branch post office which comes under Ranipet (Head Office). The village shares the postal code "632511" along with five branch offices of Tiruvanamalai district and four other Branch offices in Vellore District.

=== Police station ===
Police station of Sattuvanthangal Village Panchayat is located in Cheyyar taluk. Sattuvanthangal has a police station in charge of a Sub-Inspector. The village along with nearby hamlet pudur come under the station's jurisdiction.
