= Bheemasamudra =

Bheemasamudra is a tiny town situated in Chitradurga district in Karnataka. It is an important town in Chitradurga district. It is situated off National Highway 4.

A small town Bheemasamudra in Chitradurga District as one of the major Business Centre of areca nut business which is being transported to various parts of our country and abroad for further conversion as several values added forms of areca nut.

Taluk Name : Chitradurga District : Chitradurga State : Karnataka Division : Bangalore Language : Kannada Time zone: IST (UTC+5:30) Telephone Code / Std Code: 08194 Pin Code : 577520 Post Office Name : Bheemasamudra correct Pin Code,
