= Paminivandlavooru =

Paminivandlavooru Mittoor
- village
- Interactive map of Paminivandlavooru
- Location in Andhra Pradesh, India
- Coordinates: 13.2218°N 79.0054°E
- Country: India
- State: Andhra Pradesh
- District: Chittor

Population
  - Total: 400

Languages
  - Official: Telugu
- Time zone: UTC+5:30 (IST)
- PIN: 516417
- Nearest city: Chittoor
- Sex ratio: Male 60 Female 40 ♂/♀
- Literacy: 75%
- Lok Sabha constituency: Chittoor
- Vidhan Sabha constituency: Poothal pattu

Paminivandlavooru is a village in Mangalapalle Panchayat which is located in Bangarupalem mandal belonging to Chittoor district of Andhra Pradesh state in southern India.
