= Palar River =

River in southern India

Coordinates: 12°28′04″N 80°09′16″E

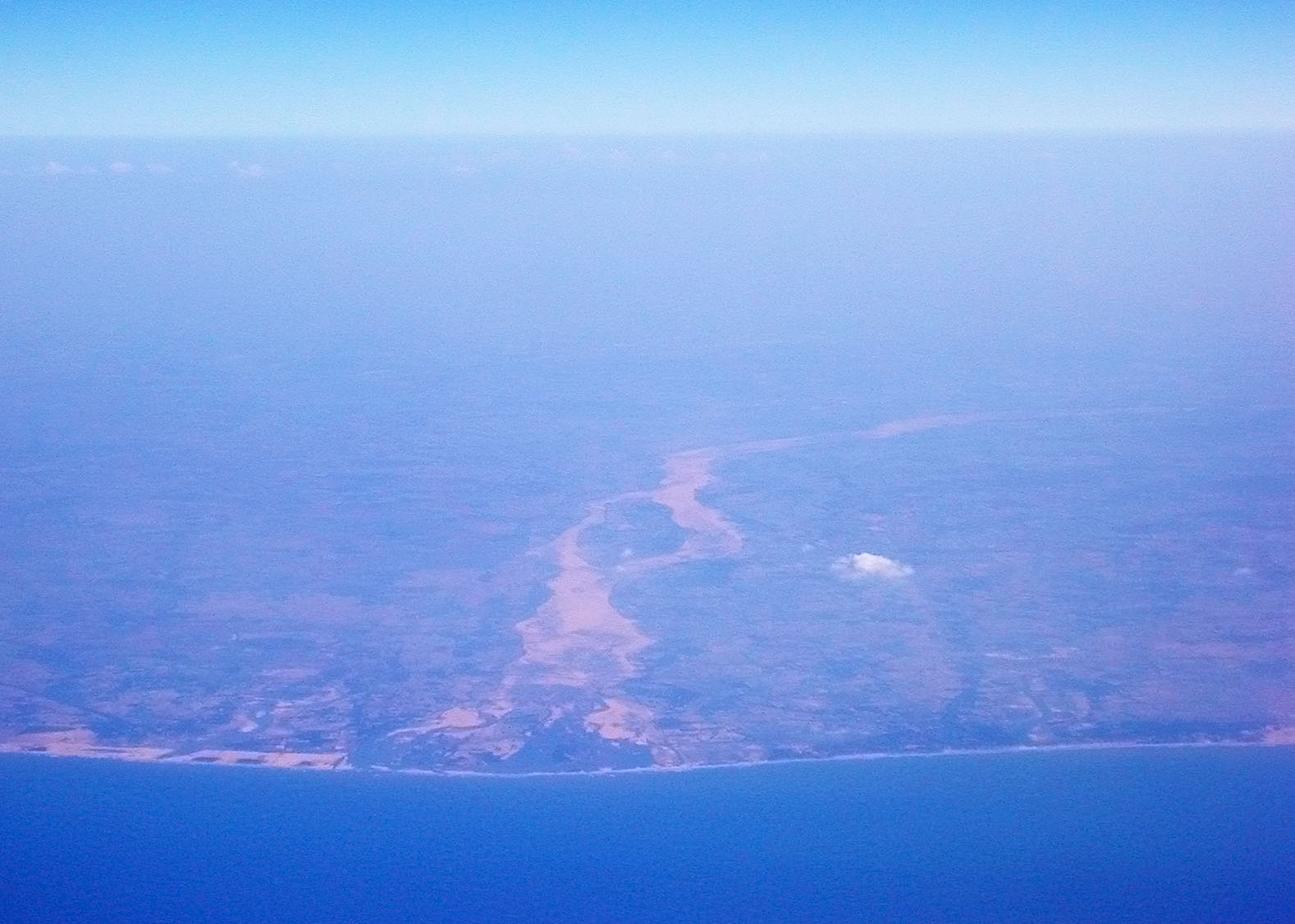
- Aerial view of the mouth of the Palar River

Location
- Country: India
- States: Karnataka, Andhra Pradesh, Tamil Nadu

Physical characteristics
- Source: near Nandi Hills
  - location: Chintamani taluk, Chikkaballapur district, Karnataka
  - elevation: 900 m (3,000 ft)
- Mouth: Bay of Bengal
  - location: between Vayalur and Kadalur, Chengalpattu district, Tamil Nadu
- Length: 348 km (216 mi)
- Basin size: 17,711 km^{2} (6,838 sq mi)

Basin features
- Cities: KGF (elev. 845 m), Vaniyambadi (351 m), Ambur (316 m), Vellore (220 m), Arcot (164 m), Ranipet (172 m), Walajabad (60 m), Chengalpattu (36 m)

The Palar (Tamil: பாலாறு pālāṟu [ˈpaːlaːɾu], literally "milk river") is a river of southern India. It rises in the Nandi Hills in Chikkaballapura district of Karnataka state, and flows 93 kilometres (58 mi) in Karnataka, 33 kilometres (21 mi) in Andhra Pradesh and 222 kilometres (138 mi) in Tamil Nadu before reaching its confluence into the Bay of Bengal at Vayalur about 75 kilometres (47 mi) south of Chennai. It flows as an underground river for a long distance only to emerge near Bethamangala town, from where, gathering water and speed, it flows eastward down the Deccan Plateau. The Towns of Bethamangala, Santhipuram, Kuppam, Mottur, Ramanaickenpet, Vaniyambadi, Ambur, Melpatti, Gudiyatham, Pallikonda, Anpoondi, Melmonavoor, Vellore, Katpadi, Melvisharam, Arcot, Ranipet, Walajapet, Kanchipuram, Walajabad, Chengalpattu, Kalpakkam, and Lattur are located on the banks of the Palar River. Of the seven tributaries, the chief tributary is the Cheyyar River.

Palar river water from Palar anicut is diverted to the Poondi reservoir located in the Kosasthalaiyar River basin and to Chembarambakkam Lake located in the Adayar River basin. These two reservoirs are major water supply points to Chennai city. After commissioning of the Telugu Ganga project to supply nearly 1,000,000,000 litres (260,000,000 US gal) per day of Krishna River water to the Chennai city, the dependence on Palar river water has reduced drastically.

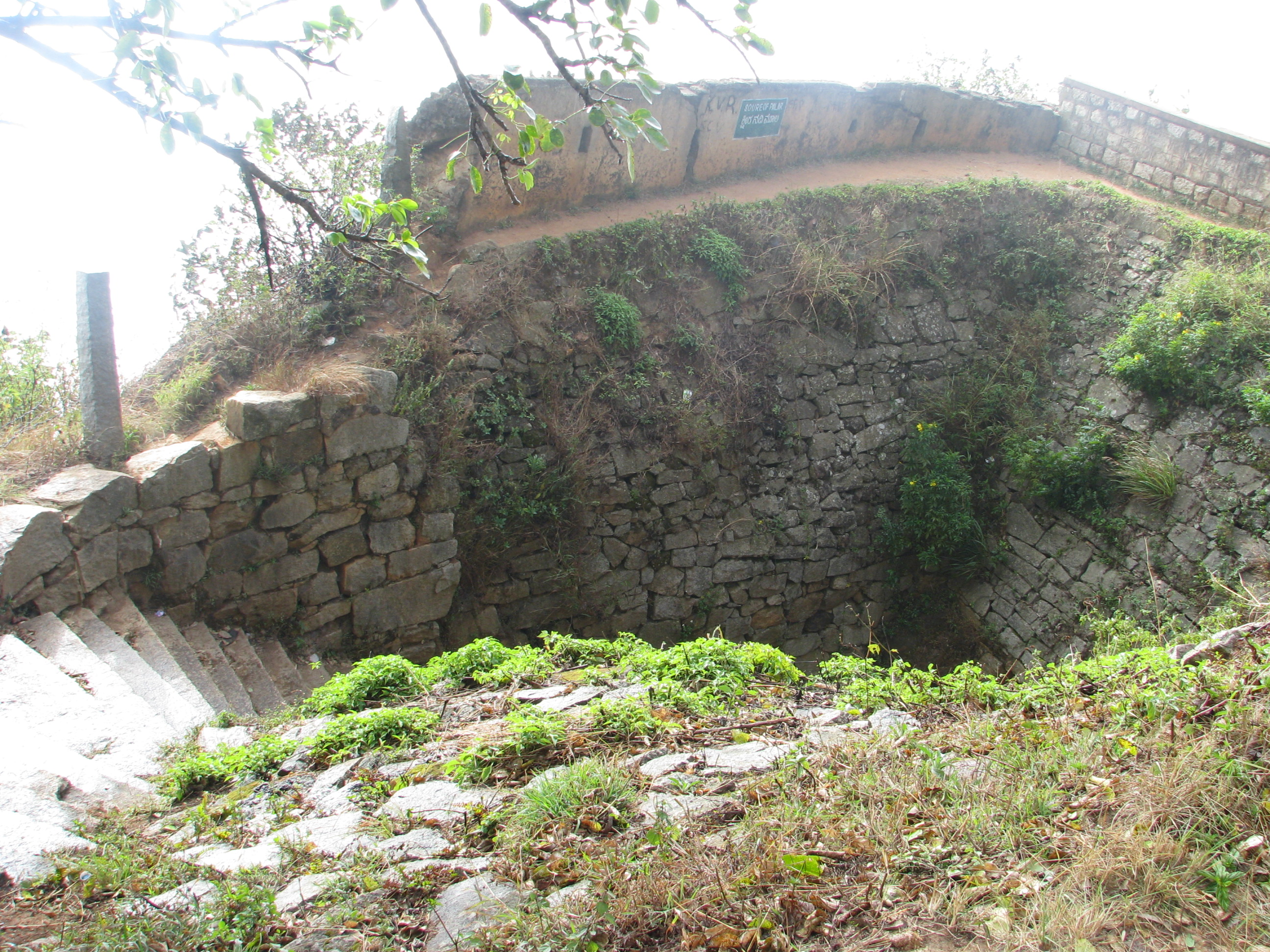
Source of the Palar in the Nandi Hills

== Controversial dam ==
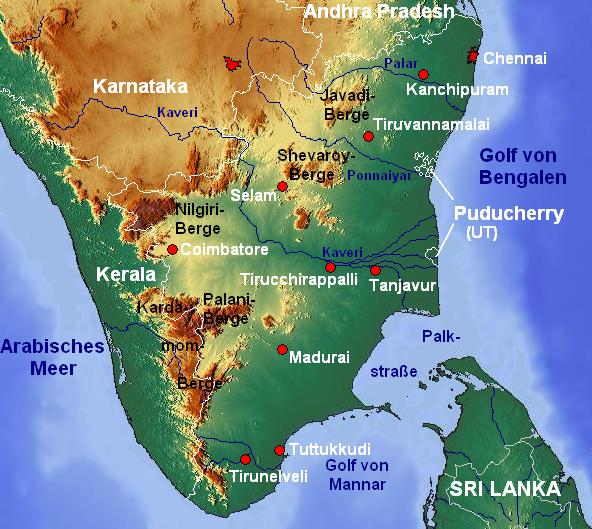
Map showing the river

The Andhra Pradesh Government is constructing an irrigation dam across the Palar river at Ganeshpuram, near Kuppam, Andhra Pradesh which has caused agitation among the people of the five northern districts of Tamil Nadu, namely Vellore, Kancheepuram, Tiruvannamalai, Chengalpattu, Thiruvallur and Chennai benefitted by the river. Tamil Nadu's former Chief Minister Jayalalitha voiced her opposition to this proposal and said "Palar is an inter-state river and was also one of the rivers mentioned in Schedule A annexed to the 1892 agreement which is in force as per Interstate River Water Disputes Act 1956. As per a clause of the agreement, the upstream state should not build any new dam or any structure to obstruct, divert, or store waters of the rivers without the consent of the downstream state".

The average rainfall in the entire Palar river basin is low. This river basin suffers from frequent droughts and there has been no full scale flow for the past 10 years. However, Karnataka and Tamil Nadu have mitigated the frequent recurrence of droughts by building numerous minor and medium irrigation tanks. This has improved the availability of water for surface as well as ground water irrigation. As per the wet land atlas of India., the manmade wet lands are covering extensive area (3% to 5%) in the districts of Karnataka and Tamil Nadu covering Palar river basin. Whereas the Palar basin in Andhra Pradesh is not well covered by wet lands which implies that the river water usage in Andhra Pradesh is not up to the mark compared to Karnataka and Tamil Nadu. In the year 1892 when the Palar waters agreement was made, Tamil Nadu and Andhra Pradesh were part of then Madras Presidency. The 1892 agreement on Palar river water sharing is applicable between Karnataka and Andhra Pradesh since the boundary line in Palar river basin between Madras Presidency and Mysore kingdom is now part of Karnataka and Andhra Pradesh states.

== Documentary ==
A documentary called En Peyar Palar produced by Social Action Movement and Water Rights Protection Group, Chengalpattu and released on 30 June 2008 chronicles the plight of the river from its origin in Karnataka till it joins Bay of Bengal. The 85-minute documentary delves into how activities such as sand quarrying and discharge of industrial effluents are sucking the life out of one of Tamil Nadu's prime sources of drinking water. It was directed by R.R. Srinivasan.

This river is so important for irrigation in the north and south Arcot districts of Tamil Nadu, but it flows a meager distance of 50 kilometres (31 mi) in Andhra Pradesh, where the Palar river had been seen dry for almost 20 years. Palar has been home for mud robbery and other illegal activities.

== Karnataka ==
In the State of Karnataka Palar River Originates from s Agrahara lake(kolar district of Karnataka). There are various reservoirs and check dams across the river to store the Water, While two of the most significant of them are the two Consecutive dams that are back to back with in seven Kilometers. The reservoir of Bethamangala and The Reservoir of the Ramasagara also called as Bukkasagara. The reservoir of Bethamangala had been the main source of Drinking water to the Kolar Gold Fields. And it is also a Boating area. While the second one and the largest of all reservoirs is the reservoir of the Ramasagara, which holds numerous temples at this spot. It is known famous for its fisheries till the year 2005. after which the Reservoir never got filled more than 40 percent of its capacity. The period from 2006 to the year of 2017 September the fate of the Palar river in this part was almost dry. The heavy rains in the hinterland and the basin of the palar river has brought the Bethamangala Reservoir back to its past glory, as of 6 October 2017 the Reservoir of Bethamangala is one feet deficit to its full capacity, while later Ramasagara Reservoir is just 15 percent filled and mostly dry, holds double the capacity of the former.

A few famous places like the Avani, Bangaru tirupati, Vijeyendra Swamy Temple, Someshwara Swamy temple, lies in these region, with in twenty kilometers of the epicentre Bethamangala.

== Towns around the river ==
Kaliappettai is located on the banks of the river. The town of Bethamangala, village of Ramasagara, Bangaru Tirupati (Guttahalli) is also located on its banks. This region also consists of two reservoirs, one at Bethamangala and the largest in Karnataka at the Ramasagara.

== See also ==
- Krishna Water Disputes Tribunal
- Penner River
- Tungabhadra Dam
- The Palar Challenge
