= Rendadi =

- village
- Location of Rendadi in Tamil Nadu, India
- Coordinates: 13°03′28″N 79°22′22″E
- Country: India
- State: Tamil Nadu
- District: Vellore
- Talukas: Walajapet

Languages
- Time zone: UTC+5:30 (IST)
- Postal code: 631102

Rendadi is a village in Vellore district in the Indian state of Tamil Nadu.
