= Zuari Bridge =

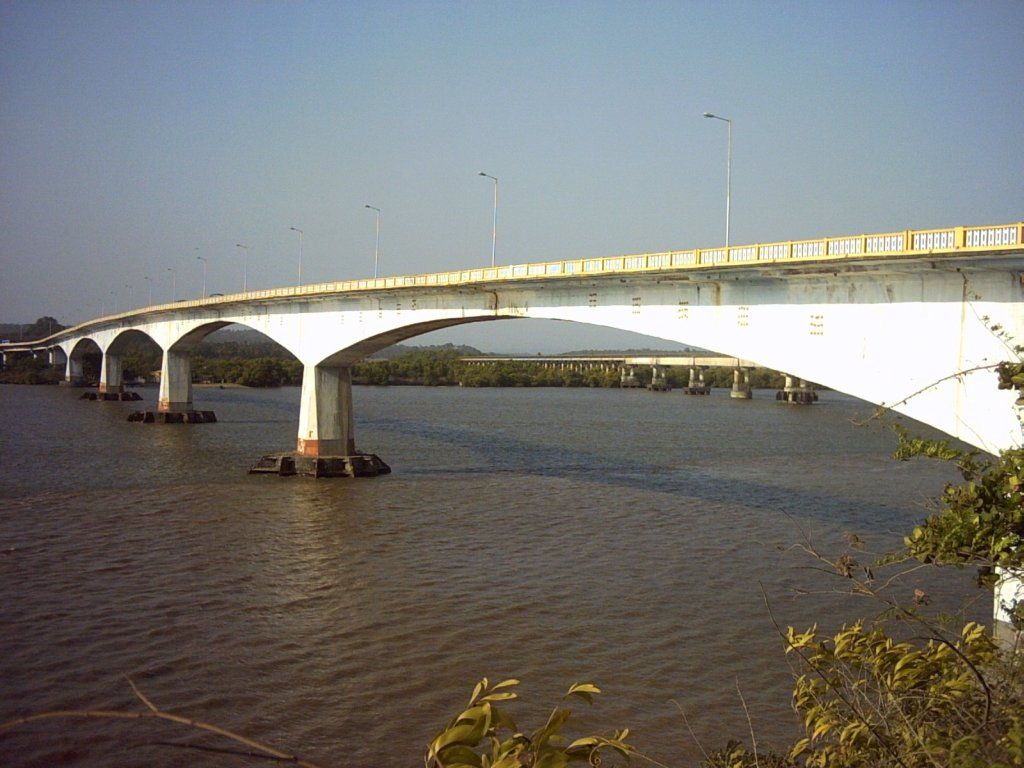
- Coordinates: 15°24′43″N 73°54′25″E
- Carries: NH 66
- Crosses: Zuari River
- Locale: Tiswadi, Goa, India

Characteristics
- Total length: 1,225 metres (4,019 ft)

History
- Constructed by: Dilip Buildcon

The Zuari Bridge is a bridge between North Goa and South Goa, India. It carries the NH 66 over the tidal part of the Zuari River, between the villages of Agaçaim and Cortalim. It is a few metres downstream of the Konkan Railway Bridge.

The bridge is 1,225 metres (4,019 ft) long.

== Konkan Railway Bridge ==
Konkan Railway Bridge
- Coordinates: 15°24′42″N 73°54′32″E
- Carries: Konkan Railway
- Crosses: Zuari River
- Locale: Tiswadi, Goa, India
- Other name(s): Zuari Bridge

Characteristics
- Total length: 1,319 metres (4,327 ft)

The Konkan Railway Bridge is a railway bridge between North Goa and South Goa, India. It carries the Konkan Railway over the tidal part of the Zuari River, south of Karmali railway station. The bridge was completed in three years. It is a few metres upstream of the Zuari road bridge.

The bridge is 1,319 metres (4,327 ft) long.

== Incidents on Zuari Bridge ==
In 2022, a car fell off the bridge killing all 4 occupants. Demands for the audit of the bridge safety were made by the local politicians. Aam Aadmi Party, Goa president Amit Palekar, blamed the depression near the gap between the bridge spans near the site of the accident as the cause. He demanded the bridge to be repaired.

== The New Zuari Bridge ==
This is an underconstruction cable-stayed bridge over Zuari River on the Panaji–Margao stretch of the National Highway 66.It is being built by Dilip Buildcon and was partially opened for public in 2022.

This New Zuari Bridge has eight lanes (4+4). It has dual carriageways of 27 m each and has a center median of 10.7m. It is the 2nd longest and widest cable-stay bridge in India behind Bandra–Worli Sea Link

This bridge is used as an expressway between Panaji and Margao, over the Zuari river. The main bridge over the Zuari river is 640m long. And the approach roads for this bridge cover over 13 km, starting from near the Bambolim cross in North Goa to near Birla cross in South Goa.

It is expected that two towers (110 m high from water level) will be built on this bridge. It is also expected that there will be an observatory and viewing gallery, an art gallery, and also a revolving restaurant.

Right-hand side (4-lane corridor) of the bridge thrown open for Vehicular traffic by Nitin Gadkari in December 2022.

== See also ==
- Atal Setu, Goa
- Zuari River
