= Venugopalaswami Temple, Kaliappettai =

Coordinates: 12.72°N 79.92°E

Venugopalaswamy Temple is a Hindu temple located in the village of Kaliappettai in the Kanchipuram district of Tamil Nadu, India. The temple is dedicated to Krishna.

== History ==
Kaliappettai was founded as an agraharam village, Doddacharpuram, in the 17th century AD. It is located on the banks of the Palar River.
