= Walajapet Kasiviswanathar Temple =

- Kasiviswanathar Temple, Walajapet, Ranipet, Tamil Nadu

Religion
- Affiliation: Hinduism
- District: Ranipet
- Deity: Kasiviswanathar
- Festivals: Maha Shivaratri, Chithirai Thiruvonam, Yearly abhishekh

Location
- Location: Walajapet
- State: Tamil Nadu
- Country: India
- Coordinates: 12°55′32.9″N 79°21′34.9″E

Architecture
- Type: Dravidian architecture

Specifications
- Temple: One
- Elevation: 175.69 m (576 ft)

Kasiviswanathar Temple is a historical Hindu temple dedicated to Lord Shiva, situated in Walajapet neighbourhood, Ranipet in the state of Tamil Nadu in the peninsular India. This temple is built around 300 years ago.

== Location ==
This temple is located at an altitude of about 175.69 metres (576.4 ft) with the geographic coordinates of (12°55′32.9″N 79°21′34.9″E) in Walajapet.

== Deities ==
The main deity of this temple is Kasiviswanathar and the Goddess is Kasivisalakshi. Maha Vishnu, Brahma, Durga, Rishabarudar, Shiv lingam, Nandi, Parvathavardhini, Dakshinamurthy, Ardhanareeswarar, Vinayagar, Pallhani Andavar, Subrahmanya with consorts Valli and Devasena, Sun, Moon, Thirunavukkarasar, Sundarar, Sambandar, Manikkavacakar, 63 Nayanmars, Bhairava, Nagas, Chandikeswarar, Saneeswarar are the other deities in this temple.

== Maintenance ==
This temple is maintained under the control of Hindu Religious and Charitable Endowments Department, Government of Tamil Nadu.
