= The Palar Challenge =

Annual off-road motor race

- Category: Offroading
- Country: India (2006 – present)
- Inaugural season: 2006
- Official website: http://terratigers.in

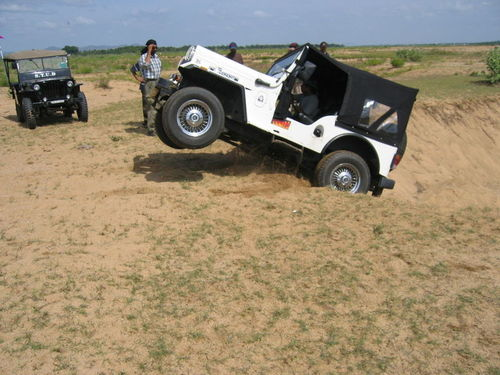
A participant tackling a sand pit in the challenge

The Palar Challenge (TPC) is an annual team-based off-road motor race, taking place in South India since 2006.

== The event ==
The event is an annual team-based off-road competition held around the Independence Day weekend. Each team consists of three vehicles and six competitors.

The first event was flagged off with around 21 members of the Jeep Thrills community. Today, the event has gained national prominence with entries pouring in from across the country.

Over the last couple of years, the event has seen international off-road drivers of repute competing with the best Indian off-roaders. It has been acknowledged as the toughest off-road competition in India.

== The terrain ==
The Palar River is a subterranean river that runs across South India. With its source in the Nandi Hills in Karnataka, the river traverses three different states over a distance of 350 km to meet the Bay of Bengal near Kalpakkam in Tamil Nadu. The terrain is a mix of water, sand, slush, boulders, rocks and rubble that offers excellent opportunities to set up challenging competitive Off-Road Special Stages.

== The organizing team ==
The Palar Challenge is organized by Terra Tigers, India's oldest and most widely recognized recreational off-road group. Started by a group of off-road enthusiasts a decade ago, today it has grown rapidly with national participation to be the benchmark for off-road motor-sports in India.

With competition experience across international events like RFC (Malaysia), Taprobana Challenge (Sri Lanka) amongst others, the team has been successfully organizing The Palar Challenge which is the premier national off-road competition in the country for over 7 years now.

== The challenge ==
The event tests teams for their proficiency in:

1. Team work and endurance
2. Off-road and cross country driving skills
3. Navigational abilities
4. Vehicle recovery techniques
5. Vehicle preparation

All competing vehicles are subjected to strict scrutiny to ensure that they adhere to the safety requirements prescribed in the competition handbook. Safety is regarded as of the utmost importance.

All organizers undergo a focused training schedule lasting over six months to ensure that every marshal is skilled in various off-road techniques.

== Event schedule ==
The event is spread across four days on a mix of rocks, slush, sand and gravel over carefully planned obstacles. This is to ensure that the level of competition is very high and for competitors to ensure that they change their driving pattern based on sudden changes in terrain.

== TPC over the years ==
- TPC 2006 – Was the introductory phase where the event was a cross country drive through the sandy Palar riverbed.
- TPC 2007 – The concept of Special Stages Driving and Technical SS like Tyre Changing without a jack or lifting device, Vehicle Recovery without a winch was tested in TPC 2007.
- TPC 2008 – The full competition was spread over 2 days.
- TPC 2009 – Drivers from Sri Lanka with International 4WD Competition experience competed, giving the Organizer and very good exposure to International 4WD Competition like the RFC Malaysia, and Taprobana Challenge; Sri Lanka
- TPC 2010 – There was a significant increase in the number of participants, and the Indo-Sri Lankan Team, SARA EXTREME 4x4 and B.O.D.A teams made a huge impact on the competition and its conduct.
- TPC 2011 – Was a new development in TPC, with a large number of teams, a multiple start-line and finish lines were used in rotation, ensuring most of competitors were able to attempt a maximum number of Special Stages.
- TPC 2012 – The Multiple Starts were further refined, and a 4 SS prologue was conducted.
- TPC 2013 – The event increased in size to 3 full days of off-road competition, over a variety of terrain to make it more interesting.
