= Sand filter =

Water filtration device

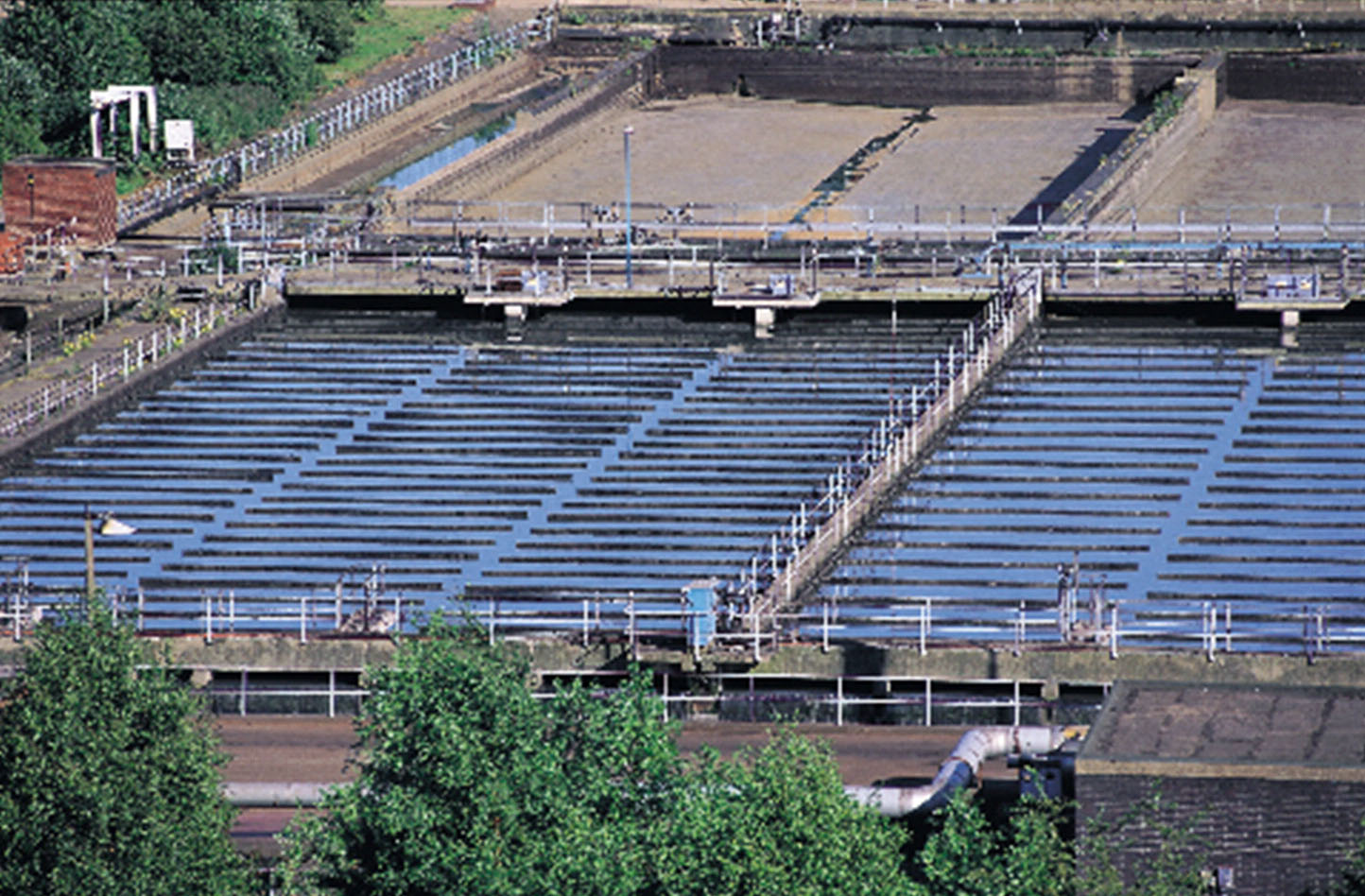
Sand filter used for water treatment

Sand filters are used as a step in the water treatment process of water purification.

There are three main types; rapid (gravity) sand filters, upward flow sand filters and slow sand filters. All three methods are used extensively in the water industry throughout the world. The first two require the use of flocculant chemicals to work effectively while slow sand filters can produce very high quality water with pathogens removal from 90% to >99% (depending on the strains), taste and odour without the need for chemical aids. Sand filters can, apart from being used in water treatment plants, be used for water purification in singular households as they use materials which are available for most people.

== History ==
The history of separation techniques reaches far back, as filter materials were already in use during ancient periods. Rushes and genista plants were used to fill sieving vessels that separated solid and liquid materials. The Egyptians also used porous clay vessels to filter drinking water, wine and other liquids.

== Sand bed filtration concept ==
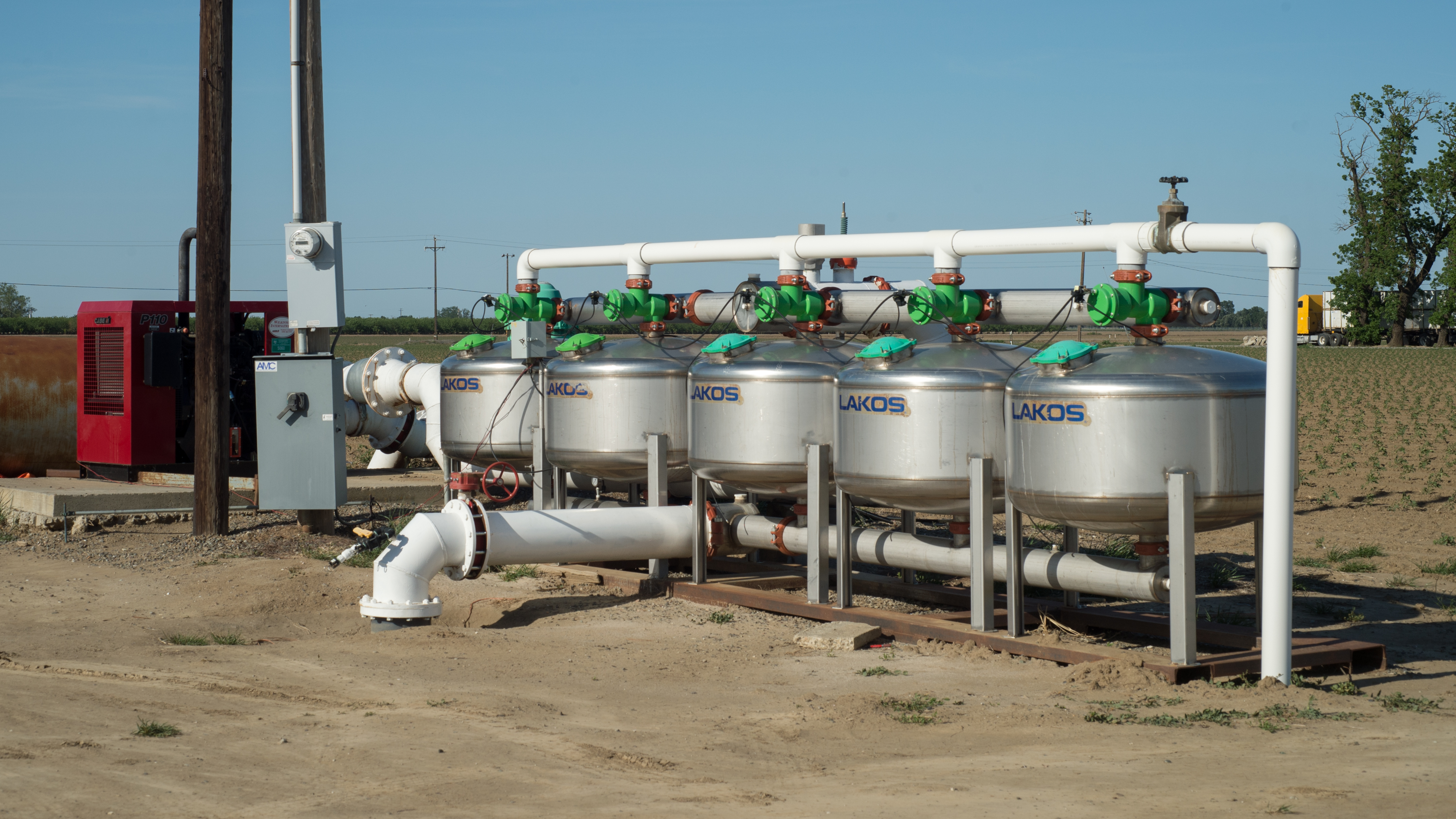
Sand filters on a tomato farm in California

A sand bed filter is a kind of depth filter. Broadly, there are two types of filters for separating particulate solids from fluids:

- Surface filters, where particulates are captured on a permeable surface
- Depth filters, where particulates are captured within a porous body of material.

In addition, there are passive and active devices for causing solid-liquid separation such as settling tanks, self-cleaning screen filters, hydrocyclones and centrifuges.

There are several kinds of depth filters, some employing fibrous material and others employing granular materials. Sand bed filters are an example of a granular loose media depth filter. They are usually used to separate small amounts (<10 parts per million or <10 g per cubic metre) of fine solids (<100 micrometres) from aqueous solutions. In addition, they are usually used to purify the fluid rather than capture the solids as a valuable material. Therefore they find most of their uses in liquid effluent (wastewater) treatment.

=== Particulate solids capture mechanisms ===
Sand bed filters work by providing the particulate solids with many opportunities to be captured on the surface of a sand grain. As fluid flows through the porous sand along a tortuous route, the particulates come close to sand grains. They can be captured by one of several mechanisms:

- Direct collision
- Van der Waals or London force attraction
- Surface charge attraction
- Diffusion

In addition, particulate solids can be prevented from being captured by surface charge repulsion if the surface charge of the sand is of the same sign (positive or negative) as that of the particulate solid. Furthermore, it is possible to dislodge captured particulates although they may be re-captured at a greater depth within the bed. Finally, a sand grain that is already contaminated with particulate solids may become more attractive or repel addition particulate solids. This can occur if by adhering to the sand grain the particulate loses surface charge and becomes attractive to additional particulates or the opposite and surface charge is retained repelling further particulates from the sand grain.

In some applications it is necessary to pre-treat the effluent flowing into a sand bed to ensure that the particulate solids can be captured. This can be achieved by one of several methods:

- Adjusting the surface charge on the particles and the sand by changing the pH
- Coagulation – adding small, highly charged cations (aluminium 3+ or calcium 2+ are usually used)
- Flocculation – adding small amounts of charge polymer chains which either form a bridge between the particulate solids (making them bigger) or between the particulate solids and the sand.

=== Operating regimes ===
They can be operated either with upward flowing fluids or downward flowing fluids the latter being much more usual. For downward flowing devices the fluid can flow under pressure or by gravity alone. Pressure sand bed filters tend to be used in industrial applications and often referred to as rapid sand bed filters. Gravity fed units are used in water purification especially drinking water and these filters have found wide use in developing countries (slow sand filters).

Overall, there are several categories of sand bed filter:

- rapid (gravity) sand filters
- rapid (pressure) sand bed filters
- upflow sand filters
- slow sand filters

The sketch illustrates the general structure of a rapid pressure sand filter. The filter sand takes up most space of the chamber. It sits either on a nozzle floor or on top of a drainage system which allows the filtered water to exit. The pre-treated raw water enters the filter chamber on the top, flows through the filter medium and the effluent drains through the drainage system in the lower part. Large process plants have also a system implemented to evenly distribute the raw water to the filter. In addition, a distribution system controlling the air flow is usually included. It allows a constant air and water distribution and prevents too high water flows in specific areas. A typical grain distribution exits due to the frequent backwashing. Grains with smaller diameter are dominant in the upper part of the sand layer while coarse grain dominates in the lower parts.

Two processes influencing the functionality of a filter are ripening and regeneration.
At the beginning of a new filter run, the filter efficiency increases simultaneously with the number of captured particles in the medium. This process is called filter ripening. During filter ripening the effluent might not meet quality criteria and must be reinjected at previous steps in the plant. Regeneration methods allow the reuse of the filter medium. Accumulated solids from the filter bed are removed. During backwashing, water (and air) is pumped backwards through the filter system. Backwash water may partially be reinjected in front of the filter process and generated sewage needs to be discarded. The backwashing time is determined by either the turbidity value behind the filter, which must not exceed a set threshold, or by the head loss across the filter medium, which must also not exceed a certain value.

==== Rapid pressure sand bed filter design ====
Rapid pressure filter 1=raw water, 2=filtered water, 3=tank, 4=outlet flushing water, 5=inlet flushing water, 6=retraction line, 7=scavenging air, 8=injector, 9=supporting layer, 10=filter sand, 11=flushing funnel, 12=ventilation

Smaller sand grains provide more surface area and therefore a higher decontamination of the inlet water, but it also requires more pumping energy to drive the fluid through the bed. A compromise is that most rapid pressure sand bed filters use grains in the range 0.6 to 1.2 mm although for specialist applications other sizes may be specified. Larger feed particles (>100 micrometres) will tend to block the pores of the bed and turn it into a surface filter that blinds rapidly. Larger sand grains can be used to overcome this problem, but if significant amounts of large solids are in the feed they need to be removed upstream of the sand bed filter by a process such as settling.

The depth of the sand bed is recommended to be around 0.6–1.8 m (2–6 ft) regardless of the application. This is linked to the maximum throughput discussed below.

Guidance on the design of rapid sand bed filters suggests that they should be operated with a maximum flow rate of 9 m^{3}/m^{2}/hr (220 US gal/ft^{2}/hr). Using the required throughput and the maximum flow rate, the required area of the bed can be calculated.

The final key design point is to be sure that the fluid is properly distributed across the bed and that there are no preferred fluid paths where the sand may be washed away and the filter be compromised.

Rapid pressure sand bed filters are typically operated with a feed pressure of 2 to 5 bar(a) (28 to 70 psi(a)). The pressure drop across a clean sand bed is usually very low. It builds as particulate solids are captured on the bed. Particulate solids are not captured uniformly with depth, more are captured higher up with bed with the concentration gradient decaying exponentially.

This filter type will capture particles down to very small sizes, and does not have a true cut off size below which particles will always pass. The shape of the filter particle size-efficiency curve is a U-shape with high rates of particle capture for the smallest and largest particles with a dip in between for mid-sized particles.

The build-up of particulate solids causes an increase in the pressure lost across the bed for a given flow rate. For a gravity fed bed when the pressure available is constant, the flow rate will fall. When the pressure loss or flow is unacceptable and the filter is not working effectively any longer, the bed is remove the accumulated particles. For a pressurized rapid sand bed filter this occurs when the pressure drop is around 0.5 bar. The backwash fluid is pumped backwards through the bed until it is fluidized and has expanded by up to about 30% (the sand grains start to mix and as they rub together they drive off the particulate solids). The smaller particulate solids are washed away with the backwash fluid and captured usually in a settling tank. The fluid flow required to fluidize the bed is typically 3 to 10 m^{3}/m^{2}/hr but not run for long (a few minutes). Small amounts of sand can be lost in the backwashing process and the bed may need to be topped up periodically.

==== Slow sand filter design ====
As the title indicates, the speed of filtration is changed in the slow sand filter, however, the biggest difference between slow and rapid sand filter, is that the top layer of sand is biologically active, as microbial communities are introduced to the system. The recommended and usual depth of the filter is 0.9 to 1.5 meters. Microbial layer is formed within 10–20 days from the start of the operation. During the process of filtration, raw water can percolate through the porous sand medium, stopping and trapping organic material, bacteria, viruses and cysts such as Giardia and Cryptosporidium. The regeneration procedure for slow sand filters is called scraping and is used to mechanically remove the dried out particles on the filter. However, this process can also be done under water, depending on the individual system. Another limiting factor for the water being treated is turbidity, which is for slow sand filters defined to be 10 NTU (Nephelometric Turbidity Units). Slow sand filters are a good option for limited budget operations as the filtration is not using any chemicals and requires little or no mechanical assistance. However, because of a continuous growing population in communities, slow sand filters are being replaced for rapid sand filters, mostly due to the running period length.

==== Characteristics of rapid and slow sand filters ====
Characteristics	Rapid sand filter	Slow sand filter
Filtration rate [m/h]	5–15	0.08–0.25
Media effective size [mm]	0.5–1.2	0.15–0.30
Bed depth [m]	0.6–1.9	0.9–1.5
Run length	1–4 days	1–6 months
Ripening period	15 min – 2 h	Several days
Regeneration method	Backwashing	Scraping
Maximum raw-water turbidity	Unlimited with proper pretreatment	10 NTU

==== Upflow bed filter design ====
The continuously backflushing or upflow sand filter is the newest operating regime. The clearest difference with respect to the previous ones, is that the water to be filtered is fed from the bottom and the filtered water is obtained at the top. This reverse flow allows the backwash process to be integrated in the filtration process, thus decreasing the amount of rinse water to be used and reducing cleaning time. The maximum loading is about 5.4 lps/m2 with a constant head loss of 0.6 m.

==== Mixed bed filters ====
Filters that utilize different types of media arranged in layers are known as mixed bed or multimedia filters. Common filter materials include sand, anthracite, granular activated carbon (GAC), garnet, and ilmenite, each selected for their specific physical properties:

- Anthracite: A hard, low-volatile coal, often used as the top layer due to its light density.
- GAC: Functions both as a filter and an adsorbent, capturing dissolved organic compounds.
- Garnet: A dense, mineral-rich medium with a reddish hue.
- Ilmenite: A heavy oxide of iron and titanium, used for its high density.
- Sand: A traditional and widely used filtration medium.

These materials can be used alone or in combination. In multimedia filters, the media layers are always arranged by density: heavier materials like garnet and ilmenite settle at the bottom, while lighter ones like anthracite are placed on top. This configuration creates varying porosity throughout the filter bed, resulting in more effective filtration and different levels of pressure drop.

A typical multimedia filter setup includes anthracite on top, followed by sand, and then garnet at the bottom, all supported by a gravel base. The depth for such filters ranges from 0.6 to 1 meter each layer. Depths above 1 meter significantly increase pressure drop, while shallower beds compromise layer thickness and reduce efficiency.

When the pressure drop exceeds 10 psi, a backwash operation is necessary. During backwashing, water flow is reversed (upward) to lift the filter media and remove accumulated particles, which are then discharged with the backwash water. Common for the backwash is around 3 times the normal filtering flux (must be high enough to lift the filtering media to remove the particles trapped in it).

Filters classification:

- Monomedia Filters: Consist of a single layer, typically sand; these are largely obsolete.
- Deep-Bed Monomedia: Use a single layer of either anthracite or GAC, ideal for consistent water quality and longer operating cycles.
- Dual Media Filters: Comprise two layers, typically sand at the bottom and anthracite or GAC on top.
- Trimedia Filters: Use three layers, (commonly garnet or ilmenite (bottom), sand (middle), and anthracite (top)), offering a balance of filtration efficiency and capacity.

Mixed bed filters parameters:

Parameters	Typical Range
Each layer of material [m]	0.6-1.0
Flow rate [gpm/ft^2]	3-7
Pressure drop [psi]	3-7
Backwash trigger	Pressure drop exceeds 10 psi

=== Uses in water treatment ===
All of these methods are used extensively in the water industry throughout the world. The first three in the list above require the use of flocculant chemicals to work effectively. Slow sand filters produce high-quality water without the use of chemical aids.

Passing flocculated water through a rapid gravity sand filter strains out the floc and the particles trapped within it, reducing numbers of bacteria and removing most of the solids. The medium of the filter is sand of varying grades. Where taste and odor may be a problem (organoleptic impacts), the sand filter may include a layer of activated carbon to remove such taste and odor.

Sand filters become clogged with floc or bioclogged after a period in use. Slow sand filters are then scraped (see above) while rapid sand filters are backwashed or pressure washed to remove the floc. This backwash water is run into settling tanks so that the floc can settle out and it is then disposed of as waste material. The supernatant water is then run back into the treatment process or disposed of as a waste-water stream. In some countries, the sludge may be used as a soil conditioner. Inadequate filter maintenance has been the cause of occasional drinking water contamination.

Sand filters are occasionally used in the sewage treatment as a final polishing stage. In these filters the sand traps residual suspended material and bacteria and provides a physical matrix for bacterial decomposition of nitrogenous material, including ammonia and nitrates, into nitrogen gas.

Sand filters are one of the most useful treatment processes as the filtering process (especially with slow sand filtration) combines within itself many of the purification functions.

=== Advantages and limitations ===
One of the advantages of sand filters is that they are useful for different applications. Moreover, the different types of operation modes: rapid, slow and Upflow, allow some flexibility to adapt the filtration method to the necessities and requirements of the users. Sand filters allow a high efficiency for color and microorganisms removal, and as they are very simple, operating costs are very low. What is more, its simplicity makes the automation of the processes easier, thus requiring less human intervention.

The main limitations of this technology would be related to the clogging, that is, the obstruction of the filter media, which requires a significant amount of water to carry out the backflush operation and the use of chemicals in the pretreatment. Furthermore, slow sand filters usually require larger land areas compared to the rapid flow, especially if the raw water is highly contaminated. However, despite these limitations, they offer much more capabilities and that is why they are extensively used in the industry.

=== Challenges in the application process ===
In the process of water treatment, one should be aware of certain factors that might cause serious problems if not treated properly. Aforementioned processes such as filter ripening and backwashing influence not only the water quality but also the time needed for the full treatment. Backwashing reduces also the volume of the effluent. If a certain amount of water has to be delivered to e.g. a community, this water loss needs to be considered. In addition, backwashing waste needs to be treated or properly discarded. From the chemical perspective, varying raw water qualities and changes in the temperature effect, already at the entrance to the plant, the efficiency of the treatment process.

Considerable uncertainty is involved regarding models used to construct sand filters. This is due to mathematical assumptions that have to be made such as all grains being spherical. The spherical shape affects the interpretation of the size since the diameter is different for spherical and non-spherical grains. The packing of the grains within the bed is also dependent on the shape of the grains. This then affects the porosity and hydraulic flow.

== Uses in industry ==
Sand filters are used in various sectors and processes, where far-reaching removal of suspended matter from water or wastewater is required.

Sectors where sand filtration is implemented include drinking water production, swimming pools, car washes, groundwater treatment, slaughterhouses, fruit and vegetable processing industry, drinks, food industry, surface treatment of metals...

Cooling water production, pre-filtration in active carbon treatments and membrane systems;

- Iron-removal from groundwater using aeration and sand filtration.
- Final purification of wastewater, follow-up to metal precipitation and sedimentation, to remove residual traces of metal-based sludge.
- Final purification of wastewater produced in the production of iron, steel and non-ferro alloys. Sand filtration can be preceded by processes like precipitation/sedimentation, coagulation/flocculation/sedimentation and flotation.
- Purification of wastewater containing sand-blasting grit and paint particles, at shipyards for example.
- Also used as final purification (or prior to active carbon filtration) to permit re-use.
- Used in greenhouse horticulture as drain-water disinfectant (slow sand filter).
- Stormwater filtration used for filtering pollutants from surface runoff.
- Sewage provides a physical matrix to decompose nitrogen based compounds such ammonia.

== See also ==
- American Water Works Association
- Water treatment
- Water purification
- Jewell water filter
