= National Highway 4 (India, old numbering) =

Old numbered highway in India

NH4 (India, old numbering)
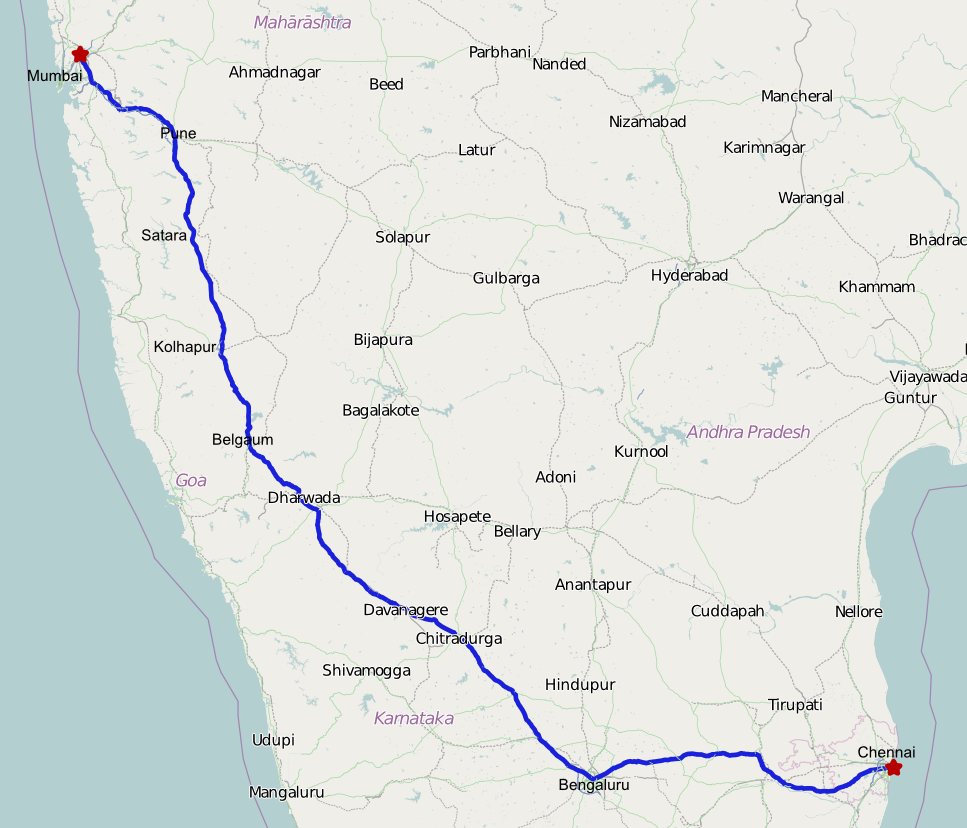
- Road map of India with National Highway 4 (pre 2010) highlighted in solid blue colour

Route information
- Part of AH45 AH47
- Length: 1,235 km (767 mi)
- Time period: Pre 2010

Major junctions
- From: Mumbai, Maharashtra
- List: NH 8 in Mumbai; NH 3 in Thane; NH 17 in Panvel; NH 9 in Pune; NH 50 in Pune; NH 63 in Hubli; NH 13 in Chitradurga; NH 234 in Sira; NH 207 in Dobbaspet, and Hosakote; NH 48 in Nelamangala, Bangalore rural district; NH 7 in Bangalore(ORR, Silkboard-Hebbal); NH 209 in Bangalore; NH 18 in Chittoor; NH 5 in Chennai; NH 45 in Chennai; NH 205 in Chennai
- To: Chennai, Tamil Nadu

Location
- Country: India
- States: Maharashtra: 371 km (231 mi); Karnataka: 658 km (409 mi); Andhra Pradesh: 83 km (52 mi); Tamil Nadu: 133 km (83 mi)
- Primary destinations: Mumbai - Thane - Panvel - Pune - Satara - Karad - Uran Islampur - Kolhapur - Belagavi - Dharwad - Hubli - Haveri - Ranebennur - Davangere - Chitradurga - Sira - Tumkur - Bangalore - Kolar - Chittoor - Thiruvalam - Ranipet - Walajapet - Sriperumbudur - Chennai

Highway system
- Roads in India; Expressways; National; State; Asian
| ← NH 3 | → NH 4A |

National Highway 4 (NH 4) was a major National Highway before National Highway renumbering in Western and Southern India. NH 4 linked four of the 10 most populous Indian cities – Mumbai, Pune, Bangalore, and Chennai. NH 4 was 1,235 km (767 mi) in length and passed through the states of Maharashtra, Karnataka, and Tamil Nadu. It is now numbered as National Highway 48 (India). National Highway 4 was known as P.B. Road (Pune-Bangalore Road) in many parts of Maharashtra and Karnataka states, before it was renumbered.

== Route ==
NH 4 constituted roughly 90% of the Golden Quadrilateral's Mumbai–Chennai segment. As a part of this project NH 4 has been widened from two-lane single carriageway to four-lane dual carriageway. The highway is known as Pune–Bangalore (PB) Road in some parts of Karnataka where it passes through. The Mumbai–Pune section of the highway was supplemented by the Mumbai–Pune Expressway in 2000. The NH 4 highway passes through highly populated towns and cities of Maharashtra, Karnataka, Tamil Nadu and Andhra Pradesh namely Pune, Satara, Karad, Sangli, Kolhapur, Belgaum, Dharwad, Hubli, Haveri, Ranibennur, Davanagere, Chitradurga, Tumkur, Bangalore, Kolar, Kanchipuram, and Sriperumbudur. The Bangalore-Chennai section of the highway is supplemented by the triangle of National Highways NH 7, NH 46, and returns to NH 4 at Walajapet in Ranipet. In some areas, one side of the highway is made of concrete while the other side is of tar. To overcome heavy traffic between Bangalore and Chennai the NHAI had planned to build the Bangalore–Chennai Expressway which allows vehicles to ply at a max speed 120kmph.It will start from Sriperumbudur in Tamil Nadu and terminate at Hosakote near Bangalore in Karnataka which is nearly 240 km.

The NH 4 by-passed Pune from Dehu Road to Katraj. The Pune bypass has 4 lanes. There is a partial service lane which cannot be called as motorable. Now, it is being widened by two more lanes, making it a 6-lane road from Dehu Road to Katraj since it is also used by the people of Pune as the city is growing on the other side of the highway too. NH 4 now also bypasses the busy Katraj ghat in Pune by a tunnel which saves almost one hour of travel on NH 4.

NH 4 bypasses Sangli at about 40 km (25 mi). There are two exits for Sangli–Miraj twin cities on NH 4. Both exits form a triangle with NH 4 and Sangli is about 40 km (25 mi) from each exit. Peth Naka exit is used by vehicles coming from Mumbai and Pune towards Sangli. Shiroli Naka exit is used by vehicles coming from Bangalore, Hubli, Belgaum and Kolhapur to reach Sangli. The proposed 4 lane Ratnagiri-Nagpur National Highway NH 204 meets National Highway NH 4 at Shiroli Naka about 35 km from Sangli.

== Major towns and cities ==
Maharashtra:

- Mumbai
- Panvel
- Pune
- Satara
- Karad
- Sangli–Miraj - Two exits at 40 km (25 mi) each
- Ichalkaranji - 25 km from Kolhapur
- Kolhapur

Karnataka:

- Nipani
- Sankeshwar
- Belgaum
- Hubli–Dharwad
- Haveri
- Ranebennur
- Harihar
- Davanagere
- Chitradurga
- Hiriyur
- Sira
- Tumkur
- Bangalore
- Kolar
- Mulbagal

Andhra Pradesh

- Palamaner
- Bangarupalem
- Chittoor

Tamil Nadu:

- Ranipet
- Walajapet
- Kanchipuram
- Sriperumbudur
- Chennai

== See also ==
- National Highways Development Project
- Mumbai–Pune Expressway
- National Highways Authority of India
