= Mogili =

Village in Andhra Pradesh, India

Mogili is a small village located in the Bangarupalem mandal (Revenue division) of Chittoor District, Andhra Pradesh in southern India.

It is near the ghat section, on the Palamaneru – Bangarupalem – Chittoor segment of the National Highway No. 4, which connects Mumbai on the west coast of India with Chennai city on the east coast. It is an accident prone stretch in the ghat section.

One has to travel 10 km from Palamaneru towards Chittoor to reach the village. Chittoor, the district headquarters, is at a distance of 25 km from the village.
