= Baireddipalle =

Baireddipalle is a village and headquarters of Baireddipalle mandal in Chittoor district, Andhra Pradesh, India.
