= Melmonavoor =

- Neighbourhood
- Location in Tamil Nadu, India
- Coordinates: 12°55′15″N 79°05′34″E
- Country: India
- State: Tamil Nadu
- District: Vellore District
- Talukas: Vellore

Government
  - Body: Vellore city

Languages tamil
  - Official: Tamil
- Time zone: UTC+5:30 (IST)
- PIN: 632010
- Telephone code: 91 416
- Vehicle registration: TN 23
- Lok Sabha constituency: Vellore
- Vidhan Sabha constituency: Vellore

Melmonavoor or Melmanavur or Melmonavur is a village panchayat in Vellore district, located to pincode 632010. It is located 4.5 kilometres from the city of Vellore. About Melmanavur According to Census 2011 information the location code or village code of Melmanavur village is 630799. Melmanavur village is located in Vellore Tehsil of Vellore district in Tamil Nadu, India. Vellore is the district & sub-district headquarter of Melmanavur village. As per 2009 stats, Melmonavoor is the gram panchayat of Melmanavur village.

The total geographical area of village is 458.74 hectares. Melmanavur has a total population of 4,601 peoples. There are about 1,182 houses in Melmanavur village. As per 2019 stats, Melmanavur villages comes under Anaikattu assembly & Vellore parliamentary constituency.

== Education ==
=== Schools ===
- Melmonavoor Government primary School
- Melmonavoor Government primary School 2
- Melmonavoor Government High School

=== Colleges ===
- Industrial Training Institute (ITI)
- Pallavan College of Education
