= Bangarupalem mandal =

Bangarupalyam mandal
- Mandal
- Interactive map of Bangarupalyam mandal
- Location in Andhra Pradesh, India
- Coordinates: 13.1962°N 78.9133°E
- Country: India
- State: Andhra Pradesh
- District: Chittoor
- Headquarters: Bangarupalyam

Population (2011)
  - Total: 73,199

Languages
  - Official: Telugu
- Time zone: UTC+5:30 (IST)
- Vehicle registration: AP 39

Bangarupalyam mandal is one of the 66 mandals in the Chittoor district of the Indian state of Andhra Pradesh. Its headquarters are located at Bangarupalyam. The mandal borders Tamil Nadu and is bounded by Palamaner, Gangavaram, Thavanampalle and Yadamari mandals of Chittoor district.

== Towns and villages ==
As of 2011 census, the mandal has 29 villages.

The settlements in the mandal are listed below:

1. Beripalle
2. Bodabandla
3. Gunthur
4. Gollapalli
5. Gundla Kattamanchi
6. Jambuvaripalle
7. Kallurupalle
8. Kalvamiogilappakandriga
9. Keeramanda
10. Kurmaipalle
11. Mahasamudram
12. Mogili
13. Mogilivari Palli
14. Mothagunta
15. Nalagampalli
16. Nallangadu
17. Noonegundlapalle
18. Palamakulapalle
19. Paleru
20. Perumalla Palli
21. Sadakuppam
22. Setteri
23. Tekumanda
24. Thambuganipalle
25. Thoompayanapalle
26. Thumba Kuppam
27. Tumba
28. Venkatagiri
29. Vepanapalle
30. Madhava Nagar

== See also ==
- List of mandals in Andhra Pradesh
