= Bethamangala =

- village
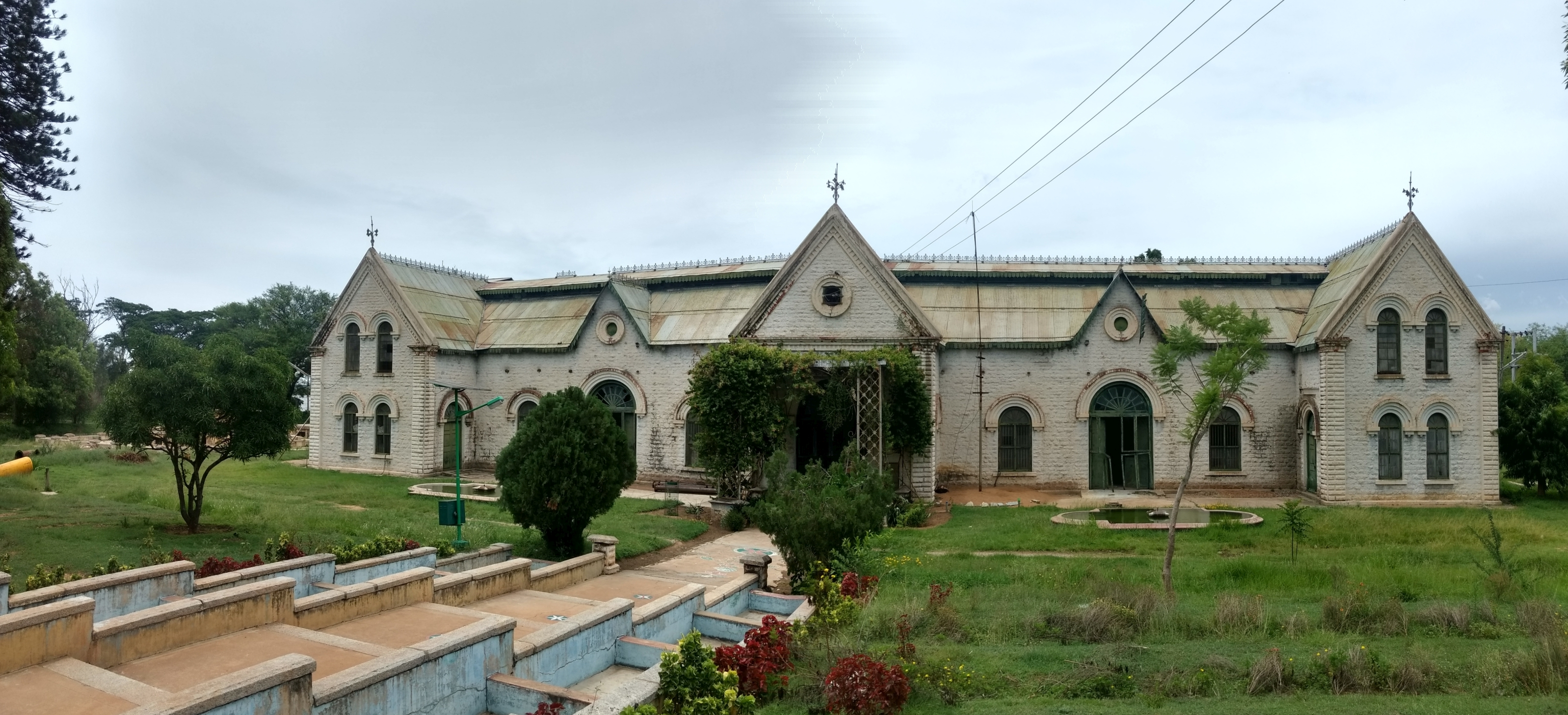
- Bethamangala water works site

- Location in Karnataka, India
- Coordinates: 13.0066°N 78.3287°E
- Country: India
- State: Karnataka
- District: Kolar District

Government
  - Body: Gram panchayat

Languages
  - Official: Kannada
- Time zone: UTC+5:30 (IST)
- ISO 3166 code: IN-KA
- Vehicle registration: KA
- Website: karnataka.gov.in

Bethamangala is a small town in the Kolar Gold Field taluk of Kolar district in the state of Karnataka, India. The town is centred around a large man-made lake created by damming the Palar river. The lake supplies drinking water to the nearby mining city of Kolar Gold Fields ("KGF"). The Bethamangala water works was established in 1903-04 and is a popular tourist site.

== History ==
The river Palar flows from the Nandi Hills and a dam on it creates the Bethamangala lake and further downstream another dam creates the Ramasagara. Inscriptions indicate that the embankment of Bethamangala breached in 950 AD and again in 1155 AD.

Bethamangala is home to the several temples including the Vijayendra temple, which dates back to the period of the Gangas and has been renovated by the Hoysalas and the Vijayanagar rulers. Lord Venkateshwara Temple in Bangaru Tirupati (Guttahalli), Kotilingeshwara Temple. The Sri Kodandaramaswamy Temple in Chennapalli near Kotiligeshwara has been newly renovated by Kammasandra Suresh who is a Social Worker and the native of Chennapalli. Villagers also joined hands for the renovation of this temple which is popularly known as Sri Ram Mandir of this region. Recently renovated Lord Venkateshwara Temple in Mahadevapura Village is located close to the town.

== Notable people ==
- K. Chengalaraya Reddy- First Chief Minister of Karnataka & Freedom Fighter
- A. Chinnappa- Member of Legislative Assembly
