= Atal Setu, Goa =

Bridge in India

Atal Setu
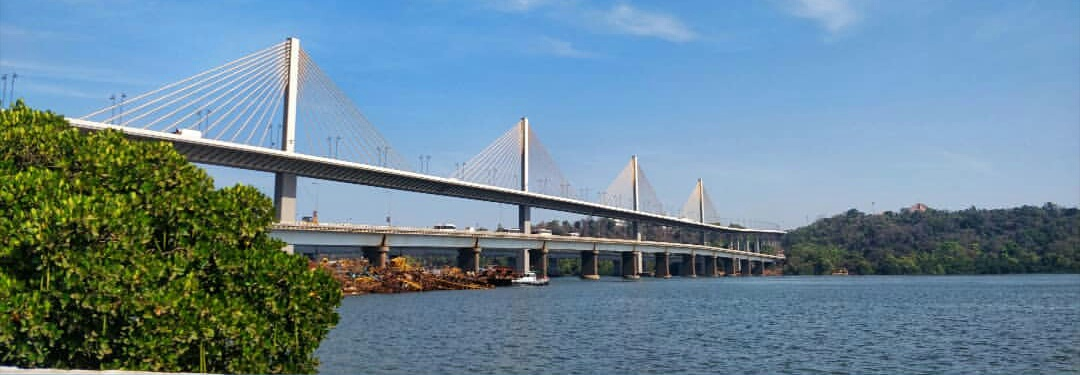
- Coordinates: 15°30′10″N 73°50′14″E
- Carries: 4 lanes of NH 66
- Crosses: Mandovi River
- Locale: Panaji, Goa, India
- Official name: Atal Setu
- Other name: Third Mandovi Bridge
- Named for: PM Atal Bihari Vajpayee
- Maintained by: Goa State Infrastructure Development Corporation Limited (GSIDC)

Characteristics
- Design: Cable-stayed bridge
- Material: Steel and concrete pylons
- Total length: 3,190 metres (10,470 ft)
- Width: 21 metres (69 ft)
- Height: 30 metres (98 ft)
- Longest span: 150 metres (490 ft)
- Piers in water: 4

History
- Constructed by: Larsen & Toubro (L&T), DSI-Bridgecon
- Construction start: 27 July 2014
- Construction end: December 2018
- Opened: 5 February 2019
- Inaugurated: 27 January 2019

Location
- Interactive map of Atal Setu

The Atal Setu is a cable-stayed bridge in Goa that runs between Panaji and Porvorim. It carries National Highway 66 over the tidal part of the Mandovi River. It is 3.2 kilometres (2.0 mi) long, making it the 4th longest cable-stayed bridge in India. Two wheelers, three wheelers and bullock carts are prohibited from using the Atal Setu due to its height of 30 metres (98 ft). It officially opened on 5 February 2019.

Illuminated bridge at night

== History ==
The Atal Setu is one of the most famous and longest bridges in Goa. It is the third bridge to be built over the Mandovi River. Before the First Mandovi Bridge was built, the ferry was the main mode of transport across the Mandovi River in the 1970s, between Panaji and Betim village. Due to heavy traffic, the first bridge was built in the 1970s. In 1986 the first bridge collapsed and was rebuilt. The second bridge was constructed in 1998 to accommodate heavy transport vehicles. Construction began on the third bridge in 2014. The reason for the third cable-stayed bridge is to accommodate heavy traffic, especially during the peak year-end tourist season. The bridge was inaugurated on 27 January 2019.

== Construction ==
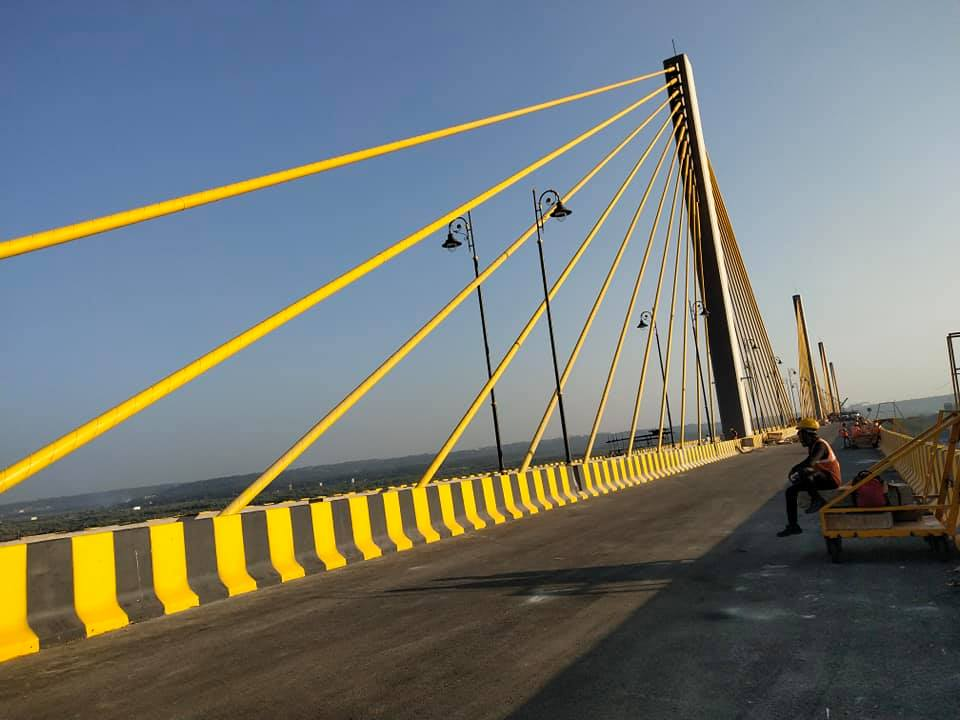
The bridges pylon's measure up to 70 meters in height.

On 14 June 2014, Indian Prime Minister Narendra Modi laid the foundation stone for the third Mandovi bridge. The bridge was completed on 27 January 2019 and inaugurated by the Central Minister for Road Transport and Highways Nitin Gadkari; and later by Goa Chief Minister Manohar Parrikar in the presence of former deputy Chief Minister of Goa Sudin Dhavalikar, who was the State Minister for Roads at the time. This bridge was named Atal Setu after former Prime Minister Atal Bihari Vajpayee. On 5 February, the bridge was opened for vehicular traffic.

Larsen and Toubro (L&T) were awarded the EPC contract at a bid of ₹403 crore (US$48 million) to build and design the bridge. It is a cable-stayed bridge constructed between the first and second parallel bridges and is 15 meters higher than the existing two bridges. This is Goa's longest bridge and India's third longest cable-stayed bridge. The bridge is a 900 m four lane bridge with a 550 m cable stay portion and a 3.2 km viaduct approach. The main bridge is 600 m in length with two end spans of 75 m and three interior spans of 150 m. The main bridge superstructure consists of a 21 m wide externally strutted segmented concrete box girder with a dual carriageway of 2 x 8.5 m with a 3 m wide median at the centre. The box girder is supported by stay cables anchored in the pylon and stressed from a box girder bottom. Another flyover arising from the Merces-Old Goa bypass road joins the Mandovi bridge for traffic from Ponda towards Panjim.

The revised cost of construction of the bridge was ₹5.5 billion (US$65 million) and the cost could increase by ₹500 million (US$5.9 million). The Goa State Infrastructure Development Corporation (GSIDC) said that almost 100 million litres of water was saved while building the bridge.

=== Finance ===
During the laying of the foundation stone, the Government of Goa claimed that the bridge would be funded independently. The loan agreement was signed on 8 June 2015 between the National Bank for Agriculture and Rural Development (NABARD) and the nodal agency, who granted a loan amount of ₹4.626 billion (US$55 million). The original cost was estimated to be ₹4.7 billion (US$56 million), that has risen to ₹8.6 billion (US$100 million). With a re-payment period of 12 years, the government is supposed to pay an interest of ₹480 million (US$5.7 million) annually for the loan. The total amount to be repaid to NABARD by the end of June 2027, therefore, stands at ₹8.6644 billion (US$100 million). The bridge is the most expensive in Goan history. On 20 March 2018, the Union Minister for Road Transport & Highways, Nitin Gadkari, said that the central government would bear 50 percent of the bridge's cost, which is ₹4 billion (US$47 million) and an additional ₹500 million (US$5.9 million) for the road connecting the bridge.

== Incidents ==
On 26 December 2016, a worker died on the construction site after suffering from 90 percent burns after a fire broke out in an 8 meter deep vertical tunnel of the under construction bridge pillar. On 30 December 2017, a fire broke out on an under construction pier supporting the cable-stayed bridge; however, there were no casualties and the situation was brought under control.

== Traffic ==
Mandovi Bridge is one of the most heavily used bridges in Goa. According to GSIDC sources, almost 66,000 vehicles travel over the bridge every day.

Due to high wind speeds, GSIDC announced that two-wheelers and three-wheelers are prohibited from using Atal Setu.

== Criticism ==
=== Environmental issues ===
The construction of the third bridge was challenged by the Goa Foundation, who alleged that it is being constructed without an Environment Clearance. It also challenged the destruction of some 247 mangrove trees for constructing ramps to access the bridge. According to the Goa State Infrastructure Development Corporation's Environment Impact Assessment (EIA) report as requested by National Green Tribunal, the construction of the bridge would destroy mangroves and impact marine ecology.

The EIA stated that there would be no loss to flora and fauna. However, the mangroves will be replaced at suitable sites identified by the Forest Department, and marine ecology will be restored as stated by the EIA.

== See also ==
- Zuari Bridge
