= Dilip Buildcon =

Construction company based in Bhopal, India

Dilip Buildcon Limited
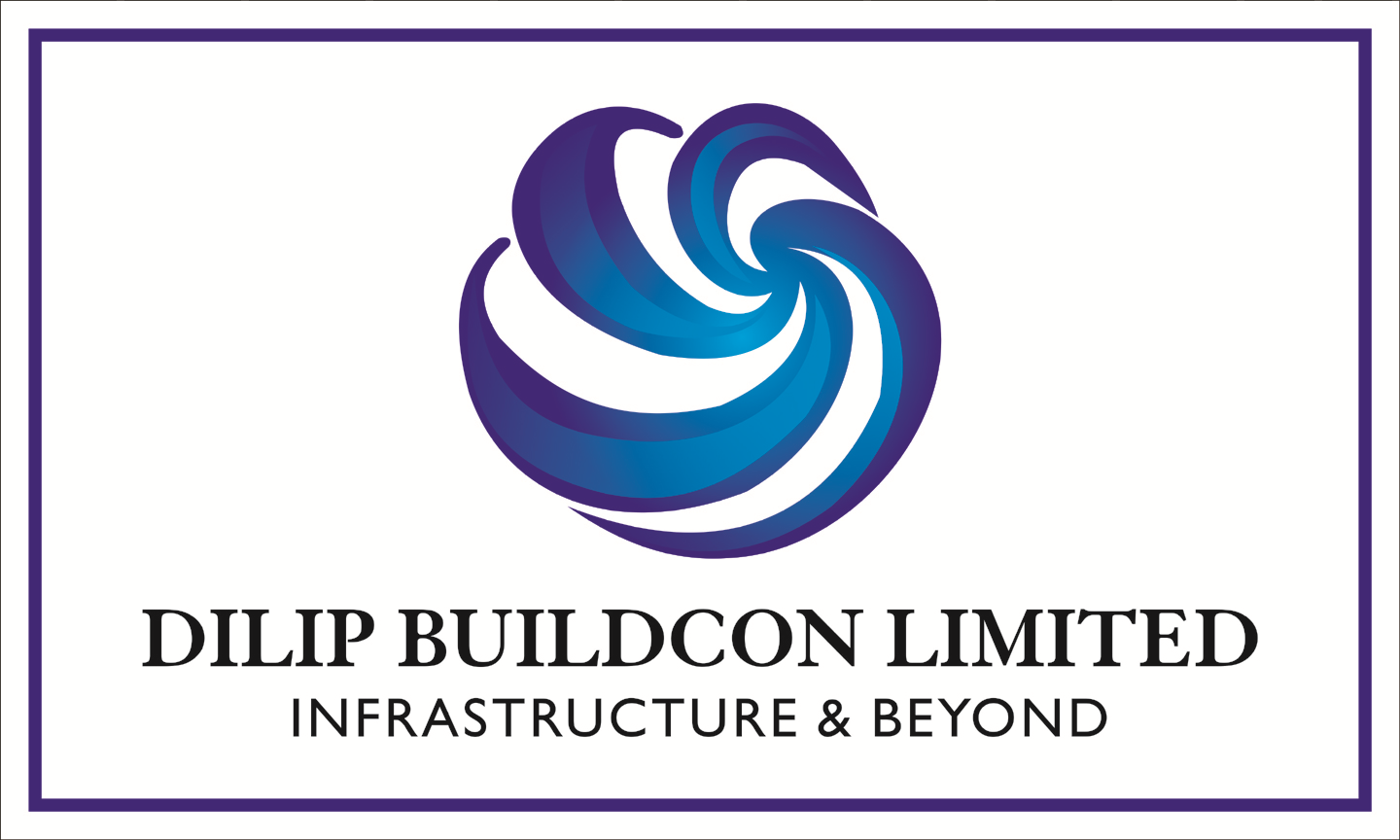
- Type: Public
- Traded as: NSE: DBL; BSE: 540047
- ISIN: INE917M01012
- Industry: Infrastructure, EPC (Engineering, Procurement and Construction)
- Founded: 1987; 39 years ago
- Founder: Dilip Suryavanshi
- Headquarters: Janki Nagar, Bhopal, Madhya Pradesh, India
- Key people: Dilip Suryavanshi (Chairman & MD); Devendra Jain (MD & CEO); Sanjay Kumar Bansal (CFO); Abhishek Shrivastava (Company Secretary)
- Services: Mining and Construction
- Revenue: ▲₹10,119 crore (US$1.1 billion) (FY23)
- Operating income: ▲₹988 crore (US$100 million) (FY23)
- Net income: ▲₹221 crore (US$23 million) (FY23)
- Number of employees: 26,743 (March 2023)
- Website: www.dilipbuildcon.com

Dilip Buildcon Limited (DBL) is an Indian construction and infrastructure development company based in Bhopal. It was founded by Dilip Suryavanshi in 1987 and was incorporated in the Ministry of Corporate Affairs on 12 June 2006. The company is listed on both the Bombay Stock Exchange (BSE) and the National Stock Exchange (NSE) since August 2016.

== History ==
Dilip Buildcon Limited (DBL) was founded in 1987 in Bhopal by Dilip Suryavanshi as a proprietorship concern called Dilip Builders. The company was incorporated as Dilip Buildcon Private Limited on 12 June 2006 as a private limited company under the Companies Act 1956 with the Registrar of Companies Gwalior. Subsequently, the company took over the business of Dilip Builders, a sole proprietorship concern, in 2007. The company registered as a public limited company in August 2010. In the initial years of its operation, the company focused on commercial and residential building projects in Madhya Pradesh.

As business grew in the early 1990s, the company forayed into other types of construction. The first move was into water sanitation and sewage.

The company also did structural designing and construction in the field of the oil and gas industry. At the end of the 1990s, when the new central government put forward a vision of connecting the country with roads, DBL ventured into road construction starting with a small road project.

From 2012, the company started pursuing bigger road projects across the country. In the meantime, the government came up with the PPP model for roads inviting attention from other industries into the sector. DBL invested in procuring the road building equipment from around the world.

In August 2016, Dilip Buildcon became a publicly-listed company through an initial public offering (IPO), and got listed on Bombay Stock Exchange (BSE) and National Stock Exchange (NSE).

== Operations ==
Dilip Buildcon undertakes projects on an Engineering, Procurement and Construction (EPC) basis. This includes special bridges and tunnel. DBL is a Class A-V Firm, registered with Public Works Department Bhopal and also with the Water Resource Department Madhya Pradesh.

=== Highways ===
Dilip Buildcon undertakes projects on National Highways, especially the Expressway. In 2021, Dilip Buildcon's joint venture (JV) entered a pact with the National Highways Authority of India (NHAI) for a Rs 1,000-crore highway project in Rajasthan, to be built on the EPC mode.

=== Metro Rail ===
Dilip Buildcon Limited (DBL) on 25 September 2020 launched the first 8.5-meter wide pre-cast segment at the proposed Kendriya Vidyalay metro station for building the elevated viaduct of the Bhopal Metro Rail project.

=== Mining ===
DBL received an MDO contract signed in 2018 with Punjab State Power Corporation Ltd (PSPCL) for the development and operation of the Pachhwara Central coal mine. DBL bagged another Mine Developer and Operator (MDO) for development and operation of the Siarmal Open Cast Project of Mahanadi Coalfield Ltd. a subsidiary of Coal India Limited for 25 years.

=== Irrigation ===
For the construction of 2 irrigation projects i.e. Kundaliya Dam at a cost of Rs 3,400 crore and Mohanpura Dam at Rs 3,866 crores, the Madhya Pradesh state government tendered Dilip Buildcon Ltd. Mohanpura Dam at Rajgarh, a project undertaken by Dilip Buildcon, was inaugurated by the Prime Minister of India.

== Key projects ==
- Bangalore–Chennai Expressway (three sections totaling 74 km only)
- Bhoj Metro
- Bundelkhand Expressway (45 km only)
- Delhi–Mumbai Expressway (08 km only)
- Taxiway at Dabolim Airport
- Gorakhpur Link Expressway (43 km only)
- Indore Metro
- Mumbai–Nagpur Expressway (45 km only)
- Rajkot Airport
- New Zuari Bridge, Goa
- Bengaluru–Mysuru Expressway (117 km)

== Awards ==
- 2018 Silver Awards for Excellence in Construction Management felicitated by Nitin Gadkari.

== See also ==
- Dineshchandra R. Agrawal Infracon
- Reliance Infrastructure
- Sadbhav Engineering
- IRB Infrastructure
