= Ramasagara =

- village
- Location in Karnataka, India Ramasagara (India)
- Coordinates: 15.28°N 76.37°E
- Country: India
- State: Karnataka
- District: Bellary district
- Talukas: Kampli

Government
  - Body: Gram panchayat

Population (2001)
  - Total: 6,172

Languages
  - Official: Kannada
- Time zone: UTC+5:30 (IST)
- ISO 3166 code: IN-KA
- Vehicle registration: KA
- Website: karnataka.gov.in

Ramasagara is a village in the southern state of Karnataka, India. It is located in the Hospet taluk of Bellary district in Karnataka.

== Demographics ==
As of 2001 India census, Ramasagara had a population of 6172 with 3151 males and 3021 females.

== See also ==
- Bellary
- Districts of Karnataka

This village is situated near Hampi about 12 km & also near to Kampli about 6 km.
