= Gangavaram, Chittoor district =

Gangavaram
- Village
- Interactive map of Gangavaram
- Location in Andhra Pradesh, India Gangavaram (India)
- Coordinates: 13.2177°N 78.7308°E
- Country: India
- State: Andhra Pradesh
- District: Chittoor
- Mandal: Gangavaram

Languages
  - Official: Telugu
- Time zone: UTC+5:30 (IST)
- Vehicle registration: AP

Gangavaram is a village in Chittoor district of the Indian state of Andhra Pradesh. It is the mandal headquarters of Gangavaram mandal.
