= Bangarupalem =

- Village
- Interactive map of Bangarupalem
- Location in Andhra Pradesh, India
- Country: India
- State: Andhra Pradesh
- District: Chittoor
- Mandal: Bangarupalem

Languages
  - Official: Telugu
- Time zone: UTC+5:30 (IST)

Bangarupalem (also spelled sometimes as Bangarupalyam) is a village in Bangarupalem mandal, Chittoor district, Andhra Pradesh, India. The village panchyat by the same name is part of Gollapalli revenue village.
