= Walajapet =

Walajapet Walajapettai
- Municipality
- Location within Tamil Nadu
- Coordinates: 13.00°N 79.314°E
- Country: India
- State: Tamil Nadu
- District: Ranipet district
- Talukas: Walajapet

Government
  - Body: Walajapet Municipality
  - Chairman: Tmt. Harini Thillai

Area
  - Total: 12.41 km^{2} (4.79 sq mi)
- Elevation: 160 m (520 ft)

Population (2011)
  - Total: 47,498
  - Density: 3,827/km^{2} (9,913/sq mi)

Languages
  - Official: Tamil
- Time zone: UTC+5:30 (IST)
- PIN: 632513
- Telephone code: 91 4172
- Vehicle registration: TN 23, TN 73
- Lok Sabha constituency: Arakkonam
- Vidhan Sabha constituency: Walajapet
- Civic agency: Walajapet Municipality

Walajapet is a municipality and taluk in the state of Tamil Nadu.

== Demographics ==
Religious census
Religion	Percent(%)
Hindu	52.13%
Muslim	46.34%
Christian	1.21%
Sikh	0.03%
Buddhist	0.02%
Jain	0.11%
Other	0.14%
No religion	0.02%

According to 2011 census, Walajapet had a population of 32,397 with a sex-ratio of 1,031 females for every 1,000 males, much above the national average of 929. A total of 3,249 were under the age of six, constituting 1,675 males and 1,574 females. Scheduled Castes and Scheduled Tribes accounted for 12.19% and .16% of the population respectively. The average literacy of the town was 77.25%, compared to the national average of 72.99%. The town had a total of 7,598 households. There were a total of 12,223 workers, comprising 50 cultivators, 66 main agricultural labourers, 1,270 in household industries, 10,204 other workers, 633 marginal workers, 8 marginal cultivators, 18 marginal agricultural labourers, 182 marginal workers in household industries and 425 other marginal workers. As per the religious census of 2011, Walajapet had 52.13% Hindus, 46.34% Muslims, 1.21% Christians, 0.03% Sikhs, 0.02% Buddhists, 0.11% Jains, 0.14% following other religions and 0.02% following no religion or did not indicate any religious preference.

== Religion ==
There is a Hindu temple viz., Kasi Viswanathar Temple dedicated to Lord Shiva, in Walajapet.
