= McElhanney =

McElhanney Ltd.
- Type: Private
- Founded: W.G. McElhanney (1910)
- Headquarters: Vancouver, British Columbia, Canada
- Website: https://www.mcelhanney.com/

McElhanney Ltd. is a Canadian employee-owned professional consulting firm headquartered in Vancouver, British Columbia. Established in 1910 by William Gordon McElhanney, the company provides geomatics, engineering, geospatial, environmental, planning, and landscape architecture services. McElhanney operates from more than 30 locations across Western Canada and serves clients in the Cities & Communities, Energy & Resources, and Transportation & Transit sectors.

== History ==
The company was founded in 1910 by William Gordon McElhanney who surveyed the wilds outside burgeoning Vancouver. Between the 1920s to 1950s, the company saw success through significant survey projects such as the Lions Gate Bridge Alignment, Trans Mountain Pipeline, Kemano Tunnel Surveys & Hydro Power Tunnel, and the Stewart-Cassiar Highway projects, while navigating through hardship during the Great Depression (1929 to 1939). W.G. McElhanney retired in 1956, following completion of the firm's first international project, the survey of the Mekong River in Asia.

Following W.G. McElhanney's retirement, the company expanded its services and geographic presence in Western Canada. In 1967, the firm opened its first branch offices in Surrey and Terrace, British Columbia. Over subsequent decades, McElhanney broadened its practice beyond surveying to include engineering, planning, environmental, geospatial, and landscape architecture services for a wide variety of clients mainly in Alberta and British Columbia.

In 1987, the business was reorganized into three sister companies: McElhanney Consulting Services Ltd. (MCSL), McElhanney Legal Survey Limited (MLSL), and GeoSurveys. MCSL operated primarily as an engineering and geomatics consulting firm, while MLSL focused primarily on geomatics services for Alberta's oil and gas industry. GeoSurveys ceased operations in 1994.

In 2018, MLSL changed its name to McElhanney Geomatics Engineering Ltd. (MGEL). In 2019, MGEL and MCSL were amalgamated to form McElhanney Ltd., reuniting the firm's principal operating entities under a single corporate structure.

In 2024, Jennifer Price became President and CEO.

== Acquisition ==
McElhanney Ltd. was established in 2019, by an amalgamation between sister companies, McElhanney Geomatics Engineering Ltd. and McElhanney Consulting Services Ltd., which were separate companies since 1987.

== Recent Projects ==
Recent projects associated with McElhanney include the Trans-Canada Highway Avalanche Mitigation Project in Glacier National Park; the Highway 1 Tank Hill Project – BC Highway Reinstatement Program near Lytton, British Columbia; the Iona Island Wastewater Treatment Plant in Richmond, British Columbia; the Guichon Creek Daylighting Project at the British Columbia Institute of Technology; the Caribou Conservation Breeding Centre in Jasper National Park; and the Lake Louise Traffic Safety & Wildlife Connectivity Program in Banff National Park.

McElhanney has also reported involvement in major infrastructure projects included in ReNew Canada's Top 100 Projects program, including the Site C Clean Energy Project, Surrey–Langley SkyTrain, Valley Line West LRT, and the Yellowhead Trail Freeway Conversion Project.

== Awards ==
McElhanney has received more than 100 project and professional awards since 2000. The company maintains ISO 9001 certification and COR safety certification.

McElhanney has participated in Canada's Best Managed Companies program since 2017. In 2026, the company stated that it had reached a decade of recognition through the program.

McElhanney projects have received recognition from industry organizations including the Canadian Consulting Engineering Awards, the Association of Consulting Engineering Companies of British Columbia, and the Consulting Engineers of Alberta.
