= Faridabad–Noida–Ghaziabad Expressway =

Road in India

- FNG Expressway

Route information
- Length: 56 km (35 mi)
- Status: Under-construction
- Existed: 2022 (expected)–present

Major junctions
- North end: Ghaziabad
- South end: Faridabad

Location
- Country: India
- States: Uttar Pradesh and Haryana
- Major cities: Ghaziabad, Noida, Greater Noida and Faridabad

Highway system
- Roads in India; Expressways; National; State; Asian

Faridabad–Noida–Ghaziabad Expressway (FNG Expressway), an under-construction greenfield 56 km long, 6-lane wide (expandable to 8) expressway in Delhi NCR region of India, will connect Faridabad (Faridabad Bypass Expressway part of Delhi–Mumbai Expressway in Haryana) with Noida (Noida–Greater Noida Expressway) and Ghaziabad in Uttar Pradesh. Ghaziabad-Tronica Expressway (GTE), FNG's planned extension from Ghaziabad to Tronica City (Loni and Mandaula), will connect to the UER-II Alipur-Tronica Extension-Mandaula near Tronica City to form the third ring road around Delhi.

== Route ==
=== Phase-1 Original ===
==== Main route ====
This section around 56 km long, including 20 km in Noida–Greater Noida and 8 km in Ghaziabad and remaining 28.1km is in the Faridabad, was designed by IIT-Roorkee and offers commuters direct connectivity between Noida and Greater Faridabad

Detailed route is as follows:

- Faridabad district
  - NH-148NA (Faridabad Bypass Expressway part of Delhi–Mumbai Expressway): Agra Canal Overbridge connecting Badkhal Road (part of Sohna-Gurugaon Elevated Corridor) in the west with Mata Amritanandamayi Road in the east (near Ma Amrita Hospital).
  - Along Delhi-Mumbai Western DFC corridor via following:
    - Lal Pur village.
    - Chak Mangrola bridge (600-meter long ) over Yamuna river,
- Noida
  - Chhaproli Khadar
  - between Sector 167 and 168 (north of Dostpur Mangrauli) interchange with Noida-Greater Noida Expressway.
  - Pass sequentially east of the following sectors in Noida: Sector 140, 115 (Soharkha village), 122, 121,
  - Sector 65 (Chhijarsi and Rahul Vihar) interchange with NE3 Delhi–Meerut Expressway.
- Ghaziabad district
  - Along Hindon River (west of Siddharth Vihar and Rahul Vihar)
  - Hindan Vihar interchange with NH-334C.

==== Spurs ====
Proposed but not yet approved as of July 2025:

- Delhi-Noida-Dadri Expressway (DND Expressway) spur (listed from west to east):
  - Faridabad
    - Begin Faridabad Sector 37 (DND–KMP Expressway interchange for connectivity to Delhi's Mehrauli-Badarpur Elevated Road and Faridabad's 90 Feet Road)
    - Ajay Nagar-Chak Basantpur Bridge over Yamuna river
  - Noida
    - Sector 128 (near Chak Basantpur)
    - Jhansi Rani Laxmi Bai Marg
    - Noida–Greater Noida Expressway cloverleaf interchange
    - Gejha Road and Vishwakrama Road
    - Dadri Main Road
    - FNG interchange (between Noida Sector 141 and 143)
    - Habibpur village
    - Noida–Greater Noida Link Road
      - Tusyana village
      - Gulistanpur village
    - Along Delhi-Mumbai Western DFC
      - Greater Noida railway station (Boraki)
      - Datawali village
    - Beel Akbarpur village (EPE and NH-334C cloverleaf interchange)

=== Phase-2 Extension ===
==== Main route ====
Ghaziabad-Tronica Expressway (GTE): This 65 km extension of FNG to connect it with UER-II Alipur-Tronica Extension has been approved. Existing UER-II already forms the northwest and southwest quadrants, FNG forms the southeast quadrant around Delhi, and GTE will form the northeast quadrant.

The route, falling entirely in Ghaziabad district, is as follows (from east to west):

- Ghaziabad district
  - Along Hindon River via the following
    - Hindan Vihar interchange of FNG and NH-334C.
    - GDA Colony (west of the colony)
  - Hindon Airport (east-north quarter-circle)
    - Hindon airport eastern side:
      - CHRIST University Ghaziabad (west of CHRIST University): via Taj Highwa, Vishwakrama Road, along Hindon River on Raj Nagar Extension Road.
      - The Aurum
    - Hindon airport north side:
      - Ristal village: north of Hindon Airport
      - Kotwalpur village
      - Chirauri Village
  - Tronica City on Delhi–Saharanpur–Dehradun Expressway in Agraula village of Loni area: where GTE connects to UER-II Phase-4 Extension (Alipur-Tronica) to form a ring another road around Delhi.

==== Spurs ====
Proposed but not yet approved as of July 2025:

- Dilshad Colony-Hindon-Khajuri Road (DHK Expressway) spur (listed from south to north):
  - Begin at Delhi Road (between Dilshad Colony and Shalimar Garden in Ghaziabad)
  - via 80 feet Road to Wazirabad Road,
  - Hindon Airport Civil Enclave and southwest of Hindon Airport to Panchsheel Enclave
  - Jawli village
  - Chirauri village (interchange with GTE main route),
  - Singoli Taga village (Eastern Peripheral Expressway (EPE) interchange)
  - Rasoolpur Dhaulri village
  - Khajuri village (NH334B interchange).

== Inter-connectivity ==
Following will either connect to or will provide an alternate route to the FNG Expressway:

- Okhla-Noida SEZ Expressway i.e. Aghapur-Bhangel Elevated Road: from Aghapur near southeast corner of Okhla Bird Sanctuary to Bhangel (Noida SEZ).
- Chilla-Okhla Expressway i e. Chilla-Shahadra Drain Elevated Road: from DND Flyway at Chilla, then over and along the Shahdara Drain to Okhla Bird Sanctuary (beginning of Noida-Greater Noida Expressway and Noida-Greater Noida Bundh Expressway).
- Noida-Greater Noida Bundh Expressway: nearly 25 km long, INR 400 crore, 6-lane expressway between Yamuna river and existing Noida-Greater Noida Expressway will run over the bundh (flood prevention embankment) from Noida Sector-94 (southeast corner of Okhla bird sanctuary) to Noida Sector-168. Near sector 94, it will start from the existing Noida-Greater Noida Expressway, then along the way near Gulavali & sector 160 will interchange with Gulavali-LG Chowk road, and end near sector 168 at Faridabad–Noida–Ghaziabad Expressway (FNG).

== Current status ==
- Phase-1 FNG - Surajkund-Faridabad-Noida-Ghaziabad section:
  - 2025 Jun: Out of greenfield expressway's total 56 km length, 45% of 28 km Haryana section was complete in June 2025. Of the total 28 km Uttar Pradesh section, only 15% (3 km) section in Noida was operational since 2014 with no further progress. The construction of remaining route in both states by the respective PWD (Public Works Department) of both states, including overbridge on Agra Canal in Faridabad and Chak Mangrola bridge on Yamuna on the border of two states, will recommence by the end of 2025 after the approval of the respective revised cost estimates by each state.

- Phase-2 GTE - Ghaziabad-Tronica (Loni/Agruala) Expressway section:
  - 2025 Jun: Tender for appointing consultant for preparing the DPR floated after budget for DPR was approved.

== See also ==
- Circular roads around Delhi: Ring, Regional and Zonal Highways
  - Inner Ring Road, Delhi
  - Outer Ring Road, Delhi
  - Urban Extension Road-II
  - Western Peripheral Expressway
- Expressways of India
  - Expressways in Haryana
  - Expressways in Uttar Pradesh
  - Delhi–Meerut Expressway
  - Delhi–Amritsar–Katra Expressway
  - Yamuna Expressway
  - Najafgarh Drain Highway
