= Urban Extension Road-II =

Part of Delhi–Mumbai Expressway in India

Route information
- Length: 75.7 km (47.0 mi)
- Existed: 17 August 2025–present

Major junctions
- North end: Alipur
- South end: Mahipalpur

Location
- Country: India
- States: Delhi and Haryana
- Major cities: Delhi, Bahadurgarh, Sonipat

Highway system
- Roads in India; Expressways; National; State; Asian

Urban Extension Road-II (UER II) (NH-344M) is a 75.7 km long, 6 laned (with 6 service lanes), grade separated expressway in Delhi NCR in India. It begins from National Highway 44 at Alipur then passes from Rohini, Mundka, Najafgarh, Dwarka and end at Delhi–Gurgaon Expressway on National Highway 48 near Mahipalpur. Its main route forms a semicircle on the western side of Delhi, additionally it has two 4-lane side spurs - one from Bawana in Northwest Delhi to Sonipat in Bawana's North and second in west Delhi from between Tikri border & Najafgarh to NH9 Bahadurgarh south bypass.

Delhi NCT has 4 concentric ring roads around it - namely Inner Ring Road; Outer Ring Road; third ring outside it formed by the combination of UER-II & Chilla-Okhla Expressway, and fourth ring formed by the combination of part of Dwarka Expressway (from Tikampur) & Gurugaon-Ghata Expressway, Gurgaon-Sohna Elevated Corridor Expressway, Sohna-Faridabad section of Delhi–Mumbai Expressway, Faridabad–Noida–Ghaziabad Expressway (FNG), Ghaziabad-Narela Expressway (planned) and Rai-Narela-Bahadurgarh-Gurgaon Expressway (meet Dwarka Expressway at Tikampur in Gurugaon). Outside these ring roads, NCR region will have 3 Regional Circular Expressways (first of which is the existing combination of WPE and EPE) and 3 Zonal Circular Expressways (ZCE).

== History ==
In the year 2000, DDA's NCR Transport Plan 2021 conceived the UER-II project, which did not materialize due to financial viability and land procurement problems. In 2018, NHAI took over the implementation of UER-II phase-1 on payment of INR4000 crore financial viability gap funding by DDA, while DDA itself simultaneously undertook the construction of phase-2. Phase-I from Alipur-Bahadurgarh-NajafGarh-IGI, constructed by the NHAI, cost approximately ₹7,716 crores.

== Route ==
The access-controlled UER-II expressway project phase 1 & 2 have a main 74.98 km long 6-lane semi-circular route on western side of Delhi NCT, with two additional spurs - the 29.6 km long 4-lane Bawana-Sonipat spur in northwest and second 7.3 km long 6-lane Najafgarh-Bahadurgarh spur in west. UER-II is an at grade expressway with elevated flyovers at intersections.

=== Phase-1: Alipur-Bahadurgarh-Najafgarh-IGI ===
==== Phase-1 main route: western semi-circle ====
  - UER-II begins in north from NH44 between Bankoli & Alipur, and then via Bawana Industrial Area, Rohini, Mundka, Bakkarwala, Najafgarh and meets Dwarka Expressway near ICC & IGI Airport tunnel, end at NH48 Shiv Murti on eastern end of IGI. 75.7 km long covers northwest quadrant from NH44 Alipur to NH48 IGI Airport Shiv Murti:

==== Phase-1 spurs ====
  - Bawana-Sonipat spur: from Bawana in northwest Delhi to its north to Barwasani at 352A in Sonipat in Haryana. Completed in 2025.
  - Delhi–Amritsar–Katra Expressway extension to UER-II: 20 km long section, from Nilauthi village north of Bahadurgarh to UER-II near Kanjhawala, will cost INR2,500 cr. DPR was being prepared for this section in March 2025, which will be ready by Sept-Oct 2025.
  - Najafgarh-Bahadurgarh spur (Barwasni Bypass): from UER north of Najafgarh to its northwest to 9 Bahadurgarh south bypass. Completed in 2025.

=== Phase-2: IGI-Vasant Kunj-Tuglaqabad ===
==== Phase-2 main route: southeast quadrant ====
  - Rangpuri Bypass Expressway (Shiv Murti - Vasant Kunj Tunnel): 6-lane expressway from Shiv Murti to Nelson Mandela Marg in Vasant Kunj with interchanges at Andheria Mor and NH148A Anuvrat Marg-Mehraul intersection, then Mehrauli to Badarpur at NH19. It will connect to Dwarka Expressway and NH-48.
  - Rangpuri-Mahrauli-Badarpur Expressway (upgrade of exiting Mehrauli-Badarpur Road to signal-free road with flyways on intersections): 6-lane expressway from Rangpuri Bypass, via Saket-Mehrauli-Tughlakabad, to Badarpur interchange, with elevated corridor over the Vasant Vihar T-section, Khanpur, Hamdard Nagar and Maa Anandmayi Marg intersections.
  - Jaitpur-Asgarpur Jagir Bypass: From Jaitpur Mod on NH-148NA, via Jaitpur and over the Yamuna, to connect to Noida-Greater Noida Bundh Expressway (at Asgarpur Jagir) and Vishwakarma Road in Noida.

==== Phase-2 spurs ====
  - Vasant Kunj-Bandhwari Elevated Expressway, 25-20 km long: To ease the congestion on NH-48, the NHAI will build an elevated expressway connecting Vasant Kunj’s Nelson Mandela Marg to Gwal Pahari and Bandhwari on Gurugram-Faridabad Road. In April 2025, the DPR was being prepared.
  - Over the Yamuna:
    - Okhla Head-DLF Mall of India Expressway: from Okhla Head to DLF Mall of India (Noida Film City) on Noida–Greater Noida Expressway.
    - Sarita Vihar-Amrapali Sapphire Expressway: from Maa Anandmayee Marg, Jyoti Marg, Sarita Vihar, JJ Colony, over the Yamuna, to Raipur Khadar (Noida-Greater Noida Bundh Expressway) and Amrapali Sapphire.
    - Sirajkund-Palla-Sarita Vihar-Amrapali Sapphire Expressway: from Surajkund-Badkhal Road, Gurukul Road, Tilpat Road, Palla, Vinay Nagar, over the Yamuna, to Chak Basantpur (Noida-Greater Noida Bundh Expressway) and Max Super Speciality Hospital (on Jhansi Rani Laxmi Bai Road in Noida).
    - Badshahpur-Sirajkund-Palla-Sarita Vihar-Amrapali Sapphire Expressway: from Badshahpur (Mata Amritanandamayi Road), via Dadasiya Tyagi Road and Dadasiya, to Advant Navis Business Park in Noida (Noida-Greater Noida Bundh Expressway and Noida–Greater Noida Expressway).

=== Phase-3: Tuglaqabad-Okhla-Tronica ===
==== Phase-3 main route: eastern side ====
Badarpur-Noida-Chilla-Okhla-Akshardham-Gurudwara Nanaksar (Sonia Vihar)-Loni-Tronica City (Mandaula) section: Connects Delhi-Dehradun Expressway (Mavikala in north) to Noida (connect to Noida-Greater Noida Bundh Expressway south of Okhla Bird Sanctuary), between the eastern bank of Yamuna and NH-709B. DPR was being prepared for this section in March 2025, which will be ready by Sept-Oct 2025.

- Planned
  - Badarpur-Noida Expressway (BNE): from Badarpur interchange, over the yamuna river via new bridge, to Noida-Greater Noida Bundh Expressway (NGNBE) at Asgarpur Jagir & Noida-Greater Noida Expressway (NGNE) at Noida Sector-98 interchange - both of which converge at Okhla Bird Sanctuary.
- Existing
  - Chilla-Okhla Sanctuary-Akshardham-Gurudwara Nanaksar Expressway (i.e. Chilla-Shahadra Drain Elevated Road): from Noida end of DND Flyway at Chilla, then over and along the Shahdara Drain to Okhla Bird Sanctuary (beginning of Noida-Greater Noida Expressway and Noida-Greater Noida Bundh Expressway), to via Akshardham temple and then to Gurudwara Nanaksar T-Point.
- Planned
  - Sonia Vihar-Mandaula section (Nanaksar T-Point to Tronica City) to connect to Delhi–Saharanpur–Dehradun Expressway at Tronica City: from Nanaksar T-Point in Sonia Vihar to Loni and Mandaula. In June 2025, Delhi PWD commenced a feasibility study for the 5.5-kilometre-long elevated corridor on Sonia Vihar Pusta Road in northeast Delhi from Nanaksar Gurudwara T-Point to the Delhi-Uttar Pradesh Border (Tronica City), the land is owned by various departments of Delhi government and this road will be built entirely on the east of Yamuna (Trans-Yamuna).

==== Phase-3 spurs ====
  - Burari-Loni-Ghaziabad-Okhla - North Delhi-Ghaziabad inner loop: will pass through Khanpur Japti, Loni, south of Hindon Airport, Chaudhary Charan Singh Marg (Bhopura, Saheed Nagar, Kaushambhi & Ghazipur), and via Ghazipur Road to DND Flyway.
  - Agraula-Jawli-Ghaziabad Expressway - North Delhi-Ghaziabad outer loop: Alipur-Burari-Agraula will continue to Jawli and then to NH9 Morti interchange in Ghaziabad where it will meet Faridabad-Noida-Ghaziabad Expressway (FNG).

=== Phase-4: Tronica-Alipur ===
==== Phase-4 main route: northeastern quadrant ====
  - Alipur-Burari-Agraula-Expressway: 17 km extension of UER-II from NH44 Alipur at Splash Water Park, via Hiranki & then along Bund Road, then Burari bridge over Yamuna river to Agraula (Tronica City) where it will connect to Delhi–Saharanpur–Dehradun Expressway and NH709B. DPR was being prepared for this section in March 2025, which will be ready by Sept-Oct 2025.

==== Phase-4 spurs ====
  - Signature Bridge-Wazirabad-Fatehpur Jat Expressway - North Delhi's Yamuna Western Bank spur: Begin at Signature Bridge on Outer Ring Road, and goes north via Wazirabad to Fatehpur Jat (on Alipur-Burari-Agraula-Expressway), and beyond to Yamunanagar-Ambala as part of proposed greenfield new New Delhi-Ambala Expressway. In November 2024, NHAI was preparing the DPR.

== Current status ==
- Phase-1 Alipur-Bahadurgarh-Najafgarh-IGI - completed and operational. Entire UER-II Phase-I 75.7 km Alipur-IGI became operational on 17th August 2025.
- Phase-2 IGI-Vasant Kunj-Tuglaqabad: under-construction. June 2025 - DPR ready.
- Phase-3 Tuglaqabad-Okhla-Tronica: under-construction, partially operational. June 2025 - Delhi-Dehradun Expressway section complete, some sections including bridge over Yamuna near Tuglaqabad and Expressway along Yamuna from Okhla Bird Sanctuary to the beginning of Delhi-Dehradun Expressway under-construction.
- Phase-4 Tronica-Alipur: under-construction: June 2025 - Tender for preparation of DPR floated.
- Phase-5 FNG and GTE: under-construction.
  - See FNG & GTE current status: UER-II Phase-1 and Phase-2 form the northwest and southwest quadrants, UER-II Phase-3 and Phase-4 form inner southeast and northeast quadrants of the third ring road around Delhi. Whereas the FNG (Faridabad-Noida-Ghaziabad) and GTW (Ghaziabad-Hindon Airport-Loni-Tronica-Agraula) form the outer southeast and outer northeast quadrants of another ring expressway around Delhi.

== See also ==
- Circular roads around Delhi: Ring, Regional and Zonal Highways
  - Inner Ring Road, Delhi
  - Outer Ring Road, Delhi
- List of expressways in India
  - Delhi–Amritsar–Katra Expressway
  - Delhi–Mumbai Expressway
  - Najafgarh Drain Highway
