= Environmental issues in Delhi =

Environmental problems in Delhi, in the National Capital Region, India, are a threat to the well-being of the city's and area's inhabitants as well as the flora and fauna. Delhi, the fourth-most-populated metropolis in the world, is one of the most heavily polluted cities in India, having for instance one of the country's highest volumes of particulate matter pollution. The air quality index of Delhi is generally Satisfactory (51–100) and Moderate (101–200) levels between March and September, and then it drastically deteriorates to Poor (201–300), Severe (301–400), or Hazardous (401–500+) levels in five months between October and February, due to various factors including stubble burning, burning of effigies during Vijayadashami, bursting of firecrackers burning during Diwali and cold weather. In May 2014 the World Health Organization announced New Delhi as the most polluted city in the world.

During the COVID-19 pandemic lockdown in India, the air quality in Delhi and water quality of the Yamuna and Ganges river basins significantly improved as industries were closed due to the lockdown.

Overcrowding and the ensuing overuse of scarce resources such as water put heavy pressure on the environment. The city suffers from air pollution caused by road dust and industry, with comparatively smaller contributions from unclean engines in transportation, especially diesel-powered city buses and trucks, and 2-wheelers and 3-wheelers with two-stroke engines. Another known cause of pollution is slow moving traffic due to frequent pedestrian crossings.

== Air traffic ==
South-Delhi lies under the flight paths of planes approaching Indira Gandhi International Airport. Each of the jets expels a large amount and variety of pollutants. The emission of ultrafine particles (UFPs) from the exhaust in particular is a major concern. As the air traffic in Delhi increases every year, so does the emission of exhaust from planes.

Noise pollution is primarily a result of motorcycle and automobile traffic. Water pollution and a lack of solid waste treatment facilities have caused serious damage to the river on whose banks Delhi grew, the Yamuna. Besides human and environmental damage, pollution has caused economic damage as well; Delhi may have lost the competition to host the 2014 Asian Games because of its poor environment. Delhi Pollution Control Committee (DPCC) is empowered to perform the functions to control pollution in the National Capital Territory.

== Air pollution ==
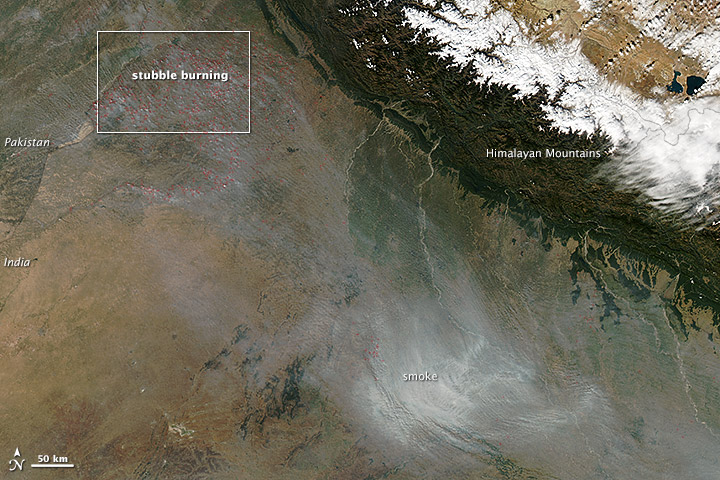
During the autumn and winter months, some 500 million tons of crop residue are burnt, and winds blow from India's north and northwest towards east. This aerial view shows India's annual crop burning, resulting in smoke and air pollution over Delhi and adjoining areas.

Air pollution in Delhi is caused mainly by industry and vehicles. As many as 10,000 people a year may die prematurely in Delhi as a result of air pollution. According to one study, Delhi citizens would live on average an extra nine years if Delhi met WHO air quality standards. The 1997 White Paper sponsored by the Ministry of Environment and Forests already proposed various measures to bring down pollution caused by traffic, including smoothing the flow of traffic with parking regulations and bringing down total traffic by mandatory limits on driving. City authorities claim to have had some success in bringing down air pollution; for instance, during the bidding process for the 2014 Asian Games, the city's organizing committee had claimed that "pollution levels had come down drastically in Delhi with the arrival of Metro rail as well as all public transport vehicle being run compulsorily on CNG(Compressed Natural Gas)."

For traffic related sources, growth in vehicle numbers and mileage seems to outpace efforts to reduce emissions. A study by IIT Kanpur states that the two most consistent sources for PM10 and PM2.5 are secondary particles and vehicles. Secondary particles themselves are generated by industry and vehicles. Road dust contributes significantly, especially in the summer. The EPCA report indicates that particles from coal and diesel are more harmful than wind blown dust.

Whilst vehicles and industry are the predominant source of air pollution, solid fuel combustion sources also contribute a small amount to air pollution in Delhi. Solid fuels are burnt for energy for cooking and heating as well as to dispose of waste. A range of fuels are predominantly burnt among deprived populations and include fuel woods, cow dung cakes, crop residues and municipal solid waste. The emissions from solid fuels have been shown to be significantly more reactive with the hydroxyl radical, more likely to result in production of secondary organic aerosol and more toxic than emissions from liquefied petroleum gas. Emissions from solid fuel combustion also contribute to organic aerosol, releasing many hundreds to thousands of organic components.

== Water issues ==
=== Yamuna River ===
The river Yamuna, the reason for Delhi's existence, has suffered heavily from pollution. At its point of exit from city limits, the DO level is only 1.3 mg/L. Similarly, coliform counts jump from 8,500 per 100 mL at entry to 329,312/100 mL at exit (for DO 5 mg/litre is the norm and for coliforms 500/100 mL). In 2007, roughly half of all the city's raw sewage went straight into the river. 55% of the city's 15 million people are connected to the city's sewer system and its treatment plants, but because of corrosion and clogging in the system many of the treatment plants do not run at full capacity. Waste from 1,500 unplanned neighborhoods runs straight into the river. In 2025, 23 Yamuna River sites failed a water quality test, according to a parliamentary panel report.

The Supreme Court of India took up the issue in 1994 after reports in the press, and since 2001 is actively monitoring the river and the city's efforts to clean it; in 2011, the national government announced a Rs 1,357 crore drain interceptor plan (all waste water is to be cleaned before it reaches the river) that would clean up the river by 2014.

=== Water sources ===
Underground hydrological resources are a substantial supplemental source of water in Delhi, especially in the affluent sections of the city. In the residential plots called the 'farmhouses' almost every household draws from this resource. Though water-storing rocks, i.e. aquifers, are renewed as surface rain-water percolates down, they are not inexhaustible. Delhi's aquifers stand in danger of depletion on account of excessive use. Furthermore, rampant construction activity has contaminated them with cement, paints, varnishes and other construction materials; leaky, poorly constructed and maintained sewage lines have added to the contamination. This is an irremediable loss, as aquifers, once polluted, cannot be decontaminated; they have no exposure to air and sunlight or to micro-organisms which clear-up chemical or biological pollutants.

Contributing further to underground water degradation are Delhi's mushrooming landfill sites. Waste material leeches underground, contaminating aquifers. Besides, land-fill sites degrade land. Delhi has twenty-five landfill sites, and more are planned.

A greatly ignored valuable wildlife habitat in Delhi are ponds (wetlands < 5 ha): over 500 ponds still survive in the city thanks to the city's policy to not convert any waterbody. These ponds sustain significant bird diversity despite considerable pollution.

== Loss of flora and fauna ==
There is significant dispute over the extent of the city's green cover. City authorities claimed in 2008 that the green cover had increased from 26 km^{2} to 300 km^{2}; moreover, the Delhi Forest Act stipulated that for every felled tree ten saplings need to be planted. Critics point out that the data as well as the meaning of "green cover" are unclear. The actual increase may be only half of what was claimed, and there are estimates that some 100,000 trees had been cut in Delhi, due in part to the construction of the Delhi Metro and the Delhi Bus Rapid Transit System. In 2012, the House Sparrow (Passer domesticus) was declared the State Bird of Delhi in order to aid its conservation. Though there are several general accounts of purported declines in populations of several bird species, data using robust monitoring is still absent making it challenging to suggest specific restoration that could benefit birds.

== Proposed solutions ==
The Delhi Development Authority (DDA) is not charged with providing "lung spaces". Of the city's 44,777 hectares, 8,422 hectares are reserved for "the Greens", of which the DDA manages more than 5050 hectares. There is a policy for afforestation, atmospheric pollution, bio-medical waste, domestic refuse, and water and sewage treatment. Additionally, there are action plans to encourage public participation in environmental problems.

Given the continued growth of the city and its population, problems are tackled only with difficulty—for instance, the Yamuna clean-up projects spent $500 million between 1993 and 2005, yet the river's pollution actually doubled during this same period.

Odd-even traffic scheme: To tackle rising air pollution in Delhi, the Government of Delhi has come up with a controversial odd-even traffic scheme. The first phase was in January 2016 for the first 15 days in the month. The second phase was from 15 April to 30 April. According to the notification issued by the government, from 8 am to 8 pm, vehicles with odd registration numbers were allowed to ply on odd dates and those with even registration numbers were allowed to ply on even dates. There was no restriction on any vehicle on Sundays. According to Delhi Chief Minister Arvind Kejriwal, if the scheme is a success, then it can be replicated every month, though no criteria of success or of failure of the scheme have ever been decided.

It was declared on 9 November 2017 that in view of the smog situation prevalent in the NCR region, the Odd-Even rule would be implemented again, starting 13 November and ending on 17 November.

Clean energy vehicles: The government of India introduced a plan to phase out all vehicles that are 10 – 15 years old and replace them with new models. All engines are required to meet the BS6 emissions target and be registered with a Non Polluting Vehicle mark. As per Faster Adoption and Manufacturing of Electric and Hybrid vehicles in India mission's the Delhi chief minister Arvind Kejriwal to introduce only electric and hybrid buses after 2020 in order to replace its cng only buses. Delhi Metro also improved its clean energy initiative for last mile connectivity with the introduction of 800 e-auto rickshaws.

Delhi Peripheral Expressway: Eastern Peripheral Expressway and Western Peripheral Expressway is expected to divert more than 80,000 trucks away from Delhi and reduce pollution of Delhi by 27%. It was inaugurated in May 2018.

Solar crematoriums: approx. 5% of Delhis air pollution is due to cremations with wood in the open-air burning places. Solar crematories aim to reduce this type of air pollution and reduce consumption of wood; using the same 60 square-meter large parabolic Fixed Focus reflectors, being used at 'India One', the first solar thermal 1 MW power device;

SC's Ban on sale of fireworks: Since air pollution spikes in Delhi during festivities for Vijayadashami and Diwali, on 9 October 2017 the Supreme Court of India banned the sale of fireworks—a main source of the spike—in the city.

The Delhi government announced that all schools in the National Capital Territory will remain closed from 8 November to 12 November, Sunday in view of the "unbearable" air pollution.

Paddy-straw-management '(R)-device' : With European technology, introduced before the rice harvesting season, October (2020), the Paddy-straw-management '(R)-device' will drastically reduce this type of air pollution and bring benefit to the farmers in Punjab and Haryana: 'waste-to-wealth'

Alternative water-conserving crops: In 2022, the Punjab Government announced they will purchase maize, sorghum, pearl millet, sunflower and mung bean crops at MSP, encouraging farmers to adopt less water consuming options as a sustainable alternative to paddy and wheat in the wake of fast-depleting groundwater.

Pedestrian rules need to be made and enforced strictly among the Delhi population. This will ensure free flow of traffic which will in turn bring down the pollution from vehicles to half.

Clean energy for transport: in 2019, DMRC proposed a master plan to power its whole system including stations and trains using solar energy under Renewable Energy Supply Company (RESCO). Over 27 MW of this energy is extracted from Rewa power plant in Madhya Pradesh with average of 345 million units (MU). The system is also focusing on rooftop solar energy where the lighting, escalators and other electrical supply is all obtained from roof mounted panels. Stats have reported that 60% of the system is running on solar power with 100% completely expected in 2021.

== See also ==
- List of most polluted cities by particulate matter concentration
- Air pollution
- Air quality index
- Haze
- Wet cooling tower
