= Mewla Bhatti =

Mewla bhatti
- Village
- Location in Uttar Pradesh, India Mewla bhatti (India)
- Country: India
- State: Uttar Pradesh
- Division: Meerut
- District: Ghaziabad district
- Named for: Rajkumar Baisla, Satbir Gurjar & Mahendra Fauji Baisla

Government
  - Type: Gram Panchayat
  - gram pradhan: Pradhan Mahesh Gurjar (District President- Pradhan Sanghatan Ghaziabad, U.P.)

Area
  - Total: 2.44 km^{2} (0.94 sq mi)
  - Rank: 01
- Elevation: 219 m (719 ft)

Population (2011)
  - Total: 3,000 (Votes 2,200)
  - Density: 200/km^{2} (520/sq mi)

Languages
  - Official: Kauravi & Gujari
- Time zone: UTC+5:30 (IST)
- PIN: 201102
- Area code: 0120
- Vehicle registration: UP-14

Mewla Bhatti is a small and Modern village in the Loni tehsil & block of Ghaziabad district of Uttar Pradesh, near the Siroli & Chirori region of Loni, on the GAIL indane Gas Plant (bantla, Loni) to Rataul & Chandinagar Air Force Station road.

The village had a literacy rate of 70.3% in 2011. The villagers are predominantly hard working farmers, Agriculture is the primary occupation. Villagers also serve in the Indian Army, Indian Air Force, Para Military Forces, Delhi police and Uttar Pradesh police. businesspeople like property dealers, Brick kiln Owner and builders. Once upon a time this Village is also famous for its dreaded gangsters of 1980s and 1990s like Mahendra Fauji Baisla and Satbeer Gurjar also for Olympian Wrestler and Coach like Rajkumar Baisla and Martyrs like Sunil kumar Gurjar
