= National Capital Region (India) =

Planning region in India

National Capital Region Rāṣṭrīya Rājadhānī Kṣētra NCR
- Capital region
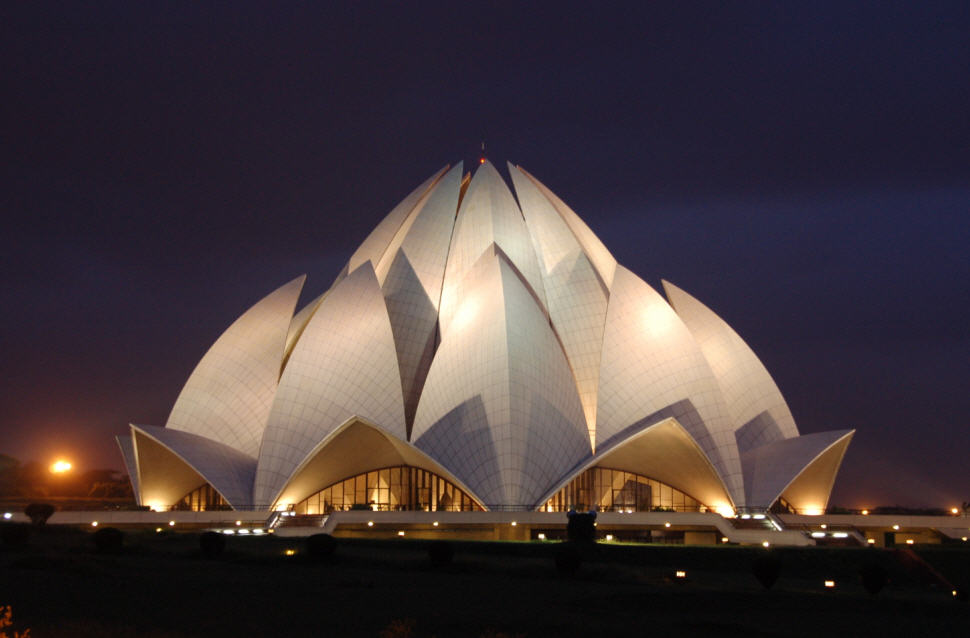
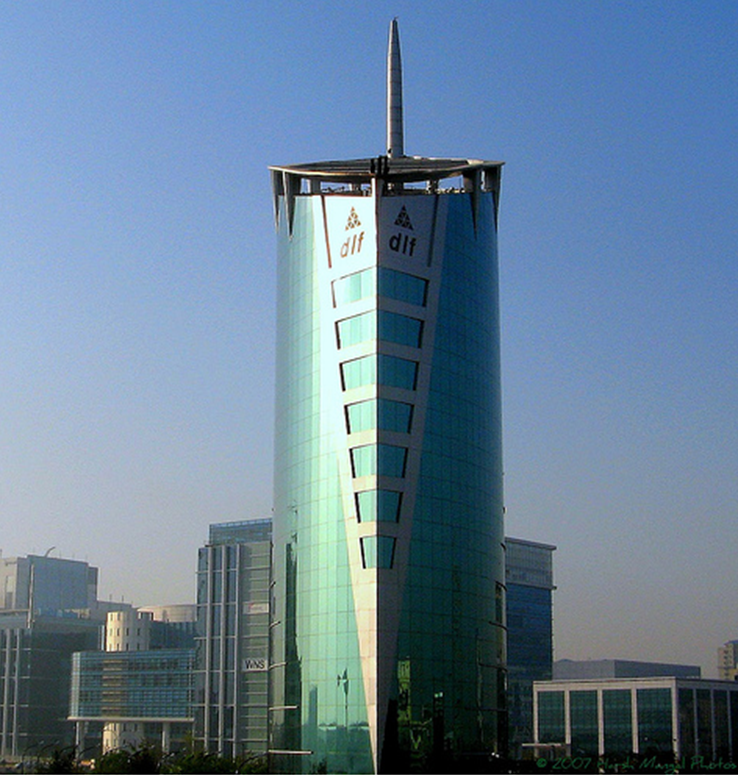
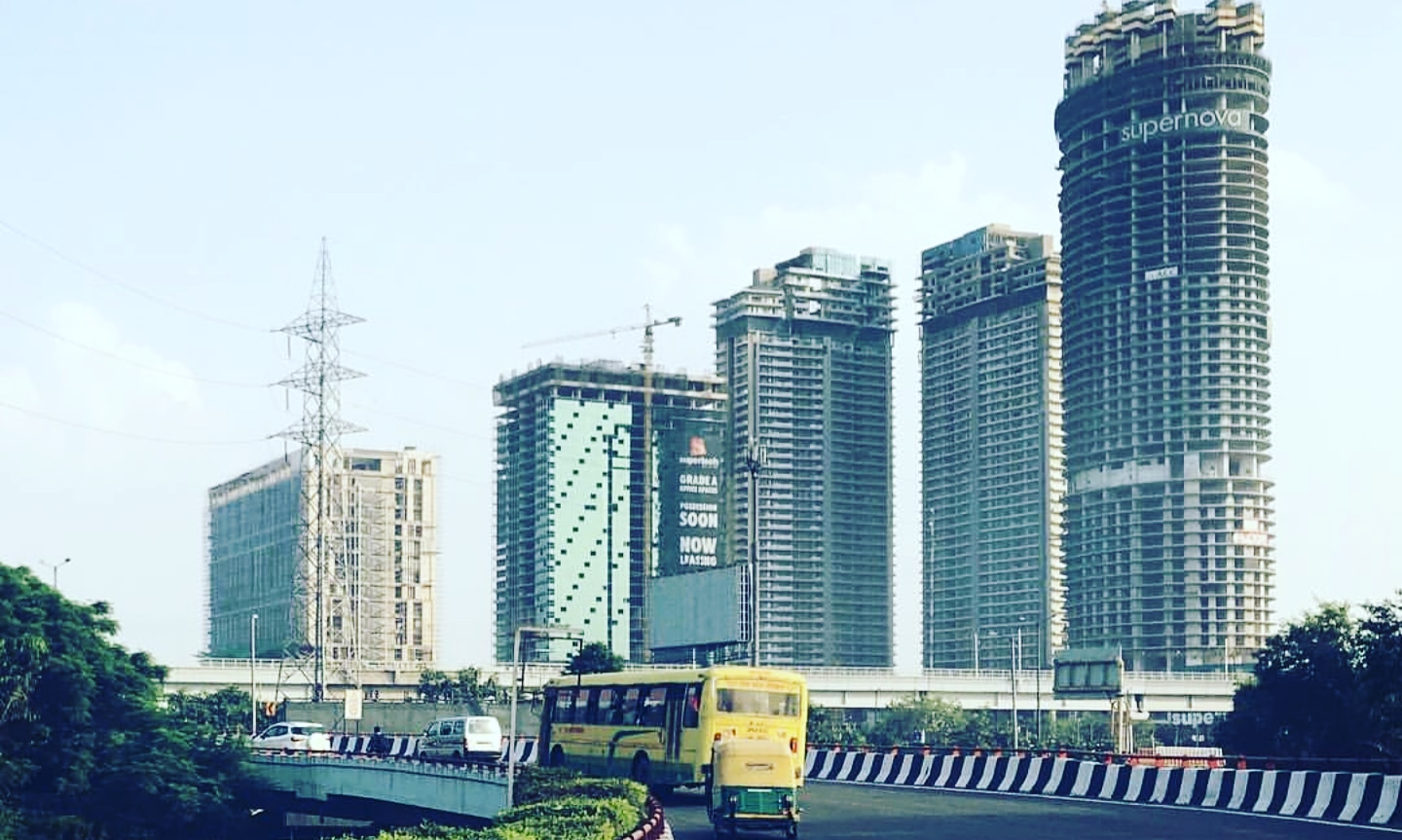
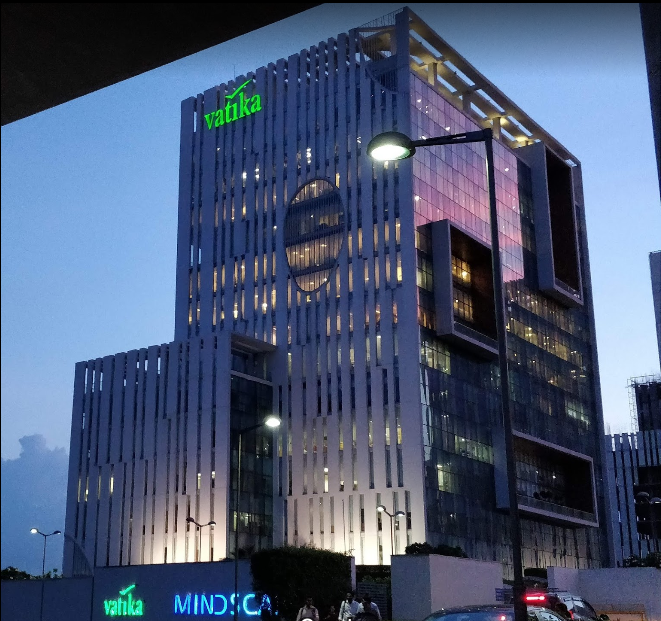
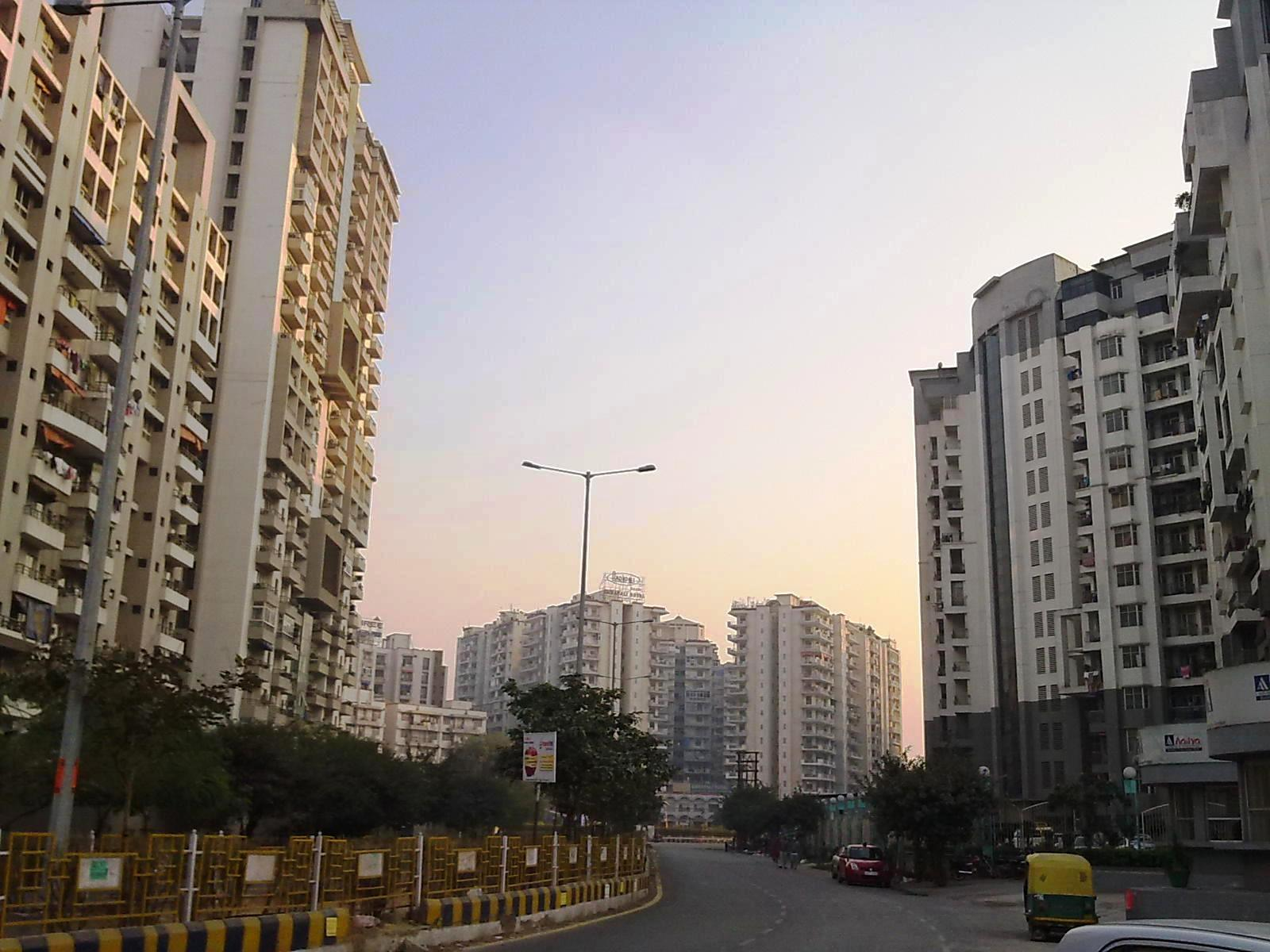
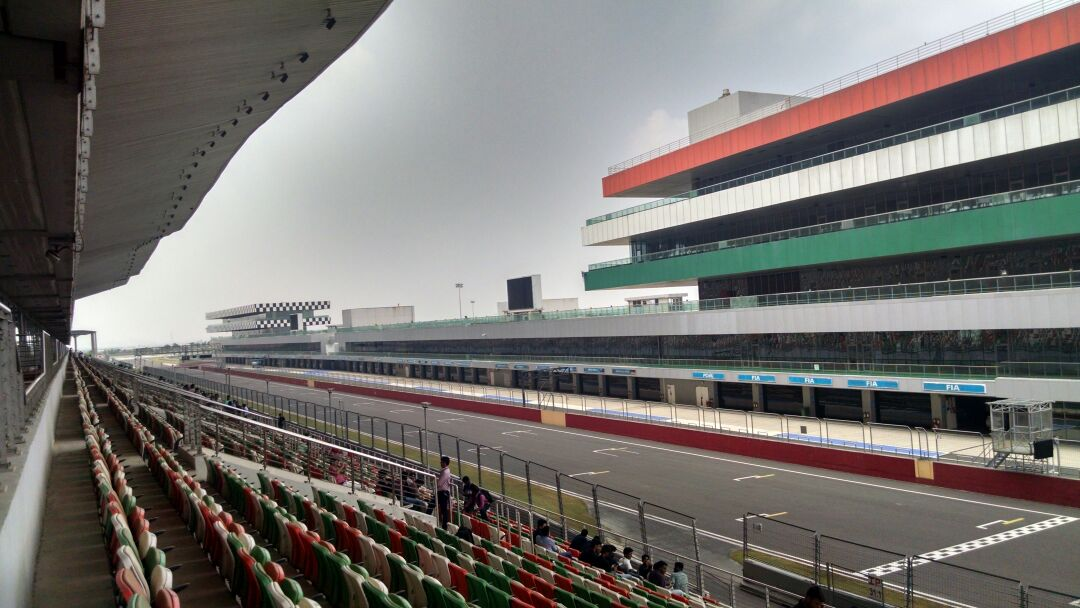
- Delhi, the core of the NCR Gurgaon Noida Faridabad Ghaziabad Greater Noida

- Location of the NCR in India

- Map of the National Capital Region, showing the union territory of Delhi (red) and states and the boundaries of their districts. The states shown are: Haryana (green), Rajasthan (blue), and Uttar Pradesh (purple).
- Interactive map of National Capital Region
- Coordinates: 28°39′38″N 77°06′32″E
- Country: India
- States: Haryana; Uttar Pradesh; Rajasthan
- Union territory: Delhi
- Created: 1985
- Major cities: New Delhi, Faridabad, Ghaziabad, Noida, Gurugram, Greater Noida

Government
  - Regional authority: National Capital Region Planning Board

Area
  - Total: 55,083 km^{2} (21,268 sq mi)

Population (2011)
  - Total: 58,157,286
  - Density: 1,055.8/km^{2} (2,734.5/sq mi)

GDP
  - Total: US$370 billion
- Time zone: UTC+05:30 (IST)
- Website: ncrpb.nic.in

The National Capital Region (NCR; Rāṣṭrīya Rājadhānī Kṣetra) is a region centred on the city of Delhi, a special union territory of India that hosts the country's capital city New Delhi. It encompasses the entirety of Delhi and a number of adjacent districts from the states of Haryana, Uttar Pradesh, and Rajasthan, mostly being a large connected metropolitan area. The NCR and the associated National Capital Region Planning Board (NCRPB) were created in 1985 to plan the development of the region and to evolve "harmonized policies for the control of land-uses and development of infrastructure" in the region. Prominent cities of the NCR are New Delhi, Faridabad, Gurgaon, Noida, Ghaziabad and Greater Noida.

The NCR is a mixed, rural-urban region, with a population of over 46,069,000 and an urbanisation of 62.6 percent. There are also areas like the Aravalli ridge, forests, wildlife and bird sanctuaries. The Delhi Extended Urban Agglomeration, the inner part of the NCR, had an estimated GDP of $370 billion (measured in terms of GDP PPP) in 2015–16. Despite being a part of the NCR, the Government of India's think tank, NITI Aayog, listed the Nuh district of Haryana as the most underdeveloped across India's 739 districts.

== History ==
The National Capital Region (NCR) and its planning board were created under the National Capital Region Planning Board Act of 1985. That 1985 Act defined the NCR as being the whole of Delhi; the Haryana districts of Gurgaon (then including the Nuh district), Faridabad and Sonipat, Rohtak (then including Jhajjar tehsil) and the Rewari tehsil then in Mahendragarh district; and the Uttar Pradesh districts of Bulandshahr, Muzaffarnagar, Meerut (then including Baghpat tehsil), and Ghaziabad (then including Hapur tehsil), and some part of the Rajasthan district of Alwar. The 1985 boundary of the NCR covered an area of 34,144 square kilometres (13,183 sq mi).

Prior to the creation of the NCR, an area described as the Delhi Metropolitan Area (DMA) was described in the 1962 Master Plan for Delhi. That plan defined the DMA as comprising the National Capital Territory and the ring towns of Ghaziabad, Faridabad, Ballabhgarh, Gurgaon, Bahadurgarh and Loni, also certain rural areas, which had a population of the somewhat less than 2.1 million in 1951. The following "Master Plan for Delhi", approved in August 1990, added Noida, Bahadurgarh and the then-proposed township of Kundli to the DMA, which consequently covered an area of 3,182 km^{2}.

Gautam Budh Nagar district was created in 1997 out of the existing NCR districts of Ghaziabad and Bulandshahr. The city of Noida was the location of the new district's headquarters. Also in 1997 Baghpat district was created from Baghpat tehsil of Meerut district.

In July 2013, the NCR was expanded to include three more districts, Bhiwani, and Mahendragarh in the state of Haryana, as well as Bharatpur in the state of Rajasthan. This brought the number of districts in the NCR to 19 (outside Delhi NCT), with the total NCR area increasing 34% to 45,887 km^{2}. Subsequently, Charkhi Dadri district was separated from Bhiwani district in 2016.

On 9 June 2015, the Government of India approved the inclusion of three more districts in NCR – Jind, Panipat, Karnal in the state of Haryana and Muzaffarnagar in Uttar Pradesh. covering a total area of 50,566 km^{2}. Shamli district of U.P. was added to the NCR in December 2017. As of 2021, there are a total of 24 districts in the NCR, excluding the 11 districts of Delhi.

=== Proposed extensions ===
On 9 January 2018, the government of Uttar Pradesh formally proposed the extension of the NCR to cover the districts Aligarh, Bijnor, Hathras and Mathura.

=== Proposed reductions ===
Under the "Draft Regional Plan 2041", it has been proposed to limit the NCR region to 100-km radius from Rajghat in Delhi for more focused and sustainable development of the region. Government of Haryana has requested NCRPB for at least one-third reduction of its share in the NCR region.

== Component districts ==
A total of 24 districts in three neighbouring states of Haryana, Uttar Pradesh and Rajasthan along with whole of the National Capital Territory of Delhi constitute the National Capital Region (NCR) of India.

The areas and populations (per 2011 census, prior to the addition of Muzaffarnagar, Jind, Karnal and Shamli) of these component districts are set out below:

State/UT	Districts	Area (km^{2})	Population	GDP (Nominal)
Delhi	Central Delhi	1,483	16,788,000	₹11.08 trillion (US$114.72 billion)
Delhi	East Delhi	1,483	16,788,000	₹11.08 trillion (US$114.72 billion)
Delhi	New Delhi	1,483	16,788,000	₹11.08 trillion (US$114.72 billion)
Delhi	North Delhi	1,483	16,788,000	₹11.08 trillion (US$114.72 billion)
Delhi	North East Delhi	1,483	16,788,000	₹11.08 trillion (US$114.72 billion)
Delhi	North West Delhi	1,483	16,788,000	₹11.08 trillion (US$114.72 billion)
Delhi	Shahdara	1,483	16,788,000	₹11.08 trillion (US$114.72 billion)
Delhi	South Delhi	1,483	16,788,000	₹11.08 trillion (US$114.72 billion)
Delhi	South East Delhi	1,483	16,788,000	₹11.08 trillion (US$114.72 billion)
Delhi	South West Delhi	1,483	16,788,000	₹11.08 trillion (US$114.72 billion)
Delhi	West Delhi	1,483	16,788,000	₹11.08 trillion (US$114.72 billion)
Haryana	Bhiwani	25,327	16,427,000	₹14.17 trillion (US$146.71 billion)
Haryana	Charkhi Dadri	25,327	16,427,000	₹14.17 trillion (US$146.71 billion)
Haryana	Faridabad	25,327	16,427,000	₹14.17 trillion (US$146.71 billion)
Haryana	Gurgaon	25,327	16,427,000	₹14.17 trillion (US$146.71 billion)
Haryana	Jhajjar	25,327	16,427,000	₹14.17 trillion (US$146.71 billion)
Haryana	Jind	25,327	16,427,000	₹14.17 trillion (US$146.71 billion)
Haryana	Karnal	25,327	16,427,000	₹14.17 trillion (US$146.71 billion)
Haryana	Mahendragarh	25,327	16,427,000	₹14.17 trillion (US$146.71 billion)
Haryana	Nuh	25,327	16,427,000	₹14.17 trillion (US$146.71 billion)
Haryana	Palwal	25,327	16,427,000	₹14.17 trillion (US$146.71 billion)
Haryana	Panipat	25,327	16,427,000	₹14.17 trillion (US$146.71 billion)
Haryana	Rewari	25,327	16,427,000	₹14.17 trillion (US$146.71 billion)
Haryana	Rohtak	25,327	16,427,000	₹14.17 trillion (US$146.71 billion)
Haryana	Sonipat	25,327	16,427,000	₹14.17 trillion (US$146.71 billion)
Rajasthan	Alwar	13,447	4,633,000	₹940 billion (US$9.73 billion)
Rajasthan	Bharatpur	13,447	4,633,000	₹940 billion (US$9.73 billion)
Uttar Pradesh	Baghpat	14,826	17,105,000	₹3.35 trillion (US$34.68 billion)
Uttar Pradesh	Bulandshahr	14,826	17,105,000	₹3.35 trillion (US$34.68 billion)
Uttar Pradesh	Gautam Buddh Nagar	14,826	17,105,000	₹3.35 trillion (US$34.68 billion)
Uttar Pradesh	Ghaziabad	14,826	17,105,000	₹3.35 trillion (US$34.68 billion)
Uttar Pradesh	Hapur	14,826	17,105,000	₹3.35 trillion (US$34.68 billion)
Uttar Pradesh	Meerut	14,826	17,105,000	₹3.35 trillion (US$34.68 billion)
Uttar Pradesh	Muzaffarnagar	14,826	17,105,000	₹3.35 trillion (US$34.68 billion)
Uttar Pradesh	Shamli	14,826	17,105,000	₹3.35 trillion (US$34.68 billion)
Total		55,083	54,953,000	₹29.54 trillion (US$305.84 billion)

== Regional planning ==
The planning body for the region is the National Capital Region Planning Board (NCRPB). It has issued two regional plans, the "Regional Plan 2001, National Capital Region" approved in 1988, and the "Regional Plan 2021, National Capital Region" approved in 2005. Topics covered by the 2001 plan included transport, telecommunications, power and water supply, waste and sewerage, education, health, the environment, housing and the "counter magnet" areas. The 2021 plan extended these with the additional topics of social infrastructure, heritage, tourism, rural development, and disaster management.

The 51% of pollution in NCR is caused by the industrial pollution, 27% by vehicles and 8% by crop burning, consequently there are plans to create a 1,600 km long and 5 km wide The Great Green Wall of Aravalli green ecological corridor along Aravalli range from Gujarat to Delhi to be connected to Sivalik hill range with the planting of 1.35 billion (135 crore) new native trees over 10 years. About 46% of the National Capital Region, home to 40 to 50 million people, is not connected to sewage networks. Sewage from these areas flows into stormwater drains that empty directly into the Yamuna.

A Sports University is proposed to be established in Meerut district of UP Sub-Region.

== Judicial System ==
Delhi NCR has only one high court, which is in Delhi. While it is highly suggested in Regional Plan 2041, Delhi NCR that high court bench must be set up in western Uttar Pradesh, large part of which falls in Delhi NCR. There has been long standing demand for high court bench in Meerut.

Regional Plan 2041, Delhi NCR suggests that industrial growth of western Uttar Pradesh's part of Delhi NCR is being hampered due to unavailability of judicial system. Almost 54% of all cases reaching the High Court originate from the 22 districts of Western UP.

People have to travel 700 km away to Allahabad for hearings. In fact, 6 high courts (Shimla, Delhi, Jaipur, Chandigarh, Nainital, Jammu) from other states are closer than Allahabad from western Uttar Pradesh. Even Lahore high court is closer than Allahabad.

== Transport ==
=== Namo Bharat Rapid Rail RRTS ===
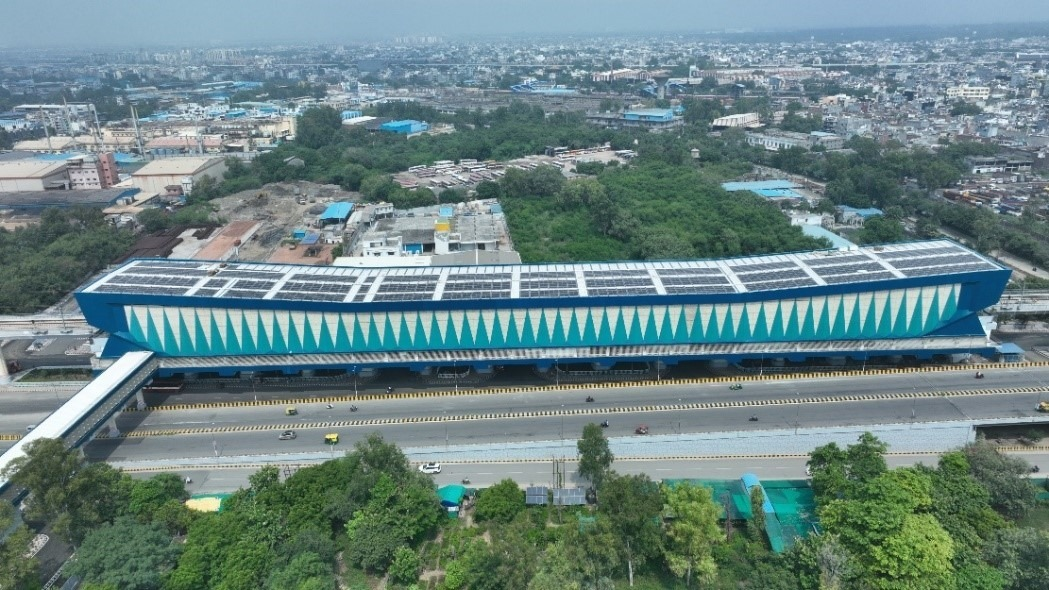
Delhi Meerut RRTS Station

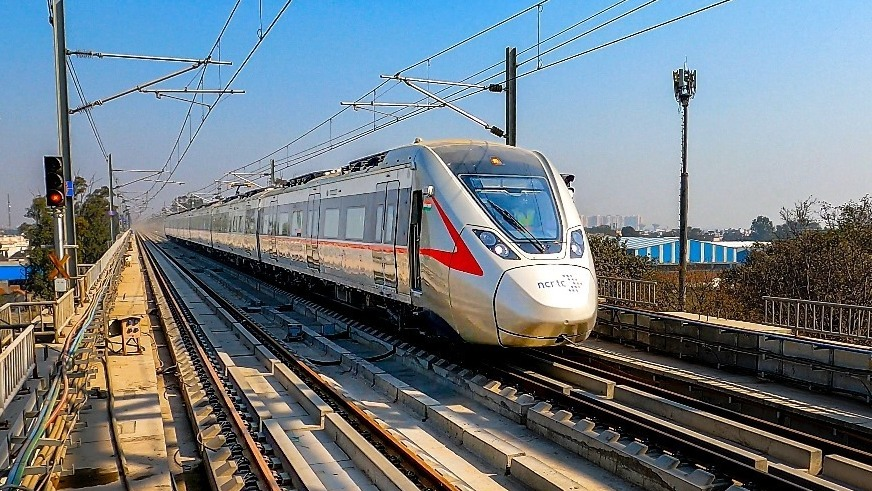
Delhi Meerut RRTS Trainset

For greater ease of transportation within the National Capital Region, India's first Regional Rapid Transit System (RRTS), called Namo Bharat Rapid Rail and Vande Metro, with 8 semi-high speed rail corridors is being developed in phases in Delhi NCR: an implementation of plans made by India's Planning Commission. The RapidX trains will have a maximum trial speed of 180 km/h (110 mph) and a maximum operational speed of 160 km/h (99 mph).

- Phase-1: First phase has the following 3 priority corridors:
  - Delhi-Meerut RRTS: It is an 82.15 km (51.05 mi) long line, India's first RRTS, which will be fully completed by 2025.
  - Delhi-Gurugram-SNB-Alwar (Pre-construction), expected to be completed by 2028. DPR has been completed and under review by the central government.
  - Delhi-Panipat-Karnal: expanded to total 136.30 km length from Delhi to Karnal (from original 103 km to Panipat) with 21 stations at a cost of Rs 33,051.15 crore, DPR is complete and under review by the central government, expected to be completed after 2028.
- Phase-2: remaining 5 proposed corridors of under original 8 Namo Bharat RRTS corridors.
  - Delhi–Faridabad–Palwal RRTS
  - Ghaziabad–Khurja RRTS
  - Delhi–Bahadurgarh–Rohtak RRTS: Route is from Munirka (Delhi) to IGI Delhi Airport T1, T2-T3, Yashobhoomi, Najafgarh, Bahadurgarh, and Rohtak. DPR preparation has commenced.
  - Ghaziabad-Hapur RRTS
  - Delhi-Shahadra-Baraut RRTS
- Phase-3: Other proposed Namo Bharat RRTS corridors.
  - Gurugram–Faridabad–Noida/Greater Noida Namo Bharat RRTS: DPR preparation has commenced.

=== Expressways ===
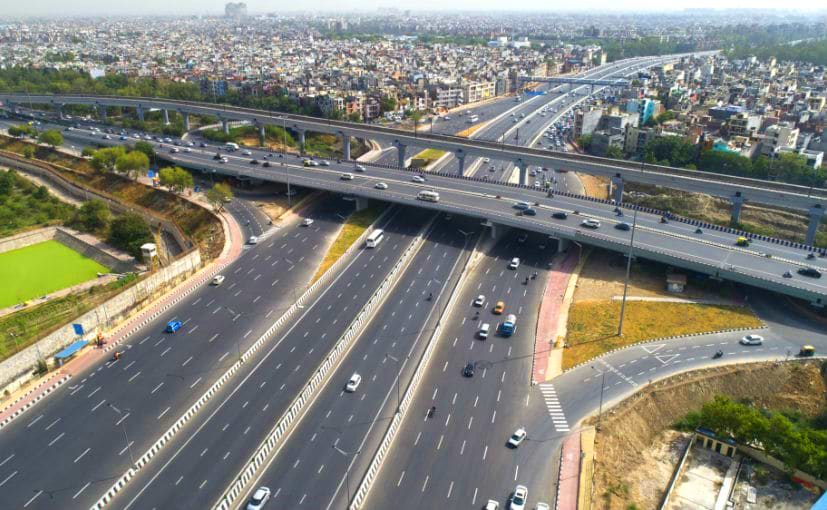
Section of Delhi Meerut Expressway

The region has the following operation and upcoming expressways -

- Delhi Meerut Expressway
- Yamuna Expressway (Noida.- Agra)
- Noida - Greater Noida Expressway
- DND Flyway
- Ganga Expressway (Meerut - Varanasi) (India's widest 14 lane expressway)
- Eastern Peripheral Expressway
- Western Peripheral Expressway
- Dwarka Expressway
- Delhi Mumbai Expressway
- UER 2 Expressway
- Delhi Dehradun Expressway
- Delhi-Amritsar-Katra Expressway

=== Dedicated Freight Corridor ===
For regional logistic transportation both Eastern Dedicated Freight Corridor and Western Dedicated Freight Corridor will pass through Delhi NCR. Sites like Meerut and Dadri are planned to be proposed logistic hub.

Ashok Agarwal, national president, Indian Industries Association (IIA), said "We have also received queries related to the allotment of land along the Ganga Expressway from investors. Most of the queries are for land in Meerut, Budaun and its adjoining areas".

- Meerut along Delhi Meerut Expressway
- Dadri Noida Ghaziabad Investment Region

=== Proposed Orbital Rail Corridor (ORC) ===
A total of three orbital rail corridors of proposed connected important districts of Meerut, Palwal, Sonipat, Noida, Gurugram, Faridabad and covering NCR area in circular fashion by rails for passenger trains and goods.

- ORC - I: Haryana developing ORC by 2025 connecting Palwal-Sonipat. Uttar Pradesh is also planning to develop ORC connecting Palwal - Khurja - Meerut - Bagapat - Sonipat, to complete the Orbital Circle 1. This is expected to be made fully operational by 2028.
- ORC - II: As "Regional Orbital Rail Corridor (RORC)" connecting Panipat- Shamli- Meerut- Jewar- Nuh- Bhiwadi- Rewari- Jhajjar- Rohtak- Panipat (along CREII) to enable fast regional movement of passenger and goods avoiding CNCR area.
- ORC - III: As "Outer Orbital Rail Corridor (OORC)" along CRE-III, is planned by 2041.

=== Railways ===
It is also proposed in Regional Plan 2041, Delhi NCR that all railway lines in NCR should be 4 tracks by 2030 and 06 tracks by 2040, 100% electrified, broad gauge and of high speed, with latest safety systems, Train Autonomous Cicrumambutation System (TACS), Centralised Traffic Control (CTC), etc.

=== Airports ===
Currently there is only one international airport, which is Indira Gandhi Internal Airport Delhi. Another airport, Jewar Airport Noida which could become one of Asia's largest airports once full operational is expected to be completed in 2025. Another airport in Dr. Bhimrao Ambedkar Meerut Airport is proposed in Regional Plan 2041, Delhi NCR.

=== Metro ===
The city has several metro transit system where the largest network being Delhi Metro which serves Delhi and other regions of NCR including Faridabad, Noida, Gurgaon and Ghaziabad. Noida Metro and Meerut Metro that are separately managed by Uttar Pradesh Metro Rail Corporation are the other transit metro systems currently in operation in the city. While Gurgaon Metro set to be operated by Haryana Mass Rapid Transport Corporation Limited is under construction.

== Central National Capital Region ==
The 2001 Regional Plan defined the "Delhi Metropolitan Area" (DMA) as comprising the controlled areas of contiguous towns of Ghaziabad–Loni and Noida in Uttar Pradesh; Faridabad–Ballabhgarh, Gurgaon, Bahadurgarh, Kundli and extension of Delhi Ridge in Haryana. The total area of DMA was 1,696 km^{2} (655 sq mi), excluding the area of Delhi.

Under the 2021 Regional plan, the Delhi Metropolitan Area was redesignated as "Central National Capital Region" (CNCR) wherein new areas were added. The CNCR comprises controlled areas of contiguous towns of Ghaziabad–Loni and Noida in Uttar Pradesh; Gurgaon–Manesar, Faridabad–Ballabhgarh, Bahadurgarh, and Sonipat–Kundli in Haryana. The total area of CNCR (excluding NCT of Delhi) is approximately 2,000 km^{2} (770 sq mi).

The 2021 plan estimated the 2001 population of the CNCR outside of Delhi to be over 2.8 million, while Delhi's population was 13.8 million, yielding a total CNCR population of 16.6 million. As of 2016 the most recent population estimates have spanned 25.7 to 26.5 million people.

== Counter magnets ==
The 1985 Act (§2.c and §8.f) gives the NCRPB the ability to select districts outside of the NCR to act as counter magnets, with a view to developing them further. Counter-magnet cities are identified as those that can be developed as alternative centres of growth and attract migrants to them rather than Delhi. The criteria for selecting counter magnet towns are: that they should have their own established roots and potential of growth, and should not be centres of either religious, strategic or environmental importance. The counter magnet cities should be given priority when allocating funding for development of land, housing and infrastructure.

Following are the nine Counter-Magnet Areas to NCR spread across six states:

- Hisar and Ambala in Haryana
- Bareilly and Kanpur in Uttar Pradesh
- Kota and Jaipur in Rajasthan
- Patiala in Punjab
- Gwalior in Madhya Pradesh
- Dehradun in Uttarakhand

== See also ==
- Mumbai Metropolitan Region
- Kolkata Metropolitan Region
- Chennai metropolitan area
