= Western Peripheral Expressway =

135 km long expressway in Delhi NCR, India

- Kundli–Manesar–Palwal Expressway
- Western Peripheral Expressway in red

Route information
- Maintained by Haryana State Industrial and Infrastructure Development Corporation (HSIIDC)
- Length: 135.6 km (84.3 mi)
- Existed: 19 November 2018–present

Major junctions
- South end: NH 44 / NE 2 in Dholagarh, Palwal
- List: NE 4 in Khalilpur; NH 248A in Kherli Kankar; NH 919 in Padheni; NH 48 in Manesar; NH 352W in Manesar; NH 9 in Bahadurgarh; NE 5 in Nilauthi
- North end: NH 44 / NE 2 in Kundli, Sonipat

Location
- Country: India
- States: Haryana
- Major cities: Sonipat, Kharkhoda, Bahadurgarh, Badli, Jhajjar, Manesar, Nuh, Sohna, Hathin, Palwal

Highway system
- Roads in India; Expressways; National; State; Asian

The Western Peripheral Expressway (WPE) or Kundli–Manesar–Palwal Expressway (KMP Expressway), is an operational 6-lane (3 lanes in each direction), 135.6 km (84.3 mi)-long Expressway in the Haryana state of India. Along with the Eastern Peripheral Expressway, the Western Peripheral Expressway is expected to divert more than 50,000 heavy vehicles away from Delhi, which will help to maintain good air quality in Delhi. Western Peripheral Expressway along with Eastern Peripheral Expressway completes the largest Ring Road around Delhi. There are 10 tolled entries and exits, from north to south - Kundli, Kharkhoda, Bahadurgarh, Badli, Farrukhnagar, Panchgaon, Manesar, Taoru, Sohna & Palwal. Toll rate notified in December 2018 is INR1.35 per km for cars, INR2.18 per km for light motor vehicles, INR4.98 per km for trucks and buses, and two wheelers are not permitted on the expressway.

Two kilometer belt on either side of this expressway has been notified as controlled zone where five new contiguous greenfield cities will be developed as part of Delhi-Sonipat-Rohtak-Gurugram-Faridabad agglomeration. Delhi Metro Phase-V entails a proposed new metro route along this expressway.

== History ==
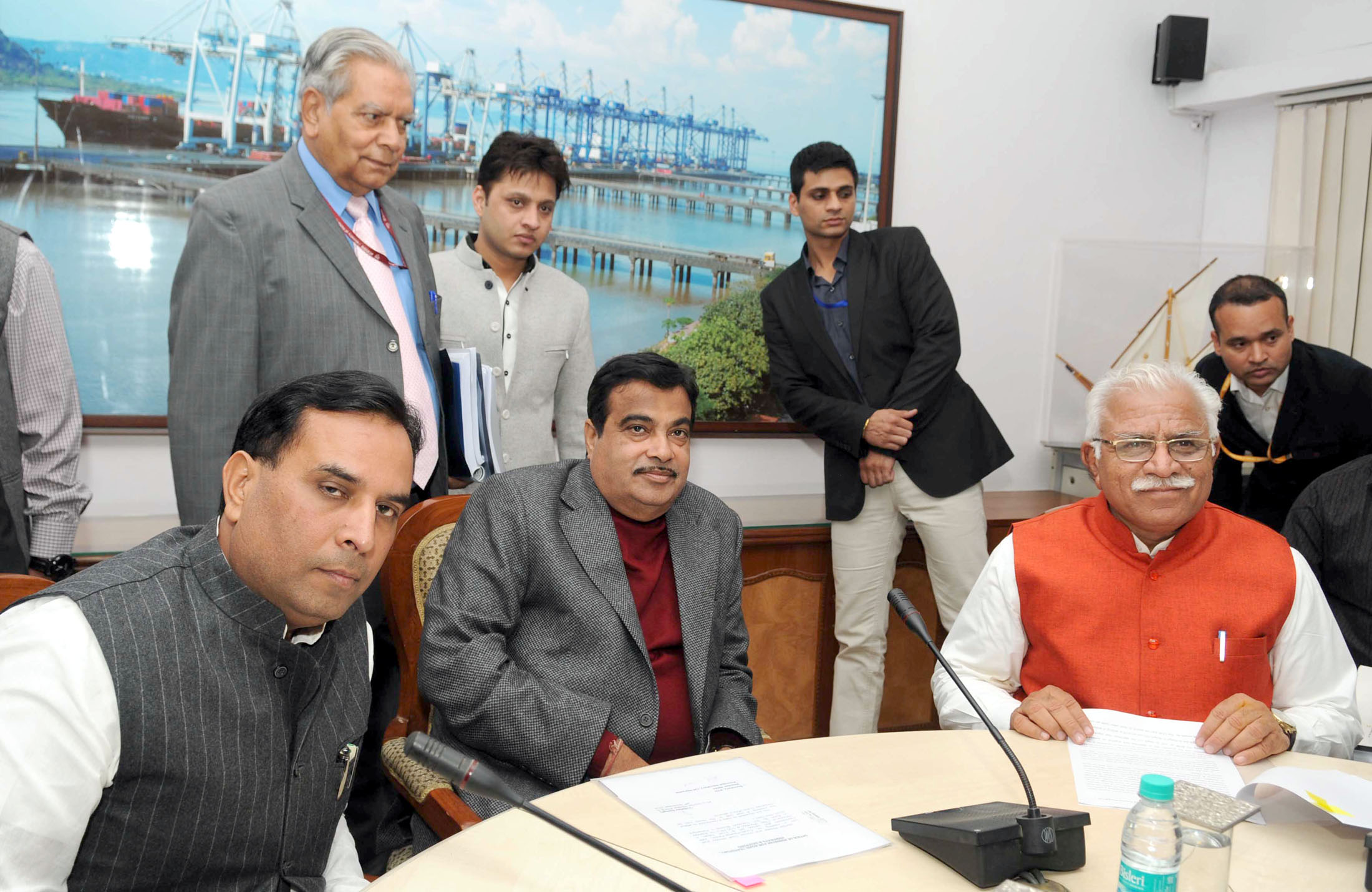
Review meeting on the Expressway held by Union Minister and Chief Minister of Haryana

The 53-km Manesar to Palwal section was inaugurated by Nitin Gadkari in April 2016. The remaining 83-km-long Kundli to Manesar section of KMP expressway was inaugurated by Prime Minister Narendra Modi on 19 November 2018. Toll plazas became operational on KMP Expressway in December 2018.

In 2003, the Western Peripheral Expressway was first proposed along with the Eastern Peripheral Expressway as a Build Operate Transfer (BOT) project to construct a 135.6 km, access controlled four lane expressway from NH-1 near Kundli, Sonipat to NH-2 near Palwal. Since Delhi would benefit from rerouting the vehicular away from it, Delhi state agreed to bear half of the land acquisition cost of the expressway. In 2006, the Haryana government began work on Western Peripheral Expressway project, when the tender was awarded to KMP Expressways ltd. with commercial operations supposed to begin in June 2009, which was revised to May 2013. In 2016, repeated delays forced the Government of Haryana to terminate the contract and pay KMP Expressways and lenders ₹1,300 crore (equivalent to ₹20 billion or US$200 million in 2023) as termination payment. In January 2016, after intervention of the Supreme Court of India, the project was revived and new bids were invited, and the plan was upgrade from four lanes to six lanes. The whole completed expressway became operational in November 2018.

== Route and Interchanges ==
There are 10 tolled entry and exit points. There are 52 underpasses and 23 overpasses, including the following:

- 4 railway overbridges,
- 10 overpasses and underpasses at crossings on the national highways and state highways,
- 7 overpasses, 9 underpasses and 27 underpasses at crossings on major district roads and village roads,
- 33 agricultural vehicular underpasses, 31 cattle crossing passages, 61 pedestrian crossing passages.

Interchanges from north to south are:

Location	Highway	Route	Type of road interchange	Corresponding Multimodel Passenger Interchange
Kundli	NH 44	Delhi–Panipat–Ambala GT-Road	Cloverleaf	Kundli MMTS
Kharkhoda	SH 18	Delhi-Bawana-Kharkhoda-Rohtak	T-Roundabout interchange & flyover	
Delhi-Amritsar-Katra Expressway	NE 5	Delhi-Kharkhoda-Amritsar-Katra	Double roundabout interchange & flyover	
Bahadurgarh	NH 9	Delhi-Rohtak–Hisar–Sirsa	T-Roundabout interchange & flyover	Bahadurgarh MMTS
Badli	SH 123	Jhajjar–Badli-Gurugram	T-Roundabout interchange & flyover	
Farrukhnagar	SH 15A	Gurugram-Jhajjar	T-Roundabout interchange & flyover	
Pataudi	NH 352W	Gurugram-Pataudi-Rewari	T-Roundabout interchange & flyover	
Panchgaon	NH 48	Gurugram-Bhiwadi–Rewari–Jaipur	Cloverleaf	Panchgaon Chowk MMTS
Taoru	NH 919	Gurugram-Sohna-Bhiwadi-Jaipur-Rewari	T-Roundabout interchange & flyover	
Sohna	NH 248A	Gurugram-Nuh–Ferozepur Jhirka	T-Roundabout interchange & flyover	
Triple Interchange Delhi-Mumbai Expressway DND-KMP Expressway	NE 4 NH 148NA	Delhi-Gurugram-Vadodra-Mumbai Delhi-Gurugram-Sohna-Faridabad-Palwal	Triple roundabout interchange & connecting road	
Palwal	NH 19	Faridabad–Hodal–Mathura–Agra–Yamuna Expressway	Cloverleaf	Balramgarh MMTS

== Facilities ==
The expressway has fuel refilling stations, 2 truck stops, 4 bus stands, 1 medical trauma centre with helipad, traffic police stations and 5 passenger multimodel transit stations (MMTS) with refreshment and recreational facilities.

=== Theme Cities ===
The Government of Haryana envisages development of profile land uses as Knowledge City, Medi City, Fashion City, Leisure and Entertainment Cities, Cyber City and Dry-Port facility along with other similar developments, resulting in establishment of five new cities 2 km wide on either side along this express way in public-private partnership (PPP) mode. Haryana govt has notified this plan and implementation started by inviting bids for preparing the Master Plan for the first city as 50,000 hectare 'Manesar Global City.

=== Multimodal Transit Centres ===
Haryana State Industrial and Infrastructure Development Corporation is building 5 Multimodal Transit Centres (MMTC) along this expressway at Sonipat, Bahadurgarh, Gurugram and Faridabad in the following places for which the land has been already acquired (c. Dec 2018):

From north to south:

- Kundli MMTS: Located at Kundli (Sonipat): between Rajiv Gandhi Education City and under-construction Delhi–Panipat RRTS station.
- Bahadurgarh MMTS: Located at Bahadurgarh between the bus stand and Bahadurgarh City metro station.
- Panchagaon Chowk MMTS: Located at Pachgaon Chowk in Manesar between the proposed metro station and under-construction Delhi–Alwar RRTS station, Gurugram–Manesar Metro and Jhajjar–Palwal rail line.
- Kherki Daula MMTS: Located at Kherki Daula in Gurugram near the proposed metro station, under-construction Delhi-Alwar RRTS station and bus stand on the junction of Chhapra and Naihati villages.
- Balramgarh MMTS: Located at Balramgarh (Ballabhgarh) between Raja Nahar Singh metro station, bus stand and Balramgarh railway station.

== Ring roads, Regional Circular Expressways (RCE) & Zonal Circular Expressways (ZCE) ==
Delhi NCT (national capital territory) is the area of Delhi state. Core NCR (CNCR), which also includes Delhi NCT area, is the area contained within and 5 km outside the circle formed around Delhi by the combination of WPE and EPE. Area outside of CNCR included in the NCR plan is called NCR Region. In addition to 4 ring roads in Delhi CNCR, the NCR Regional Plan 2041 also envisages construction of series of concentric expressways expanding away from and around Delhi which will be interconnected through several national and state highways originating from Delhi, which includes 3 Regional circular Expressways (RCE) within NCR region and at least 3 Zonal circular Expressways (ZCE).

- Ring roads in Delhi NCR.
  - Inner Ring Road: 40 km ring from Shalimar Bagh, Ashok Vihar, Punjabi Bagh, Rajouri Garden, New Moti Bagh, Hyatt Hotel, AIIMS Delhi, Lajpat Nagar, Kashmere Gate ISBT, ITO and Azadpur Mandi.
  - Outer Ring Road:
    - Salimgarh–Rohini–Okhla Outer Ring Road: 47 km long 6-lane highway, ends abruptly at Salimgarh Fort, hence Kalindi Bypass is constructed to close the loop.
    - Kalindi Bypass (Delhi Eastern Ring Road: along the western bank of Yamuna river from Salimgarh Fort to DND Flyway & Faridabad Bypass Expressway, with connection to Badarpur interchange along the way.
  - Third Ring Road: formed by the Urban Extension Road-II (UER II):
    - UER-II phase-1: from Alipur on NH44 in north Delhi to NH48 IGI Airport Shiv Murti.
    - UER-II phase-2: from NH48 IGI Airport Shiv Murti to Badarpur, via Rangpuri Bypass.
    - UER-II phase-3: from Badarpur to Noida-Greater Noida Expressway (NGNE), over & along Sahadra Drain, to Akshardham and Loni.
  - Fourth Ring Road (Delhi Elevated Ring Expressway) in Core NCR: This greenfield route will have following subsections, it will be partially elevated and rest at grade.
    - Kundli–Narela–Dariyapur–Bahadurgarh Expressway (KNDBE): begins in north Delhi at NH48 Kundli Drain No 8, via northwest of ITBP Camp at Saboli, west of Lampur, between Katlupur & Ghoga, Dariyapur, Jaunti, Garhi Rindhala, build a north bypass around Bahadurgarh, NH9 Bahadurgarh east bypass near UHBVN power station.
    - Bahadurgarh–Mitraon–Dharampur–South Gurugaon Expressway (BMDSGE): in the west from Bahadurgarh south bypass at Balaur, Mitrao, Pandwala, bridge over Sahibi River (Najafgarh drain bird sanctuary) between Jhatikara in Delhi to Dharampura in Gurugaon in Haryana, to Dwarka Expressway at Daultabad Chowk.
    - Gurgaon–Bandhwari–Pali Expressway (GBPE): southwest of Delhi via Dwarka Expressway (from Daultabad Chowk to Gurgaon sector 88 at Rao Sheoram Chowk), Gurgaon Southern Peripheral Road to Ghata, Bandhwari (realign existing Ghata-Bandhwari Rajesh Piolet Road so that it will not pass over the hill), Dera Mandi, tunnel between Jirkhod temple & Pakhal (or between Kholi Dham Temple & Pali).
    - Pali–Ankheer–FNG Expressway (PAFE): south of Delhi from Pakhal (or Pali), via Badkhal, to Ankheer Chowk where FNG begins.
    - Faridabad–Noida–Ghaziabad Expressway (FNG) - Ankheer–Badshahpur–Noida Sector 168–Ghaziabad (Rahul Vihar & Hindan Vihar Sewa Nagar): 56 km long, with 28 km in UP & 28.1 km in Haryana, from Ankheer, to NH19, Faridabad Bypass Expressway, Badshahpur, Dhadhar, Lal Pur bridge over Yamuna to Chak Mangrola, Noida sectors (sec 168 near Chhaproli Khadar, 150, 149, 122, 121) to NE3 Delhi–Meerut Expressway (near Rahul Vihar), to NH34 near Arya Nagar (in Hindan Vihar of Sewa Nagar in Ghaziabad).
    - Ghaziabad NPR–Loni–NH709B Expressway: from Ghaziabad NPR in west to Madhuban Bapudham–Raj Nagar Extension–Bhopura Road in Loni, to NH708B. Proposal has been sent by the Ghaziabad Development Authority (GHA) to NHAI in January 2023.
    - Ghaziabad–Singhola Expressway (GSE): from FNG, Raj Nagar Extension Road, NH9 NAI Colony, Farukh Nagar (northeast of Hindon Airport), to Singhola.
    - Narela–Singhola–Subhanpur Expressway (NSSE): from Narela at NH44 Singhola, via Jantipur, to Singhola (Delhi–Saharanpur–Dehradun Expressway & NH709B).
    - Spurs: either express or signalfree.
      - Ferozepur Bangar–Nahra–Saboli–Singhu Road: from between Saboli–Safiabad to NH44 Singhu between Kundli & Narela.
      - Kharkhoda–Fereozepur Bangar–Ghoga–South Narela Road terminating at Sri Balaji Mandir on Bawana-Narela Road.
      - Bawana–Kanoda–Jasore Kheri Road to connect with Delhi–Amritsar–Katra Expressway.
      - Kanjhawala–Bahadurgarh Road:
      - Badli–Ghevra Road: along the way interchanges Kair and also with Najafgarh–Bahadurgarh Bypass spur of UER-II at south of Neelwal. Connect to Ghevra-Kanjhawala Road at Ghevra.
      - Najafgarh–Badli Road: interchange near Mitraon.
      - Badli–Qutub Vihar Road:
      - Badsa–Najafgarh Road: with bridge over Sahibi river.
      - Badli-BSF Camp- Dwarka Phase-II Road: to meet UER-II on southwest of IGI Airport.
      - Bamnoli-Shobha City Road: to connect Golf Course Road in Dwarka to Dhankot.
      - Farukh Nagar–Meoka-Sihi Roard: for direct connectivity.
      - Palra–Bhondsi–Ghata–Chattarpur–Chandani Chowk Road: interchange with NH248A (Gurugaon–Sohna Elevated Road) at Bhondsi near Lemon Tree Hotel. Near Chattarpur it splits into two spurs to UER-II Phase-2 at two places – Mehrauli and Madangir (Shri Lal Bahadur Shashtri Marg to reach signal-free to Chandni Chowk). With a short spur as tunnel or elevated between Khshboo Chowk–Aya Nagar to Jaunaur to eliminate hill road.
      - Pali–Prithla–Hathin–Uttawar Road (Faridabad–Govardhan–Gwalior–Raipur Expressway): will continue as greenfield expressway to Punhana, Nandgaon & Barsana, Govardhan & Deeg, greenfield bridge over Chambal between Bari & Joura then to Gwalior–Orai–Chattarpur–Raipur–Katni.
      - Prithla–Mohna Road: to Jewar Airport. With Shahpura–Maujpur spur, Prithla–Badshahpur along DFC.
      - Ankheer–NHPC-NSEZ: From Pali-Badkhal-NHPC-Ninay Nagar to bridge over Yamuna–Basantpur–ATS village–NSEZ to FNG (near Habibpur).
      - Pali–Sohna: From Sohna (Baluda) to Delhi–Mumbai Expressway (at Paroli–Ghangola).
      - Wazirabad–Burari–Manauli–Bapauli Expressway: will begin at Shinghali bridge near Sangam Vihar along Bund Road to Burari (with another spur beginning from Wazirabadval9ng Wazirabad Rd & Raj Marg to Bund Road), to WPE interchange at Manauli, to NH709AD Bapauli in Panipat. With following spurs: Burari–Loni–Hindon–Bhopura, Burari–Agraula–Farukh Nagar, Ghazibad NAI Colony, UER-III to Bakhtawarpur, Singhola on Narela-Bawana Road to Janti Khurd to Agraula, from NH44 Drain No 8 junction to Khstkar along the drain to WPE interchange at Bahera.

- Regional Circular Expressways (RCE) in NCR: These will form the circular expressways around Delhi within NCR region.
  - Regional Circular Expressway-1 (RCE1): WPE & EPE: The combination of existing Western Peripheral Expressway and Eastern Peripheral Expressway together form an inner-most regional circular expressway around the Core NCR (CNCR).
  - Regional circular Expressway-2 (RCE-2) - Panipat–Rewari–Nuh–Jewar–Shamli:
    This greenfield route will run through Panipat (Samalkha–Israna), Shamli (Chhaprauli), Meerut (Barnava & Gulaothi), Jewar Noida Airport (connect to Yamuna Expressway at Tappal), Palwal (between Hathin–Uttawar), Nuh (Tajpur & Meoli), Bhiwadi (connect planned greenfield Bhiwadi airport at Tapukara), Rewari (Bawal & Kosli), Jhajjar (between Matanhail & Chhuchhakwas, Beri), Rohtak (Kharawar) and Panipat (between Samalkha-Panipat).
  - Regional circular Expressway-3 (RCE-3):
    This greenfield route will run through Karnal (Gharaunda–Kutail), Muzaffarnagar, Garhmukteshwar, Narora, Aligarh, Mathura (Vrindavan, Agra Airport, Govardhan), Deeg, Alwar (see Narnaul–Alwar Expressway), Mahendragarh (Baberi–Shamda, Gandala, Narnaul Airport, Kanina), Charkhi Dadri (east of Badhra, east of Jui Khurd), Bhiwani (east of Tosham, Bawani Khera, Garhi), Narnaund (Rakhi Garhi), Jind (Uchana), Kaithal (between Rajaund–Assandh) and Karnal (with spur from new bridge on Yamuna to Karnal Airport–Jyotisar).

- Zonal Circular Expressway (ZCE) will connect the NCR Counter Magnet Cities (NCRCMC) & other important hubs with each other.
  - Zonal Circular Expressway (ZCE1) – Hisar–Dausa–Agra–Roorke–Kurukshetra: Hisar–Neem Ka Thana–Shahpura–Dausa–Agra–Hathras–Sambhal–between Moradabad & Amroha to Bijnore–Roorke–Kurukshetra (Ladwa)–Narwana–Durjanpur–Kharkari–Hisar (Hisar Airport).
  - Zonal Circular Expressway (ZCE2) – Agroha–Patiala–Chandigarh–Haridwar–Bareilly–Gwalior–Jaipur-: It will pass through Agroha (Hisar), Dhanaurie–Cheeka–Patiala–Chandigarh–Yanumanagar (Naraingargh & Chhachhrauli)–Chhutmalpur–Haridwar–Bareilly–Firozabad–Pinahat–Morena (with Pinahat–Gwalior–Morena loop)–Sirmathura–Karauli–Lalsot–Jaipur–Neem Ka Thana–Sidhpur–Bhadra–Adampur.
  - Zonal Circular Expressway (ZCE3) – Bareilly–Kota–Dabwali–Baddi–Dehradun–Tikampur: will pass through Kalawali (Sirsa), Budhlada, Samana (Patiala), Adi Badri (Haryana), Kolar, Dehradun, Rishikesh, Lansdown, Nainital, Tikampur, Bisalpur, Bewar (between Mainpuri & Farrukhabad, Sheopur (between Kota–Gwalior).

== See also ==
- Expressways in Haryana
  - Delhi–Amritsar–Katra Expressway
  - Delhi–Mumbai Expressway
  - Delhi–Jaipur Expressway
- Expressways in Uttar Pradesh
  - Eastern Peripheral Expressway
  - Yamuna Expressway
- Other
  - Railway in Haryana
  - List of longest ring roads
