= Rajkumar Baisla =

Indian freestyle wrestler

Personal information
- Full name: Rajkumar Baisla Gurjar
- Nicknames: Raju pahelwan & Hanumaan pahelwan
- Nationality: Indian
- Born: Raju; 05 January 1966 (age 58) Mewla Bhatti Village, Loni, Ghaziabad (U.P.)
- Height: 166 cm (5 ft 5 in)

Sport
- Country: India
- Sport: Freestyle wrestling
- Event: 75 kg freestyle
- Former partner: Gyan Singh Pahelwan
- Coached by: Shrichand and Sardar Pahelwan

Rajkumar Baisla Gurjar also known as Rajkumar Bansal (born 1966) is an Indian freestyle wrestler. In August 2011, he received the Dhyan Chand Award – India's highest honour for lifetimes Achievements and he also got Yash bharti award (2014), Railways minister award (2013) and Laxman award (2021) by Yogi adityanath. He is the first gurjar to receive this award. Now he is incharge of Kishanganj Railways akhada and Coach of Olympian and international Wrestlers such as Sushil Kumar, Sakshi Malik, Yogeshwar Dutt, Bajrang Punia and Phogat sisters Under Northern Railways Training Camps.He is also sport officer for Northern Railways.

== Biography and achievements ==
Rajkumar Baisla has won 7 gold medals at the national and junior national level. He has also won silver in the 82 kg category at the Commonwealth Games, and gold in the 74 kg category at the Asian Games and the South Asian Games. He also represented India at the Olympic Games from 1985 to 1994. Rajkumar Baisla is currently working as a manager and coach at the Indian Railway Academy, New Delhi.

Baisla received the Dhyan Chand Award in 2011 from the Government of India, the Yash Bharti for sports in 2014 from the Government of Uttar Pradesh, and the Laxman Award in 2021 from the government of Uttar Pradesh.
