= Pachgaon (Manesar) =

Pachgaon is a cluster of villages that are 7 kilometres (4.3 mi) from Manesar in the Gurgaon district of Haryana state, India. It is made up of five small villages and is dominated by members of the Ahir community. The villages of Chandla (largest of the five), Fazalwas, Gwalior, Kukrola, and Fukharpur are commonly referred to as Pachgaon by locals although they are independent and have their own gram panchayats while Pachgaon is not mentioned in government documents. The distance from Pachgaon to the capital, New Delhi, is 70 kilometres (43 mi).

== ISBT ==
Inter State Bus Terminal will be made in Pachgaon. In November 2010, agricultural land was acquired at a price of 34 lakhs per acre for the same.

=== Protests for land acquisition ===
Kundli–Manesar–Palwal Expressway passes through Pachgaon. The Pachgaon to Palwal stretch has 15 flyovers and 75 minor structures like culverts, etc. Villagers want to change name of expressway to Kundali-Pachgaon-Palwal Expressway as it passes through Pachgaon not from Manesar. Farmers have staged protests and blocked NH-8 in the past. The HSIIDC is acquiring the lands for the second phase of IMT in Pachgaon at 30 lakhs per acre and villagers wants market rate of one crore as compensation. Irrigation and forest Minister Ajay Singh Yadav, an Ahir leader, the MLA from Rewari is against the acquisition of land by the government.

== Deforestation of Aravalli Hills in the area of Pachgaon ==
Most of the deforestation is happening in rapidly developing areas, where the growing population pushes for space. Pachgaon is one of the areas which is facing the illegal encroachments and uncontrolled urbanization.

These are also the terrains of the oldest mountain range, Aravalli, which is denuded of its native flora and is either a waste land or covered by invasive alien species. What is left is now being devoured by concrete. The possibility of any regeneration gets lost.

The Aravalli hills are being encroached and denuded, water bodies, ponds and natural rain water drains have been filled up and built over, underground water has been pumped out to build deeper basements, bore wells have been sunk in hundreds to pump water for the growing needs of the city.

There have been laws and measures for rainwater conservation, tree plantation, revival of ponds and water bodies. However most of these remain unimplemented in the face of the growth bulldozer. Saplings planted each year disappear under debris or for want of care and water before their first anniversary.

== Protection of Aravalli Hills - Call to Action ==
To protect the green terrains Pachagon, Aravindam Foundation and Haryali have taken note. To support the conservation and restoration of the region's green spaces, Pachgaon, the Aravindam Foundation, and Haryali have undertaken environmental initiatives aimed at protecting the Aravalli landscape. The objective of the NGOs working for Pahcgaon social and environment development, is to revive 300 acres of Aravalli biosphere, to sink greenhouse gasses from NH 8 and the KMP expressway and to regenerate habitat for the vanishing butterflies, birds, reptiles and mammals.

The proposed forest area in Pachgaon has been named INA Veterans Memorial Forest. A platform with the statue of Netaji Subash Chandra Bose has been created at the foothill of the village temple.

A granite plaque inscribed with the history of the INA and the names of the 32 INA veterans belonging to the Pachgaon village has been installed at the base of the memorial.

The Police Commissioner, Sh. Alok Mittal, planted saplings when the gram Panchayat dedicated the forest to the memory of their brave ancestors amidst singing of patriotic songs by underprivileged girls and boys from Gurukul Kalpataru.

Others who followed and responded to the urgent need of protecting the Aravalli Hills in Pachgaon are the employees of Domino Printech India Pvt Ltd who donated for 600 new saplings with drip irrigation at INA Forest, Pachgaon and participated in the great cause. Gwalior village is one of the major village occupied by the ahir community. Ahirs are known as descendants of the God Shri Krishna.

== Development in Pachgaon ==
- Amity Education Valley.
- Western Resort Country Club
- Sanskriti Bagh
- Pinewood Retreat
- Rapid metro planned by 2021.
- INA Veteran Memorial Forest by Prakriti - Aravindam initiated in 2013
- Gurukul Kalpataru by Aravindam - Basic IT skill development programs for village girls initiated in 2014
- Haatmake by Aravindam - stitching skills aiming at financial independence for the women of the community *Sonu Masala company in Pachgaon Gwalior

== See also ==
- Wazirabad (Gurgaon)
