= Chirori Village =

Village in Uttar Pradesh, India

Chirori Village is a village in Loni tehsil, Ghaziabad district, Uttar Pradesh, India. It is located 16 km north of Ghaziabad, 6 km from Loni and 485 km from the Uttar Pradesh capital, Lucknow.

The postal code for Chirori Village is 201102 and the postal head office is located in Tronica City.

== Demographics ==
According to the 2011 Census of India, Chirori has a total population of 8263, of whom 4351 (52.7%) are male and 3913 (47.3%) are female.
