= National Highway 534 (India) =

National highway in India

National Highway 534
- Map of National Highway 534 in red

Route information
- Length: 151 km (94 mi)

Major junctions
- North end: Najibabad, UttarPradesh
- South end: Bubakhal, Uttarakhand

Location
- Country: India
- States: Uttarakhand, Uttar Pradesh
- Primary destinations: Najibabad, Kotdwar, Satpauli, Bubakhal

Highway system
- Roads in India; Expressways; National; State; Asian
← NH 334C	→ NH 734

National Highway 534, commonly referred to as NH 534, is a highway connecting the city of Najibabad to Bubakhal.

Highway Number	Source	Destination	Via	Length (km)
534	Najibabad	Bubakhal	Kotdwar, Satpauli	151
