= National Highway 734 (India) =

National highway in India

National Highway 734
- Map of National Highway 734 in red

Route information
- Length: 108 km (67 mi)

Major junctions
- From: Najibabad
- To: Kashipur

Location
- Country: India
- States: Uttar Pradesh, Uttarakhand
- Primary destinations: Najibabad, Nagina, Dhampur Kashipur

Highway system
- Roads in India; Expressways; National; State; Asian
← NH 534	→ NH 934

National Highway 734 (NH 734) is a National Highway in India.
