= Eastern Peripheral Expressway =

135 km long expressway in Delhi NCR, India

Eastern Peripheral Expressway
- Kundli–Ghaziabad–Palwal Expressway
- Eastern Peripheral Expressway in red

Route information
- Maintained by National Highways Authority of India (NHAI)
- Length: 135 km (84 mi)
- Existed: 27 May 2018–present

Major junctions
- North end: NH 44 in Kundli, Sonipat, Haryana
- List: NH 709B in Baghpat, Uttar Pradesh; NH 34 in Duhai, Uttar Pradesh; NE 3 in Kallu Garhi, Uttar Pradesh; NH 9 in Dasna, Uttar Pradesh; NH 34 / NH 334C in Kot, Uttar Pradesh; NH 334D in Sihol, Haryana
- South end: NH 44 in Dholagarh, Palwal, Haryana

Location
- Country: India
- States: Haryana and Uttar Pradesh
- Major cities: Sonipat, Baghpat, Ghaziabad, Greater Noida, Faridabad, Palwal

Highway system
- Roads in India; Expressways; National; State; Asian

The Eastern Peripheral Expressway (EPE) or Kundli–Ghaziabad–Palwal Expressway (KGP Expressway) is a 135 km (84 mi) long, 6-lane wide expressway passing through the states of Haryana and Uttar Pradesh in India. The expressway starts from the Western Peripheral Expressway at Kundli, Sonipat, passing through Baghpat, Ghaziabad and Noida districts in UP and Faridabad district in Haryana before rejoining the Western Peripheral Expressway near Dholagarh, Palwal. Eastern Peripheral Expressway along with Western Peripheral Expressway completes the largest Ring Road around Delhi. The Eastern Peripheral Expressway was declared as National Expressway 2 (NE-2) in March 2006.

The expressway has been constructed at a cost of ₹11,000 crore (equivalent to ₹150 billion or US$1.6 billion in 2023) to relieve traffic congestion in the Faridabad–Ghaziabad stretch and also to prevent pollution causing commercial vehicles from entering Delhi.Government of India approved funding for the expressway in August 2015 on build-operate-transfer mode under NHDP Phase VI.

The expressway crosses India’s widest 14-lane expressway, Delhi–Meerut Expressway, and provides connectivity to Meerut.

Eastern Peripheral Expressway is expected to divert more than 50,000 trucks away from Delhi and reduce air pollution in Delhi by 27%. It was inaugurated on 27 May 2018 by Prime Minister Narendra Modi in Baghpat. An interchange connecting Eastern Peripheral Expressway with Yamuna Expressway at Jaganpur Afzalpur village near Noida International University in Gautam Buddha Nagar district has been under construction since August 2025, after being delayed for several years.

== Construction ==
The construction work of 135 km-long Eastern Peripheral Expressway was divided into 6 packages and was awarded to 5 different contractors. There are 406 structures including 8 railway-over-bridges (ROB), 4 major bridges, 46 minor bridges, 2 toll plaza, 3 flyovers, 7 interchanges, 70 vehicular-underpasses (VUP), 151 pedestrian underpasses, and 114 culverts. The total construction cost (excluding land acquisition cost) was ₹4,418 crores. The list of contractors is as follows:

Sr. No	Package	Length in km	Contractor
1. (Kundli end)	km 01.0 – km 22.0	21.0	Sadbhav Engineering
2.	km 22.0 – km 46.5	24.5	Sadbhav Engineering
3.	km 46.5 – km 71.0	24.5	Jaiprakash Associates
4.	km 71.0 – km 93.0	22.0	Ashoka Buildcon
5.	km 93.0 – km 114.0	21.0	Oriental Structural Engineers
6. (Palwal end)	km 114.0 – km 136.0	22.0	Gayatri Projects

== Salient features ==
This expressway boasts of many features that are being implemented for the first time in India.

- The 135 km-long Expressway has a closed tolling system in which toll will be collected only on the distance travelled, and not on the entire length.
- There is a provision for electronic collection of toll to ensure disruption-free movement of traffic.
- Weigh-in motion sensors on all entry points which ensure that over-loaded vehicles are not allowed to enter the Expressway. The sensors are installed at all entry points with two gates—one leading to the Expressway and the other redirecting the vehicle if it is over-loaded.
- Provision for parking of overloaded trucks where they can unload some of the cargo to satisfy the weight criteria and then move to the Expressway.
- To check for speed, cameras have been put up every 2 kilometres. Over-speeding vehicles will be issued the challan at the toll plaza and the challan amount would be added to the total toll amount.
- Facility for rainwater collection at every 500 meters has been made.
- 2.5 lakh trees have been planted along the highway along which will be watered through drip irrigation system
- A cycle track of 2.5 metre has been developed on both sides of the expressway
- Solar panels have been installed at various locations to provide power to illuminate the expressway. 8 solar power plants with a total capacity of 4,000 kilowatts (4 MW) have been made by the side of the expressway.
- 33% of the earthwork on the highway was done using fly ash from coal power plants thereby compounding its contribution to reducing pollution.
- The expressway has 406 structures of which 4 are major bridges, 46 minor bridges, 3 flyovers, 7 interchanges, 221 underpasses and 8 Railway-over-bridges (ROB).

== Status updates ==
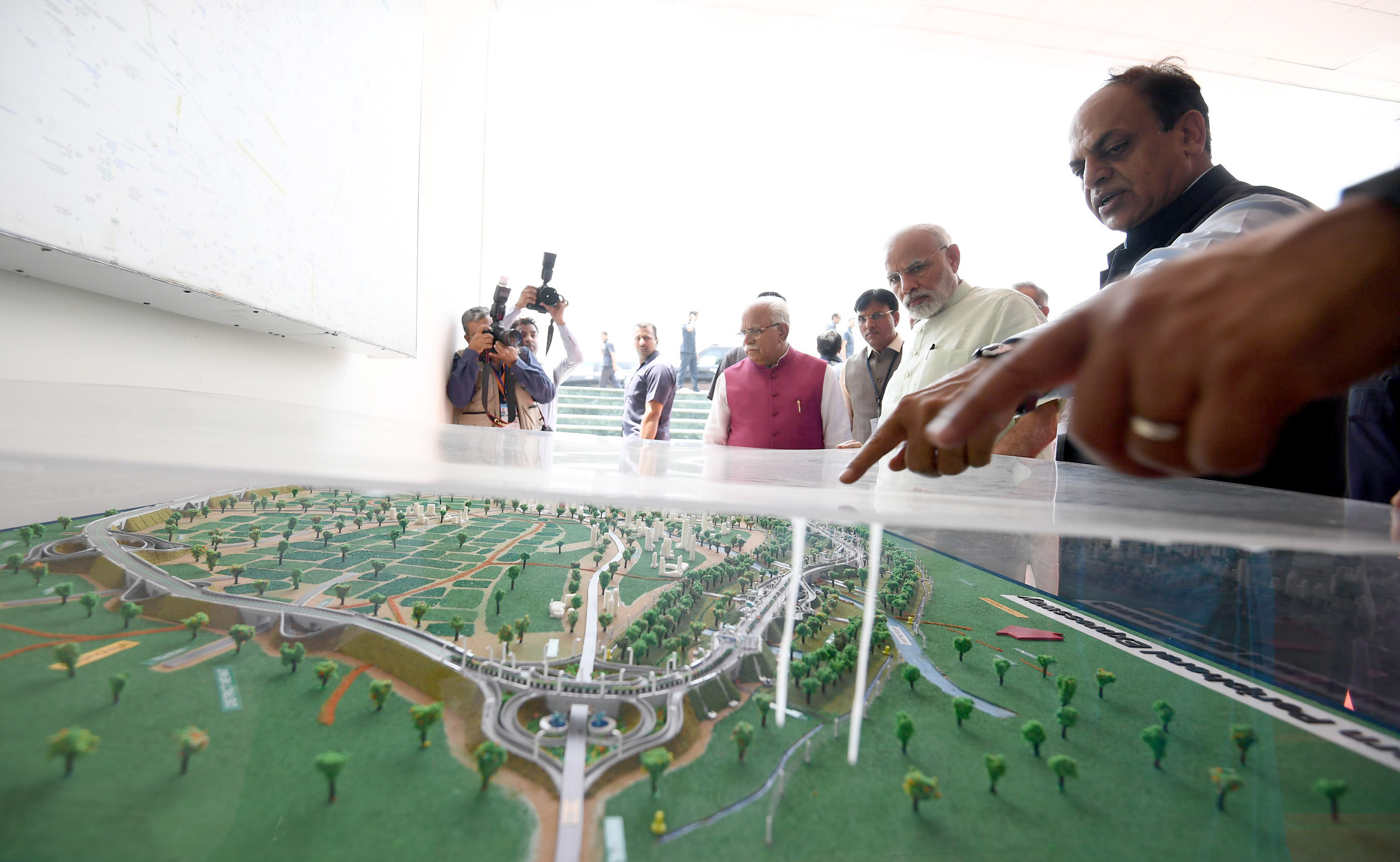
PM Narendra Modi inspecting the model during the inauguration of the Expressway.

- Sep 2015: Construction work of expressway divided by NHAI into 6 packages and awarded to 5 private firms.
- Nov 2015: Foundation stone of 135-km long expressway laid by PM of India Narendra Modi.
- Feb 2016: Construction work started on expressway.
- Apr 2017: An estimated 60% of the work has been completed. It is expected to be completed by August 2017.
- Jul 2017: Around 70% of the work has been completed. It is expected to be completed by March 2018, 3 months ahead of the deadline of July 2018 set by the Supreme Court of India.
- Oct 2017: Few farmers agitating against land acquisition in Greater Noida area and who forced stop the road construction work were arrested in Sep 2017 and police force are deployed to give cover to road workers so that work can proceed.
- Dec 2017: 85% work completed. Land acquisition related issue is there at two places in Greater Noida impacting length of about 1 kilometre each, which delayed the project completion.
- Apr 2018: The expressway was scheduled to be inaugurated by Indian Prime Minister Narendra Modi on 29 April 2018 but was cancelled due to elections in Karnataka.
- May 2018: The Supreme Court of India has directed the National Highways Authority of India (NHAI) to open the expressway before 31 May 2018.
- May 2018: KGP Expressway is inaugurated by PM Narendra Modi in Baghpat on 27 May 2018.

== See also ==
- Circular roads around Delhi: Ring, Regional and Zonal Highways
  - Inner Ring Road, Delhi
  - Outer Ring Road, Delhi
  - Urban Extension Road-II
  - Western Peripheral Expressway
- Expressways of India
  - Delhi–Meerut Expressway
  - Delhi–Amritsar–Katra Expressway
  - Yamuna Expressway
  - Najafgarh Drain Highway
- Other
  - Environmental issues in Delhi
  - Peripheral Ring Road
  - Satellite Town Ring Road
  - List of longest ring roads
  - List of highways in Haryana
