= IIT Flyover =

The IIT Flyover is the flyover from Sarvpriya Vihar to the IIT Delhi main gate in South Delhi, India. It is an important junction in Delhi's Outer Ring Road. The 620 route bus depot is located at one end of the flyover before the IIT Gate.

The Pansheel Flyover is close to the IIT Flyover.

The signal below the flyover is referred to as the IIT Signal and the road below the flyover is the Sri Aurobindo Marg.
