= Jaunti =

- Neighbourhood
- Location in Delhi, India
- Coordinates: 28°45′N 76°58′E
- Country: India
- State: Delhi
- District: North West Delhi
- Time zone: UTC+5:30 (IST)
- PIN: 110081
- Civic agency: North Delhi Municipal Corporation

Jaunti is a village situated in northwestern outer Delhi toward Haryana. It is in North west constituency of Delhi.

== Diaspora ==
People who hail from the village include:

Abhishek Chhikara - A notable lawyer in the United States.

== Connection ==
It is well connected via road to Delhi and adjoining state Haryana. The Public transport (beside private vehicles) is main medium of commuting. It has regular service by DTC buses.

== Facilities ==
The village has a veterinary hospital, medical dispensary, post office, bank (State bank of India), senior secondary school, boys primary school, girls primary school, stadium, park, temples, field for agriculture and two Panchayat houses.

== History ==
Jaunti has a medieval time fort and a very large pond (popularly called Talab). The fort was built during reign of Mughal emperor AKBAR, this village and its surrounding was densely forested with deer, antelope, and oxen. The site was hunting expedition for the Mughal king. There is a myth that the fort is connected to the pond via tunnels.

In 1964, M. S. Swaminathan organized a seed development project in the village to produce high-yielding varieties of seeds. The Jounti Seed Village helped to rapidly produce good quality seeds of high-yielding varieties of wheat, thereby hastening the onset of the wheat revolution in India.

== Model Village ==
Udit Raj MP tried to develop Jaunti as a model village. In July 2015, Raj had visited Melbourne, Australia. He had requested the Australian Indian community to help with construction of toilets in the Jaunti Village, which was part of his then electorate.

India Australia Exchange Forum (IAEF) - A Melbourne based Indian community organisation had taken lead in raising funds for construction of toilets in Jaunti village.
