= JJ Colony Madanpur Khadar =

JJ Colony
- District Subdivision
- Location in Delhi, India
- Coordinates: 28°31′48″N 77°18′49″E
- Country: India
- State: Delhi
- District: South East Delhi
- Established: 2000s

Languages
  - Official: Hindi, English, Punjabi,
- Time zone: UTC+5:30 (IST)
- Postal code: 110076
- Telephone code: 011

JJ Colony is a resettlement colony on the Gram Sabha Land of Madanpur Khadar Village in the south-eastern region of Delhi. It is located in close proximity to Sarita Vihar and Kalindi Kunj, about 1 kilometers from the Uttar Pradesh border. It was created in 2004 when the slum dwellers from across Delhi were forcefully evicted and relocated to the urban peripheries.

== History ==
"Khadar" refers to the black loamy soil found in this region; a natural feature caused by the low-lying areas of fertile floodplains. Since most of the land is on the slopes of canals running through the colony, local building regulations prohibit the construction of houses higher than three floors. For over 100 years, a village called Madanpur Khadar had existed in this area, until new waves of migrants in the 1970s and 1980s going to Delhi in search of jobs and working in the industries and factories in Delhi's urban peripheries began to change its landscape.

In 2000, a landmark judgment was passed by the Indian Supreme Court. During the summing up of a Public Interest Litigation brought by a ‘concerned citizen’, the judge labeled slum dwellers as ‘pickpockets’, ‘encroachers’ and ‘trespassers’. Widely known as the Almitra Patel case, this ruling overturned the earlier political patronage of slums that had enabled its residents to live and flourish in the city, even though the land they lived on was not formally owned by them. As Dr. Ayona Datta wrote in 2012, "While the Indian courts till the 1980s had followed an implicit understanding that access to affordable shelter and infrastructure services was a basic human right, this ruling set the trend for interpreting squatting as a criminal offense in most regional states of India". Shortly after, Madanpur Khadar area was assigned by the Government of India as a relocation site for evictees from various slums across Delhi.

The name JJ Colony is a derivative of "jhuggi-jhopri" a colloquial name for unauthorized slums. Madanpur Khadar JJ Colony was formed after the Supreme Court ruling in 2000 when the Delhi Development Authority (DDA) acquired land from the village of Madanpur Khadar, subdivided it into plots and sold it on a lease (Rs7000 for 22m^{2} plots and Rs 5000 for 12m^{2} plots) to thousands of families who were evicted and relocated from slums across Delhi. The eligibility for relocation was set as those slum dwellers holding ration cards by 31 January 1990. Later, it was modified to make those holding ration cards up to 31 December 1998 eligible to plots of 12.5m^{2}. Over four years, people from Nehru Place, Kalkaji Mandir, Raj Nagar, R. K. Puram, Nizamuddin, Green Park, Alaknanda, and ITO were relocated to the JJ colony under extremely challenging and difficult conditions. Although its residents are now legal leaseholders of their plots, it was named a JJ Colony since the inhabitants were previously slum dwellers from Delhi.

A report by Delhi Janwadi Adhikar Manch in 2001 highlighted the challenges that newly evicted slum dwellers faced when resettled in the Madanpur Khadar JJ Colony. The land was mainly agricultural and had not been developed or serviced with basic infrastructure connections. Although most residents moved to the Colony around 2000, they did not receive electricity connections till 2004. There was no direct sewage connection, resulting in many people defecating in the open. Despite the construction of public toilets later, they are poorly maintained and mostly unused. Other infrastructures, such as water and sanitation, were also lacking at the time of settlement. Water supply was unpredictable and residents often had to rely on tankers or hand pumps. Drainage was via uncovered channels along the internal roads.

== Accessibility ==
Different types of private transport operate out of the colony. E-rickshaws take people from here to the two nearest metro stations- Sarita Vihar on the Violet Line and Kalindi Kunj on the Magenta Line. Apart from this, private mini-buses and vans offer their services through Jasola-Okhla-Harkesh Nagar to Nehru Place and back. Despite being one of the biggest resettlement colonies, with hundreds of workers going outside to work, the Delhi Transport Corporation has no buses that run along these routes, making the residents entirely dependent on private transportation and, more recently, the Delhi Metro.

== Education and employment ==
There are 6 government schools in the JJ colony and about 15 private schools. Prior to the opening of these schools, the children from the resettlement colony attended the Sarita Vihar Government School.

Men of the colony are typically employed as daily wage workers, in hotels, or call centers. Women also work in these places, but typically also find employment in the flats/homes of Sarita Vihar and Kalindi Kunj as domestic laborers.

== Demographics ==
Current residents of Khadar are typically first or second generation migrants from regional states such as West Bengal, Uttar Pradesh, Bihar, or Rajasthan. The population is estimated around 25000 people, the majority of which are Hindus. Residents are primarily engaged in low-wage jobs such as unskilled laborers, drivers, domestic workers, security guards, rag pickers, vendors, and construction, industrial, and commercial workers. Women typically work as domestic workers, factory workers, taxi drivers, street hawkers, and NGO workers. Hindi is the local language.

JJ colony in khadar includes so many cultural aspects and religion communities.

Religion at JJ Colony, Madanpur Khadar
Hindu	89.9%
Muslim	8.7%
Christian	2.1%
Sikh	1.2%
Source: Census Report of 2011, Government Of India

== Governance ==
The ward number of the JJ colony is 103, and the current councillor is Santosh Devi, who won on a ticket from the ruling Bharatiya Janata Party (BJP.) in 2017.

== Physical and social infrastructure ==
The Urban Services Programme for resettlement colonies mandates that Pay and Use toilets be made available at the ratio of 1 seat per 10 families. However, the number of public toilets in the entire locality ranges from about 15–20. The number of public toilets in each block typically depends upon the size of the block. B1 has 5 toilets whereas A1 has 3 and B2 has 2. The toilets also only operate on specific times, from 6-11 a.m. and 4-8 p.m. Safe and free drinking water is difficult to find in this colony, as the supply water is non-potable and hard. This has led to a growing water-distilling business in the region which provide 20 liters for Rs. 10 on average.

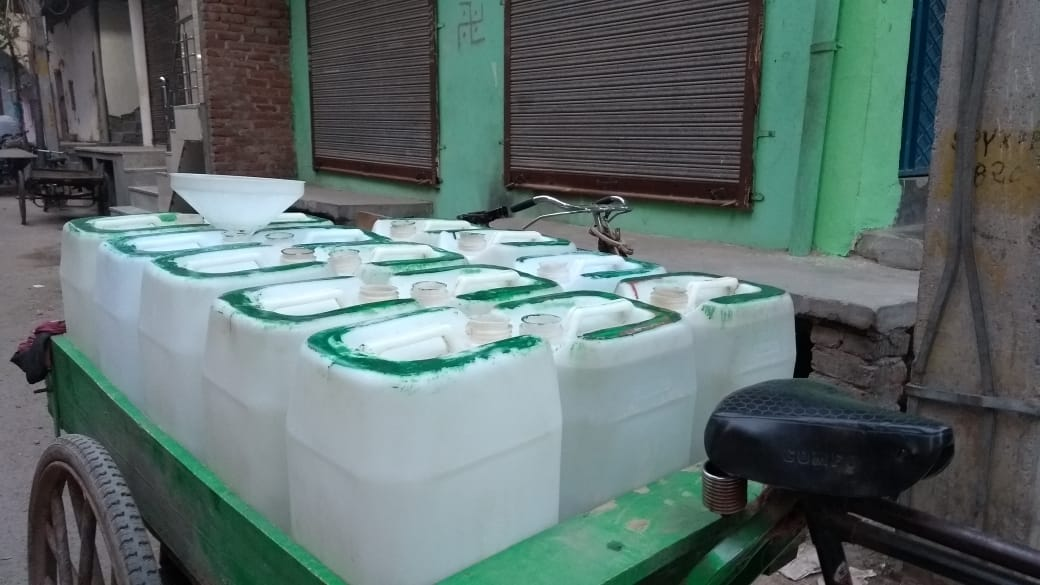
Private water distribution

The nearby Badarpur Thermal Power Station on Mathura Road creates long-term health risks of exposure to fly ash and dust particles. However, there are no primary health centers; only one government dispensary is functional in the area, though many private clinics also exist. Health remains a major area of concern, with diseases such as diarrhea, typhoid and respiratory diseases common among children. According to a study by Delhi Forces Neev, 2 percent of the children in Madanpur Khadar were severely malnourished as of 2010. For any major illnesses, residents have to travel more than 15 k m to AIIMS or Safdarjung Hospital.

The lack of access to basic civic amenities and essential services is a problem for all, but disproportionately affects women and young girls in such situations. As a Guardian article recently reported, "Faced with prohibitive costs of unregulated private transport, fear of harassment by men on long journeys and few employment opportunities in their new settlement, they have little choice but to remain at home". The challenges of mobility for women are further exacerbated by high incidences of gender-based violence, including sexual harassment, sexual assault and domestic violence. NGOs such as Jagori have worked in this settlement raising awareness about Violence Against Women (VAW) since 2004.

There are close to 40 anganwadis (crèches) in the JJ colony. While most of them are run by the government, some of them were sub-contracted to NGO's briefly. The further operational status of these remains undetermined.

There are many NGO's currently working in Madanpur Khadar, such as EFRAH India, World Vision India, Jagori, Agragrami India, Etasha Society, Prayatan, Casp Delhi. They work on issues such as health, education, women's empowerment, craft making, vocational training, and placements. Most of these organizations focus on women's and children's rights.
