= Munirka =

- Neighborhood of Delhi
- Location in Delhi, India
- Coordinates: 28.553212°N 77.174482°E
- Country: India
- State: Delhi
- District: South Delhi

Languages
  - Official: Hindi, English
- Time zone: UTC+5:30 (IST)
- PIN: 110067
- Lok Sabha constituency: New Delhi
- Civic agency: NDMC

Munirka is a neighborhood in South Delhi, located near Jawaharlal Nehru University and Indian Institute of Technology Delhi campuses.

Its neighborhood consists of the Jawaharlal Nehru University campus on the south, Vasant Vihar on the northwest, Rama Krishna Puram on the northern side and the Indian Institute of Technology Delhi campus and Ber Sarai on south-eastern front. The outer ring road forms part of the boundary.

The notification for the urbanisation of Munirka was issued in March 1954, making it one of the earliest villages to be urbanised.

== Historical sites ==
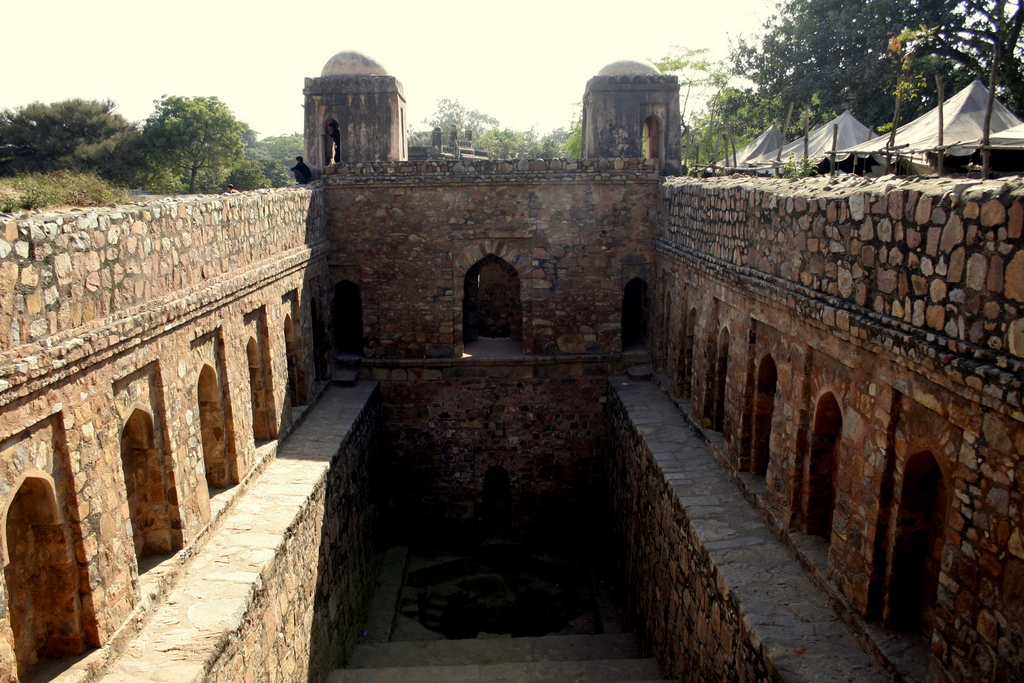
Boali Munirka, built in Lodhi dynasty period, 1451–1526 A.D.

== Notable people ==
- Khajan Singh, Indian swimmer
- Rajat Tokas, Indian television actor
