= National Highway 334C (India) =

National highway in India

National Highway 334C
- Map of National Highway 334C in red

Major junctions
- From: Bulandshahr
- To: Ghaziabad

Location
- Country: India
- States: Uttar Pradesh

Highway system
- Roads in India; Expressways; National; State; Asian
← NH 334B	→ NH 534

National Highway 334C (NH 334C) is a National Highway in India.
