= Sohna Elevated Corridor =

Indian highway connecting Gurgaon and Sohna in Haryana

Route information
- Maintained by National Highways Authority of India (NHAI)
- Length: 21.65 km (13.45 mi)
- Existed: 11 July 2022–present

Major junctions
- North end: Rajiv Chowk, Gurugram
- Delhi–Gurgaon Expressway
- South end: K.R. Mangalam University, Sohna; Delhi–Mumbai Expressway

Location
- Country: India
- States: Haryana
- Major cities: Gurugram and Sohna

Highway system
- Roads in India; Expressways; National; State; Asian

Sohna Elevated Corridor or Sohna Road is a 21.65 km (13.45 mi) long, access controlled, six-lane wide elevated expressways in Gurgaon of Haryana, India. The project has been completed by the National Highways Authority of India (NHAI) at an estimated cost of ₹1,466 crore. It was fully opened for public on 11 July 2022, and forms part of NH 248A.

== Construction ==
The NHAI has divided the construction work of this project into two packages.

Package	Length in km	Value in crores	Contractor
Rajiv Chowk in Gurugram to Badshahpur	08.94	₹800	Oriental Structural Engineers
Badshahpur to K.R. Mangalam University in Sohna	12.71	₹666	H.G. Infra Engineering

== 2020 Accident ==
A major mishap during project execution happened on 22 August 2020, when a section of the under-construction flyover came crashing down. The cause of this collapse was attributed to the caving in of three recently installed girders between two pillars. The accident spot is close to the Vipul Greens residential apartment complex on Sohna Road and is located in a high-traffic zone. However, owing to partial lock-down measures enforced by the Government of Haryana, many businesses and leisure outlets were closed at that time. This helped in avoiding fatalities and in keeping the casualty figure low. According to Gurgaon Police, two labourers suffered minor injuries and there were no injuries among pedestrians or people in passing vehicles.

== Status updates ==
- Jan 2021: Construction work of Package 1 is 32% complete and Package 2 is 70% complete.
- Sep 2021: The corridor is around 60% completed, and is expected to be fully completed and become operational by June 2022.
- April 2022: 12.7 km long Badshahpur to Sohna (Package-2) opened for traffic on 1 April by NHAI. Rajiv Chowk in Gurgaon to Badshahpur (Package-1) will be completed by June 2022.
- July 2022: Package-1 (Gurgaon to Badshahpur) opened to public by the NHAI on 11 July 2022. This marks the completion of the entire project. It was inaugurated by Road transport and Highways Minister Shri Nitin Gadkari.

== See also ==
- Delhi–Mumbai Expressway
- Delhi–Jaipur Expressway
- Delhi–Gurgaon Expressway
- Western Peripheral Expressway (KMP)
- Dwarka Expressway
