= Outer Ring Road, Delhi =

Road in Delhi, India

Outer Ring Road
- Delhi Outer Ring Road highlighted in Red
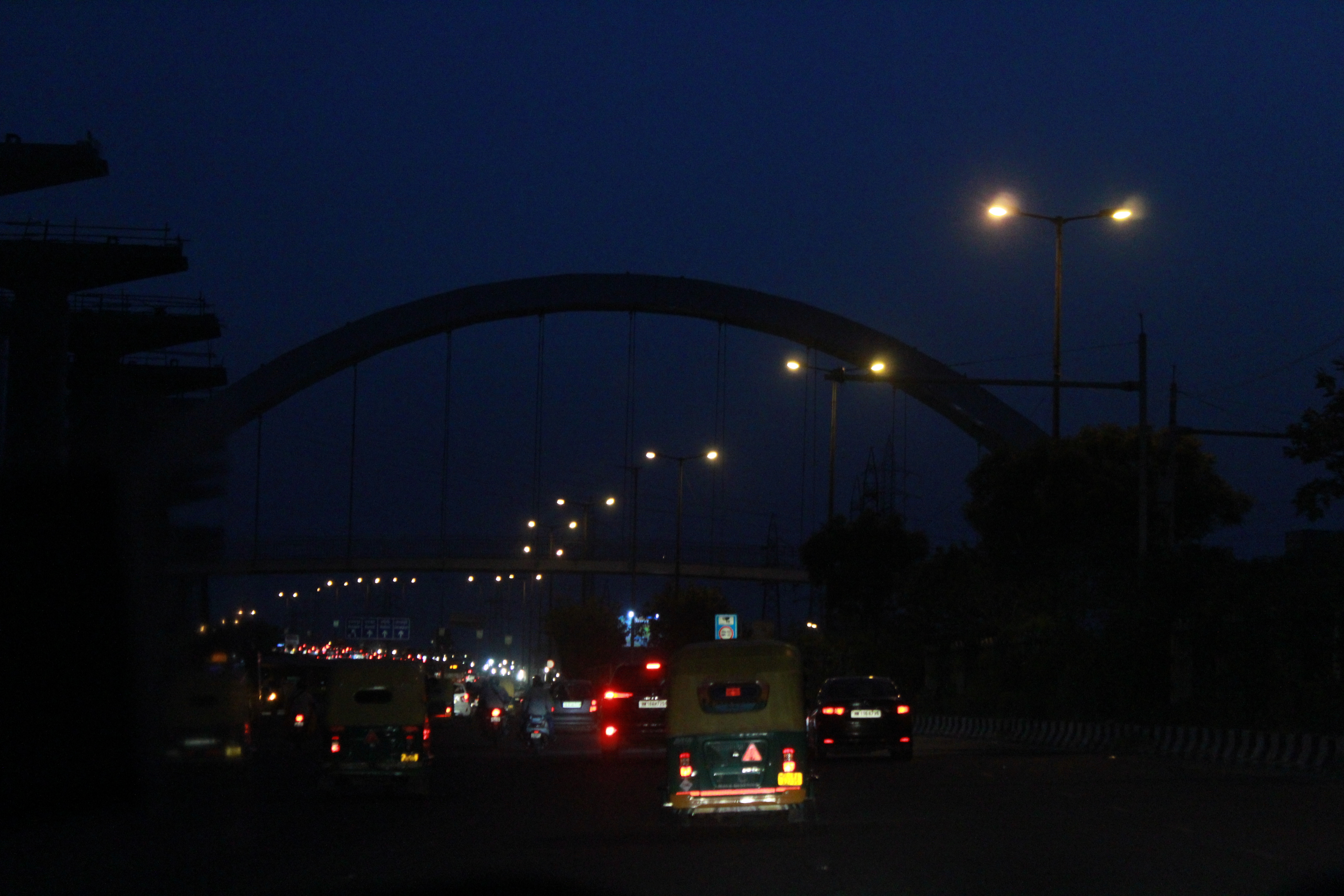

Route information
- Length: 47.537 km (29.538 mi)
- Existed: 1984–present

Location
- Country: India
- State: Delhi
- Major cities: New Delhi, North Delhi, North West Delhi, West Delhi, South West Delhi, South Delhi, South East Delhi, Central Delhi

Highway system
- Roads in India; Expressways; National; State; Asian; State Highways in Delhi

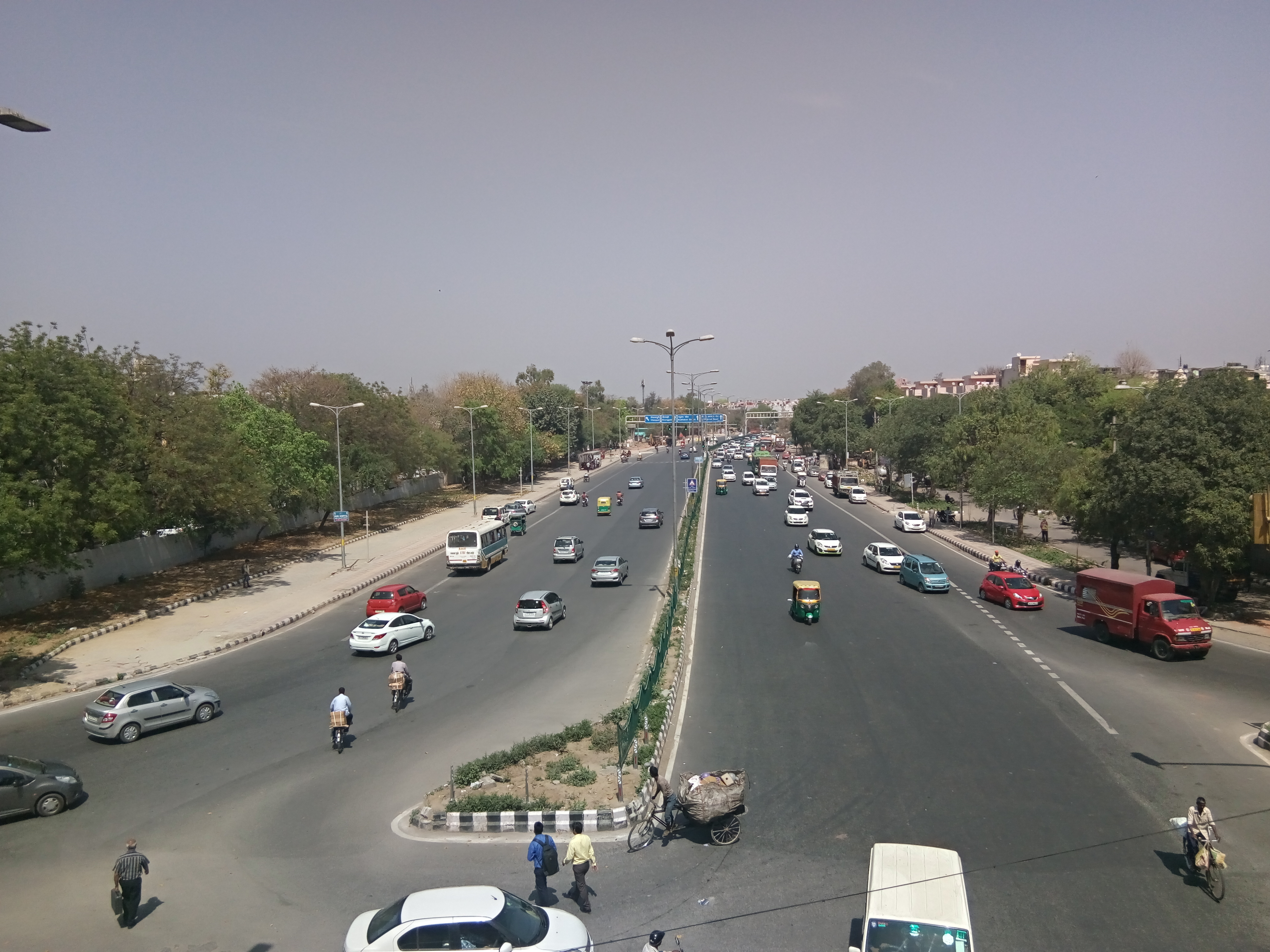
Outer Ring Road as seen from Janakpuri Flyover at District Center, Janakpuri

The Outer Ring Road officially known as Dr. KB Hedgewar Marg is a six-lane ring road that encircles the city of Delhi. It has three lanes in each direction, with a total length of 47 km. Although it used to have traffic lights and at-grade intersections, mushrooming interchanges have reduced the number of lights to just two, and traffic now flows much more smoothly. Several stretches of the Outer Ring Road have been notified as National Highways. Within Delhi state, Delhi Metro's Magenta Line largely runs along the Outer Ring Road.

Delhi features 3 ring roads, namely the inner, the outer, and the outermost UER-II.

== Areas on Outer Ring Road ==
List of places on Delhi Outer Ring road in anti-clockwise direction is as follows:

- Civil Lines
- Majnu Ka Tila / New Aruna Nagar
- Gopalpur Village
- Nirankari Park
- Burari Crossing
- Mukundupur
- Bhalswa Lake
- Mukarba Chowk
- Haiderpur, Shalimar Bagh
- Badli Village, Rohini
- Rohini
- Pitampura
- Mangolpuri
- Peeragarhi, Paschim Vihar
- Paschim Vihar
- Keshopur
- Vikaspuri
- Janakpuri
- Dabri
- Dashrathpuri
- Mahavir Enclave
- Palam
- Delhi Cantonment
- Vasant Vihar
- RK Puram
- Munirka
- IIT Delhi, Hauz Khas
- Hauz Khas
- Panchsheel Park
- Chirag Delhi
- Greater Kailash
- Kalkaji
- Nehru Place
- New Friends Colony
- Okhla
- Kalindi Kunj

== Junctions ==
Outer Ring Road features 14 junctions. In no particular order, they are:

- NH 8/Subruto Park,
- Vasant Kunj/Munirka/R.K. Puram,
- IIT Gate (flyover),
- Khel Gaon Marg (flyover), near Malviya Nagar and Panchsheel Colony
- Madan Gir/Chirag Delhi (flyover)/Andrews Ganj,
- Kalkaji/Nehru Place (flyover),
- Modi Mill (flyover),
- Okhla,
- ISBT (flyover),
- Majnu Ka Tilla,
- Majra Burari,
- Azad Pur/Jahingir Pur,
- Rohini,
- Peera Garhi,
- Sundar Vihar,
- Vikas Puri,
- Janakpuri (Pankha Road)
- Delhi Cantt (Cariappa Marg)

== Pedestrian Underpasses ==
Like the Ring Road, Delhi's Outer Ring Road features some semblance of grade separation between pedestrian and vehicular traffic. Pedestrian underpasses are present at the following points:

- Near Chirag Delhi Flyover (DTTDC)
- Near IIT Flyover (DTTDC)
- Dr. Hedgewar Marg at Saraswati Vihar
- Soaminagar
- Mangol Puri
- Paras Cinema Flyover, Nehru Place
- Munirka
- Sarvpriya Vihar
- Power House, Pitampura
- Rama Market, Pitampura

Additional pedestrian underpasses are to be constructed at the following points:

- Kalkaji Temple junction
- Panchsheel Colony

== Gallery ==
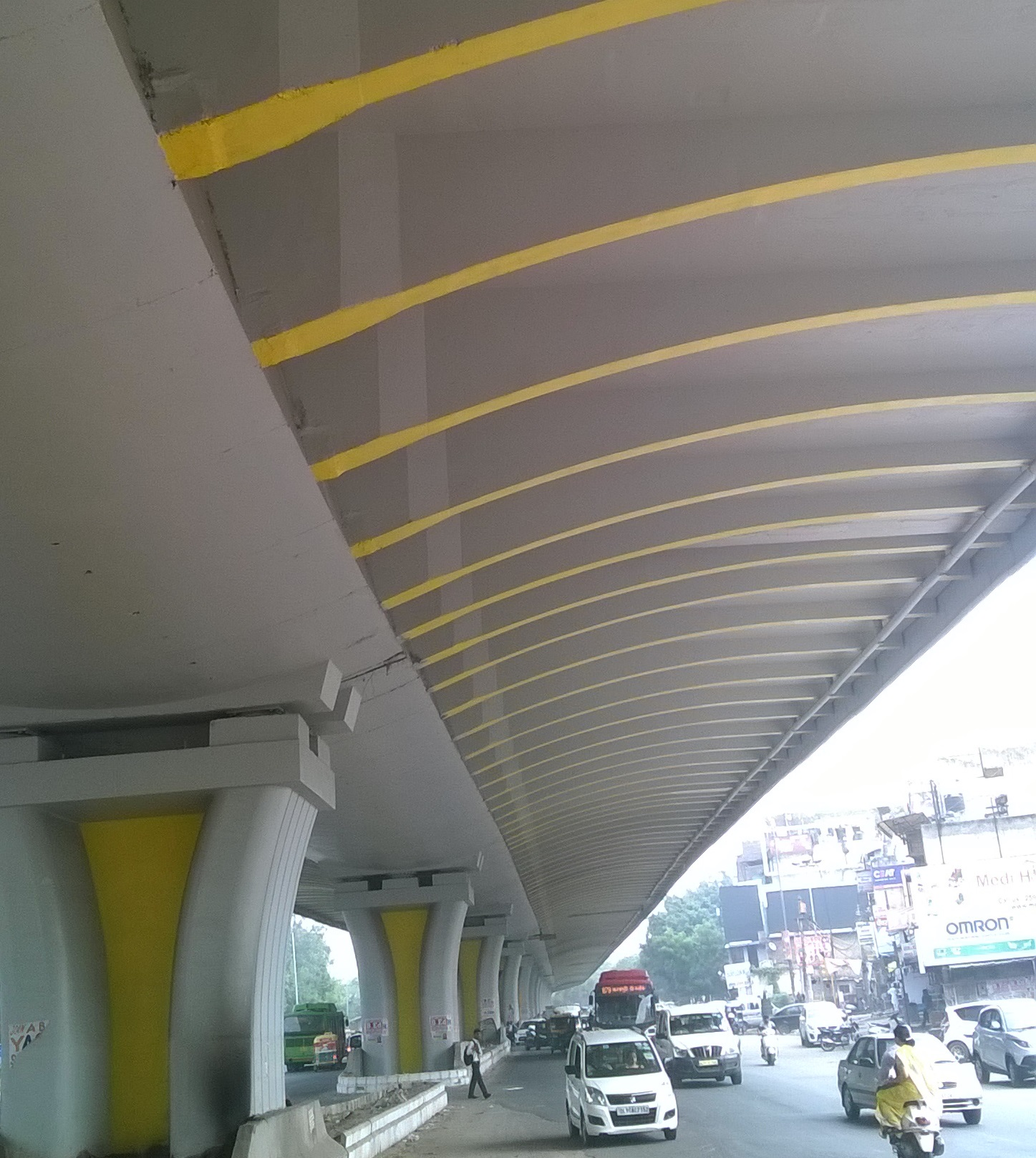
Elevated Corridor at Vikaspuri on Outer Ring Road, Delhi

== See also ==
- Circular roads around Delhi: Ring, Regional and Zonal Highways
  - Inner Ring Road, Delhi
  - Urban Extension Road-II
- List of expressways in India
  - Delhi–Amritsar–Katra Expressway
  - Delhi–Mumbai Expressway
  - Najafgarh Drain Highway
