= Loni, Ghaziabad =

Loni
- Town
- Location in Uttar Pradesh, India Loni (India)
- Coordinates: 28.75°N 77.28°E
- Country: India
- State: Uttar Pradesh
- District: Ghaziabad
- Administrative Division: Meerut division
- Elevation: 283 m (928 ft)

Population (2011)
  - Total: 516,082
  - Rank: 91st

Languages
  - Official: Hindi, English
- Time zone: UTC+5:30 (IST)
- PIN: 201102
- Sex ratio: 871 per 1000 Males ♂/♀
- Website: www.npploni.in

Loni is a city near Ghaziabad in Ghaziabad district in the state of Uttar Pradesh, India. Loni is governed by Loni Municipal Council which reports to the Ghaziabad Metropolitan Region. It is noted for having consistently recorded some of the world's highest level of air pollution, ranking as the world's most polluted city in 2025.

== Name ==
The name Lonī is from the Hindi word lon, meaning "salt", which ultimately comes from Sanskrit lavaṇa. The name probably refers to the town's location in the middle of an area with abundant salt.

== History ==
Loni is listed in the Ain-i-Akbari, a Mughal period document, as a pargana under the Delhi sarkar subdivision, producing a revenue of 3,278,878 dams for the imperial treasury and supplying a force of 200 infantry and 20 cavalry. It had a brick fort at the time.

In the 14th century, an invasion by Timur took place in the town and fort of Loni a few days before the battle against Delhi's Tughlaq Sultan Mahmud Shah. One of Timur's emirs expressed the fear that the men, women and children they were dragging with them would break free and attack from the rear while the army was occupied in battle. Timur's solution was to have a hundred thousand adult Hindu males slaughtered before the battle. He insisted that individual owners would put their own slaves to death rather than outsource the task. Anybody failing to kill would be killed himself.

== Geography ==
Loni is located at 28.75°N 77.28°E. It has an average elevation of 283 metres (928 ft). Its area is 34.68 square kilometres (13.39 sq mi).

According to the World Air Quality Report 2024, Loni is one of the world's 20 most polluted city in India (see the section about air pollution below).

Loni is located in the Upper Ganga-Yamuna Doab, a fertile alluvial plain between the Ganga and Yamuna rivers.

== Administration ==
=== Loni Tehsil ===
Loni became a new tehsil in Ghaziabad district in 2015, within Meerut division, with its headquarters at Rampark, about 27 km west of the district headquarters. The tehsil contains about 49 villages. The order to this effect was issued by the principal secretary of revenue, Kishan Singh Atoria.

=== Municipal finance ===
According to financial data published on the CityFinance Portal of the Ministry of Housing and Urban Affairs, the Loni Nagar Palika Parishad reported total revenue receipts of ₹47 crore (US$5.6 million) and total expenditure of ₹77 crore (US$9.2 million) in 2022–23. Tax revenue accounted for about 8.5% of the total revenue, while the municipality received ₹38 crore in grants during the financial year.

=== Loni Nagar Palika Parisad ===
The Loni Nagar Palika Parisad was first established on 31 March 1971 as a Nagar Panchayat. Its office is located in Khanna Nagar. According to 2011 census, its population is 516,082. Loni Nagar Palika Parisad is divided into 55 wards. It has total of 36 employees.

=== Lok Sabha constituency ===
Loni is within the Ghaziabad constituency, whose MP is Atul Garg, BJP.

=== Loni Assembly constituency ===
As per notification No. 282/UP/2006, Loni became a separate assembly constituency, whose MLA is Nand Kishor Gurjar, BJP.

The Loni assembly constituency includes the following Patwari Circles (PCs):

- 1-Agraula
- 2-Lutfullapur Nawada
- 3-Badshahpur Sirauli
- 4-Aurangabad Ristal
- 5-Behta Hajipur
- 6-Pachaira
- 7-Chirori
- 8- Pavi Sadakpur (Pabhi Sadakpur)
- 9-Meerpur Hindu
- 10-Asalatpur (Farookh Nagar)
- 11-Sirora Salempur
- 12-Loni Border
- 13-Banthla
- 14-sikhrani
- 15-Mandaula
- 16-Khanpur khadar
- 17-Nistauli
- 18-Sharfuddinpur Jawali
- 19-Teela (of 2-Loni Kanungo Circle (KC) and Loni NP of 2-Ghaziabad tehsil)
- 20-Illachipur
- 21-Nanu Nauraspur
- 22-Milak
- 23-Shakalpura
- 24-Ristal
- 25-Gannauli
- 26-Siroli
- 27-Afjalpur
- 28-Nistoli
- 29-Jassai Gadhi, Kaitya Gadhi
- 30-Siti
- 31-Badarpur

== Demographics ==
Religions in Loni (2011)
Religion	Percent
Hinduism	61.95%
Islam	36.88%
Jainism	0.46%
Other or not stated	0.71%

As of the 2011 India census, Loni had a population of 516,082. Males constitute 275,025 (52.8%) of the population and females 241,057 (47.2%). The total number of households in Loni is 89,634. Loni has an average literacy rate of 75.24%, higher than the national average of 74.04%. Male literacy is 83.14%, and female literacy is 66.15%. In Loni, around 15% of the population is under six years of age.

Languages in Loni (2011)
1. Hindi (96.7%)
2. Urdu (2.51%)
3. Others (0.81%)

Hindi is the predominant language in the city. Urdu is also spoken there.

== Connectivity and transport ==
Loni can be reached by road, rail, and air. By road, Loni is well-connected to Delhi, NOIDA, Hapur, Modinagar, Bulandshahr, Meerut, Saharanpur, Haridwar, etc. Many people commute to Delhi, NOIDA, and Greater Noida every day for work. The nearest airport is Hindon Airport, which is located in Ghaziabad.

=== Road ===
Loni has a moderate road network connecting to the Delhi-Saharanpur route, with bus service provided by Uttar Pradesh State Road Transport Corporation (UPSRTC) buses. The bus stand of the UPSRTC is located near Loni crossing (Delhi). The Delhi Transport Corporation (DTC) also provided similar bus service but currently such service is not available in Loni. Indira Puri was the location of the DTC bus terminal for Delhi buses, where DTC routes 2 and 263 used to be available. Loni is 12 kilometres (7.5 mi) from the Inter State Bus Terminals (ISBT) of Kashmiri Gate and Anand Vihar, and 18 kilometres (11 mi) from Ghaziabad. A new bus terminal for private bus operators is near the Advanced Learning Telecom (ALT) training center, Raj Nagar, which is called the ALT Bus Stand. The most common system of transportation is shared autos, which run between Shahdara metro station, Pavi Pusta, Pavi, Tronica City, Loni, Tiraha, and Indrapuri. Two bus routes go to the Uttar Pradesh (UP) Border, and to the Shahdara and Seelampur metro stations. Loni Depot is a UP bus terminal for UPSRTC Buses, where buses are available to Shamli, Baraut, Baghpat, Saharanpur, Gramin Sewa Rampark Ext., Khajuri Chowk, by Pavi Pusta Road, and Pavi Pusta Chowk to Khajuri.

=== Rail ===
Loni is also connected via railway. Its main stations are the Noli Railway Station (NOLI), Behta Hazipur Halt (BHHZ), Nursratabad Kharkhari (NTG), and Gotra Halt (GTRA). NOLI, which is within the Northern Railway zone of Indian Railways, is close to old Delhi and Ghaziabad railway stations, and connects Loni to Delhi through Shahdara on the Shamli Saharanpur route. NOLI handles over 26 trains and serves about 12,000 passengers every day. There are four intercity trains that start from or pass through NOLI. A warehouse of the Food Corporation of India (FCI) at the station is now used as a container depot.

==== Delhi Metro ====
Loni is now connected with Metro services through the Pink Line. The DMRC has a station within Loni, at Shiv Vihar, which is on a 3 kilometres (1.9 mi) extension of the Yamuna Vihar line to Shiv Vihar, in the third phase of expansion of the Metro network under the Pink Line with Metro feeder bus service. The Shiv Vihar station is serving large part of Loni which was previously dependent on shared auto. Shiv Vihar station caters to a large number of commuters from Loni, with its population of at least 500,000 people. It is also close to Delhi, just 8 kilometres (5.0 mi) from the Shahdara and Seelampur Metro stations.

=== Air ===
Loni is 11 kilometres (6.8 mi) from Hindon Airport, which is located in Ghaziabad, India.

Loni is 35 kilometres (22 mi) from Indira Gandhi International Airport, located at Palam, which is the primary international airport of the National Capital Region of Delhi. With the commencement of operations at the new Terminal 3, Indira Gandhi International Airport has become India's and South Asia's largest aviation hub, with a current capacity of more than 46 million passengers a year.

== Loni Gas Pipeline ==
In 2001, GAIL commissioned the world's longest, and India's first, cross-country LPG transmission pipeline, from Jamnagar to Loni. GAIL's LPG transmission business includes the 1927-km LPG pipeline network that connects the western, northern and southern parts of India. This includes the world's longest exclusively LPG pipeline from Jamnagar, Gujarat, to Teela Loni, near Delhi (another 70 km having been added to this system between Kandla and Samakhiali in Gujarat, to facilitate the transportation of LPG imported at Kandla port). GAIL's LPG pipelines can transport 3.8 million tonnes per year of LPG, and have the capacity to supply more than 20% of the LPG consumed in the country. There are huge gas distribution terminals in Loni. IOCL, BPCL and HPCL are supplying cooking gas from there to north India.

== Air Pollution ==
Loni has consistently recorded some of the highest levels of air pollution globally. In the 2025 World Air Quality Report released by the Swiss organization IQAir in March 2026, Loni was ranked as the most polluted city in the world. The report noted an annual average PM_{2.5} concentration of 112.5 μg/m^{3}, which is more than 22 times the World Health Organization (WHO) annual air quality guideline. This represented a nearly 23% increase in pollution levels compared to 2024 data.The city's air quality is severely impacted by its location within the National Capital Region (NCR), where a combination of rapid urbanization, industrial emissions (brick kilns, metal processing units, and unauthorised industrial units), and vehicular traffic (heavy flow of diesel trucks using Loni as a transit corridor between Delhi and western UP) contribute to chronic smog. During the winter months (October to February), the situation often reaches "severe" levels on the Indian Air Quality Index (AQI) due to temperature inversion and seasonal crop residue burning in neighboring states. According to the Centre for Research on Energy and Clean Air (CREA), the broader Ghaziabad district, including Loni, frequently tops the list of India's most polluted urban clusters. Nearby Delhi and Ghaziabad are also among the ten most polluted cities in the world.

== See also ==
- Baghpat
- Rajkumar Baisla (Wrestler)
- Mahendra Fauji Baisla
- Greater Noida
- Hindon River
- Yamuna
- JagMohan Institute of Management and Technology
- Chirori Village
