= List of expressways in Maharashtra =

This is a list of expressways in Maharashtra.

== State expressways ==
State expressways are funded by the Government of Maharashtra and Government of India to connect areas within the state. These expressways reduce travel time, allowing for more efficient travel and fuel savings. This also allows for a more equal distribution of goods, especially to rural areas. These expressways are not part of the national expressway system, but may be operated by the state authority or national authority.

Number	Name	States	Southern or western terminus	Northern or eastern terminus	Length (km/mi)	Lanes	Year of Completion	Remarks
ME-2	Mumbai–Nagpur Expressway	Maharashtra	Amane, Bhiwandi	Nagpur	701 km (436 mi)	6	June 2025	Longest expressway in India
ME-1	Mumbai–Pune Expressway	Maharashtra	Mumbai	Pune	94.5 km (58.7 mi)	6	April 2002	India's first 6-lane expressway
	Mumbai Trans Harbour Link	Maharashtra	Sewri, South Mumbai	Chirle, Uran taluka, Navi Mumbai	21.8 km (13.5 mi)	6	December 2023	Longest sea bridge in India

== Bypass expressways ==
Bypass expressways were built to bypass city traffic and congestion. These may include ring roads, bypasses, freeways, and elevated roads that exist entirely within a city or between two cities. These expressways direct heavy traffic to the outskirts freeing city roads of traffic. This also allows outside traffic to directly pass the city instead of going through it further limiting traffic within a city.

Name	Locale	States	Length (km/mi)	Lanes	Year of Completion	Remarks
Eastern Freeway	Mumbai	Maharashtra	16.8 km (10.4 mi)	4	June 2014	
JNPT Road	Panvel, Navi Mumbai	Maharashtra	28 km (17 mi)	6	April 2022	6-lane access-controlled road connecting Navi Mumbai to JNPT Port, it runs parallel to Uran-Panvel road
Chatrapati Shivaji Maharaj Uddanpul (Nashik Freeway)	Nashik	Maharashtra	16 km (9.9 mi)	4-6	June 2013	First NHAI expressway in Maharashtra. The longest flyover in Maharashtra.

== Expressways under construction ==
Name	States	Length (km/mi)	Expected date of completion
Airoli–Katai Naka Freeway (Phase 1- 5.2 km section)	Maharashtra	12.3 km (7.6 mi)	2023-03
Coastal Road (Mumbai) (Phase 1)	Maharashtra	29.2 km (18.1 mi)	2023-12
Delhi–Mumbai Expressway	Delhi, Haryana, Rajasthan, Madhya Pradesh, Gujarat, Maharashtra	1,350 km (840 mi)	2028-12
Mumbai-Pune Expressway's Missing Link	Maharashtra	13.30 km (8.26 mi)	2025-01

== Proposed expressways ==
Name	States	Length (km/mi)
Bangalore–Pune Expressway	Karnataka, Maharashtra	700 km (430 mi)
Bhandara–Gadchiroli Expressway	Maharashtra	156 km (97 mi)
Nasik–Chennai Expressway	Maharashtra, Telangana, Karnataka, Andhra Pradesh, Tamil Nadu	900 km (560 mi)
Virar–Alibag Expressway	Maharashtra	126 km (78 mi)
Nasik-Pune Industrial Expressway	Maharashtra	250 km (160 mi)
Pune–Aurangabad Expressway	Maharashtra	225 km (140 mi)
Nagpur–Goa Expressway	Maharashtra	760 km (470 mi)
Hyderabad–Indore Expressway	Madhya Pradesh, Maharashtra, Telangana	713 km (443 mi)
Raipur–Hyderabad Expressway	Chhattisgarh, Maharashtra, Telangana	530 km (330 mi)
Jalna–Nanded Expressway	Maharashtra	179 km (111 mi)
Konkan Greenfield Expressway	Maharashtra	500 km (310 mi)
Nagpur-Bhandara-Gondia Expressway	Maharashtra	225 km (140 mi)
Nagpur–Hyderabad–Bengaluru Expressway	Maharashtra, Telangana, Andhra Pradesh, Karnataka	1,100 km (680 mi)
Nagpur–Vijayawada Expressway	Maharashtra, Telangana, Andhra Pradesh	457 km (284 mi)
