= Shaktipeeth Expressway =

Indian expressway connecting Nagpur and Goa

Route information
- Maintained by MSRDC
- Length: 856 km (532 mi)
- History: Opening 2028/29 (expected)

Major junctions
- North end: Pavnar, Wardha district, Maharashtra
- South end: Patradevi, North Goa district, Goa

Location
- Country: India
- States: Maharashtra,Goa
- Major cities: Nagpur, Wardha, Yavatmal, Hingoli, Nanded, Parbhani, Latur, Beed, Dharashiv, Barshi, Solapur, Pandharpur, Sangli, Kolhapur, Sindhudurg and Patradevi

Highway system
- Roads in India; Expressways; National; State; Asian

The Shaktipeeth Expressway, is a planned and approved 856 km (532 mi) long, six-lane access-controlled expressway, which will connect the city Nagpur in Maharashtra state, with the state of Goa. Passing through 13 districts of Maharashtra and one district of Goa, it will reduce both travel time and distance by 18–20 hours to only 7–8 hours, and from 1,110 to 852 kilometres (690 to 529 mi).

== Etymology ==
It is named the Shaktipeeth Expressway, as it will pass through three Shakta pithas. They are Mahalakshmi, Tuljabhavani, and Patradevi, along with two of the 12 Jyotirlingas at Aundha Nagnath and Parli Vaijnath, ambajogai ki yogeshwari devi as well as temples dedicated to Renuka in Mahur, Tuljabhavani in Tuljapur, along with the revered Vithoba Temple of Pandharpur and Dattatreya Sampradaya shrines at Audumbar and Narsobawadi.

== History ==
=== Conception ===
To improve Maharashtra's connectivity, tourism, development and economic growth, the Government of Maharashtra planned to build a new expressway from Nagpur to Goa. The expressway is expected to cut travel time from 18 to 20 hours to 7–8 hours. The expressway will pass through the regions of Vidarbha, Marathwada and Western Maharashtra. Once completed, these regions will see exponential growth with the growth of industries and socio-economic development by promoting employment among people living in the regions, which the regions currently lack altogether. The plan was launched by the current Chief Minister of Maharashtra, and the then Deputy Chief Minister of Maharashtra, Devendra Fadnavis, to the Cabinet of Maharashtra, in September 2022, and stated that it would be built at a cost of ₹ 75,000 crore. In March 2023, the project was approved by the Government of Maharashtra, and, though did not give any specific deadline for the completion of the expressway, but announced that it would be built at a cost of ₹ 83,600 crore, and will be opened to the traffic by 2028/29.

=== Construction ===
Tenders were launched for the project's construction in October 2022 by the Maharashtra State Road Development Corporation (MSRDC) in EPC mode, with the work expected to take five to seven years to complete.

== Details ==
=== Cost ===
It will be built at a cost of ₹96,000 crore (US$10 billion), which was earlier slated at ₹75,000 crore (US$7.9 billion). Operated and maintained by the Maharashtra State Road Development Corporation (MSRDC), it will be the longest expressway in Maharashtra.

=== Benefits ===
The expressway will greatly benefit the regions of Vidarbha, Marathwada, Konkan region and North Goa by many ways to facilitate socio-economic development, as described in the following:

- Trade: The expressway will benefit not only the regions through which it will pass, but also to Central India, by a creating a direct link, as it will help to boost exports as well as imports from the mineral ores and industrial products, as it is abundant in the states of western Madhya Pradesh and Chhattisgarh as a whole, via the Mormugao Port in Goa to and from West Asia, Europe and Africa. It will help to promote industrial activities in central Maharashtra, and will also be benefitted like the same.
- Tourism: The expressway will help to promote tourism, especially in the Western Ghats and northern Goa, and promote Hindu pilgrimage tourism in Vidarbha and Marathwada, due to the presence of a high level of religious sites in the two regions.
- Connectivity: Once operational, the expressway will become a direct route from Central India to Goa, by allowing faster, better and safer commute by avoiding congested routes, such as via Mumbai and Pune at present. It will reduce both travel time and distance considerably, from 18 to 20 hours at present to only 7–8 hours, and from approx. 1,110 km to only 760 km.
- Protection of the environment: The Government of Maharashtra has agreed to build the expressway as a 'Green Corridor' project. In view of this, thousands of plants, including trees and shrubs, are planted along and between the expressway.
- Employment: Due to increase in industrial activities along the expressway's route, various agricultural and industrial initiatives to help the state's economy and growth. The establishment of these numerous centres will result in multiple job possibilities for thousands of people living in both the states.

== Route ==
=== Maharashtra ===
The expressway will start from Pavnar in Wardha district, from where it will be linked with the Mumbai–Nagpur Expressway to link Nagpur, due to Pavnar's close proximity to that expressway, and will cover the following districts along with their cities:

- Wardha district
- Yavatmal district
- Hingoli district
- Parbhani district
- Nanded district
- Latur district
- Beed district
- Dharashiv district
- Solapur district
- Sangli district
- Kolhapur district
- Sindhudurg district

=== Goa ===
The expressway will terminate at the following city and district:

- Patradevi, North Goa district

== Inter-connectivity ==
- Mumbai–Nagpur Expressway: Nagpur–Goa Expressway will begin from the Mumbai–Nagpur Expressway near Wardha.
- Surat–Chennai Expressway: Nagpur–Goa Expressway will intersect the Surat–Chennai Expresswayin Latur district.
- NH-66 Mumbai-Goa: Nagpur–Goa Expressway will terminate near Goa at NH-66.

== Present status ==
- 2025 Jun: Nagpur-Goa Expressway get Maharashtra Cabinet approval with ₹20,787 crore project cost.
- 2025 Nov: 70% alignment has been finalised, for the remaining 30% measurement on two alternate routes is being carried out.
- 2026 Feb: Route alignment revised from 802 km to 856 km, and Maharashtra government approved a proposal to obtain Rs 20,000 crore loan for the acquisition of nearly 7,500 hectares of land for this project.

== See also ==
- List of expressways in Maharashtra
- Expressways in India
