= Expressways of India =

- Expressway signs for NE1 and NE2

System information
- Length: 7,992 km (4,966 mi)
- Formed: 2002

Highway names
- Expressways: National expressways (NE) (primary corridors); Economic corridors (EC) (industrial corridors); State expressways (SE) (regional corridors)

System links
- Roads in India; Expressways; National; State; Asian

The expressways of India are access-controlled toll highways featuring divided carriageways, engineered to support high-speed vehicular movement and to accommodate heavy loads. They constitute the highest class of road infrastructure in the Indian road network. As of April 2026, the total length of expressways in India was 7,332 km (4,556 mi), with 11,127.69 km (6,914.43 mi) under construction.

A central reservation or median separates the traffic moving in opposite directions on expressways. Entry and exits are permitted only through grade separated interchanges. In contrast, National highways may or may not have a median and may lack full access-control. Additionally, some highways constructed by State Governments, which may be fully or partially access-controlled, are designated or named as expressways by the respective State authorities.

Fully opened in April 2002, Mumbai–Pune Expressway was India's first six-lane, access-controlled, inter-city tolled expressway. Spanning 94.5 km (58.7 mi) between Mumbai and Pune, within the state of Maharashtra, it set the benchmark for future expressway development in the country. Since then, expressway construction has significantly accelerated, particularly under the Bharatmala project and other infrastructure programmes both national and regional.

As of 2024, the longest expressway in India is the partially-opened Delhi–Mumbai Expressway (Phase-3), spanning 1,015 km (631 mi), which was inaugurated on 18 December 2024. The widest expressway is the Delhi–Gurgaon section of the Dwarka Expressway, featuring 16 lanes, which was also opened in 2024.

== History ==
=== Pre-independence ===
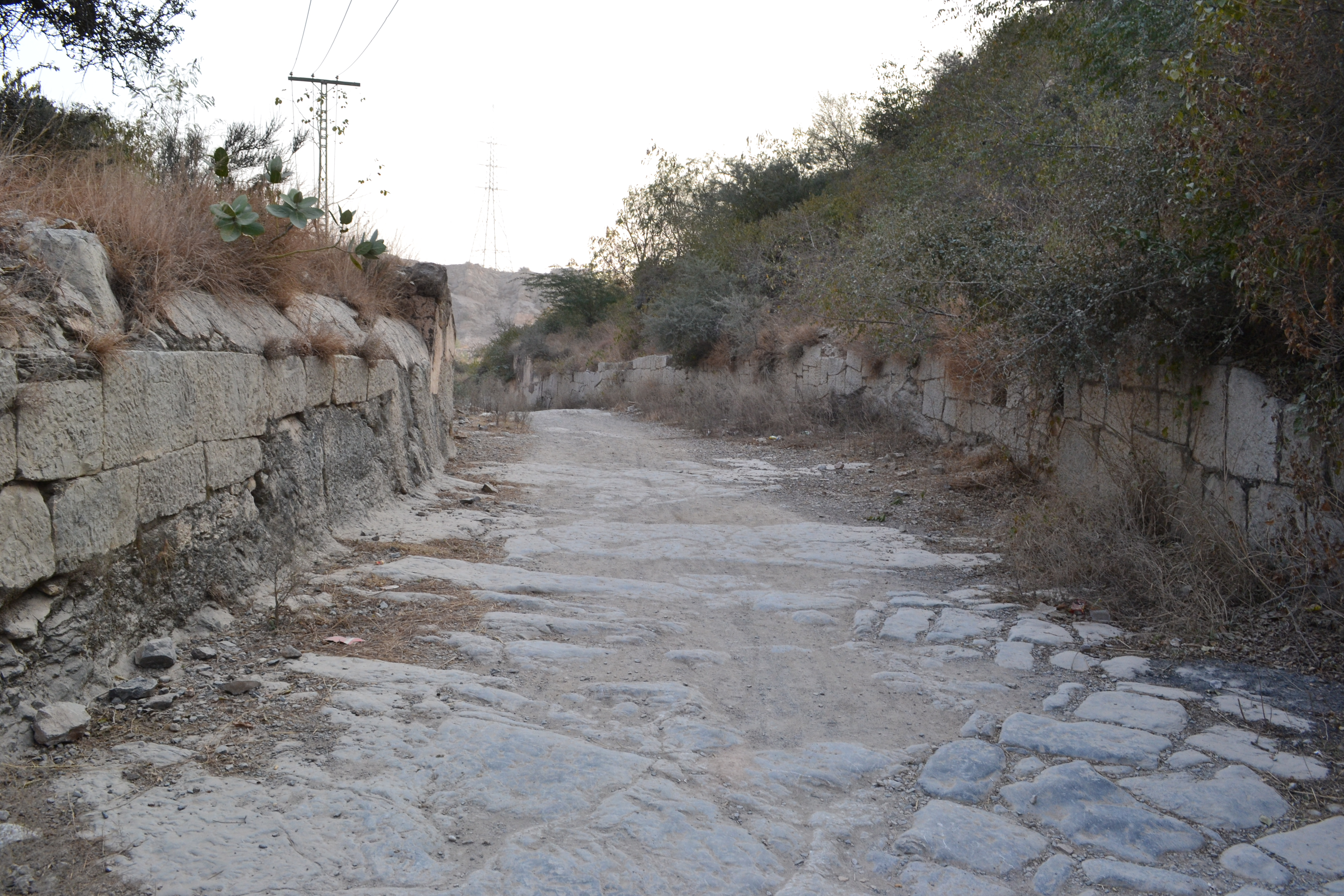
Preserved segment of the Grand Trunk Road between Margalla and Kala Chitta in modern-day Pakistan

While major roads in the Indian subcontinent existed as early as the 29th century BCE in the Indus Valley, the 3,655 km (2,271 mi) long Grand Trunk Road built by the Mauryans during 4th century BCE and later maintained by others, is one of the earliest examples of highest class road infrastructure in India. In 1934, Indian Roads Congress (IRC) was formed to overlook development and research of roads in India and envisioned to achieve a road density of 16 km per 100 km^{2} of land pre-independence. IRC would later go on to standardise access-controlled Expressway designs for India with its IRC:SP:99-2013 standard. It was not until in 1995 when National Highways Authority of India (NHAI) was established as an autonomous body to develop, maintain and manage India's road network through National Highways. NHAI would later build and operate various expressways in the country.

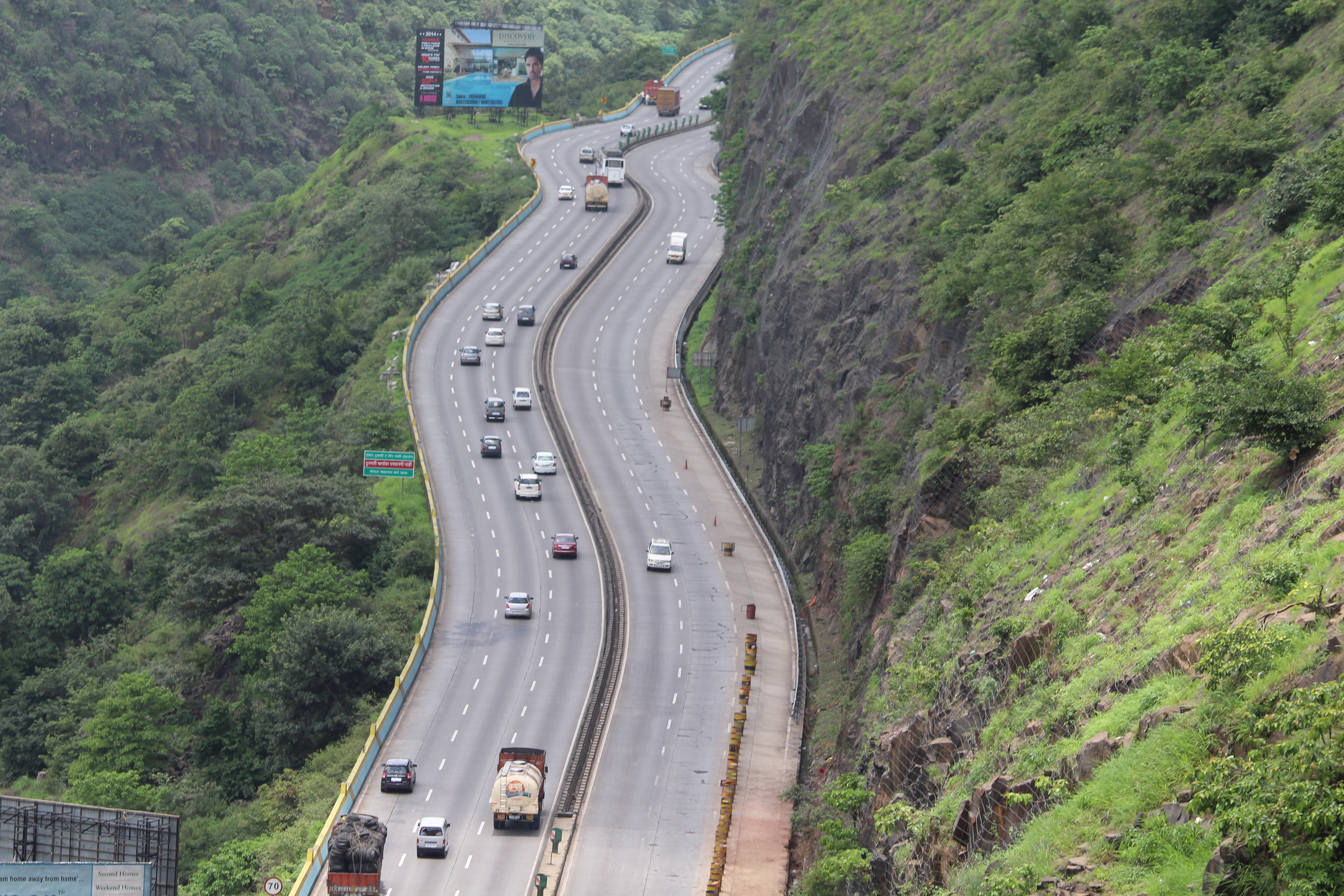
Mumbai–Pune Expressway, India's first six-lane expressway

In 1990, Government of Maharashtra appointed RITES to conduct a feasibility study for toll-based expressway between Mumbai and Pune, marking it as the first such initiative to construct an expressway in India. Four years later, RITES submitted its report and the project was estimated to cost ₹1,146 crore (equivalent to ₹82 billion or US$880 million in 2026). In March 1997, Maharashtra State Road Development Corporation (MSRDC) undertook the construction of the expressway on a Build–operate–transfer (BOT) model that allowed the state government to collect tolls for 30 years. At the end of the same year, after all environmental and forest clearances, the construction on the 94.5 km (58.7 mi) corridor commenced with first sections opening in 2000. In April 2002, India's first expressway was flagged to be fully operational, with an estimated construction cost of ₹1,630 crore (equivalent to ₹68 billion or US$730 million in 2026), which paved the way for more such expressways across the country.

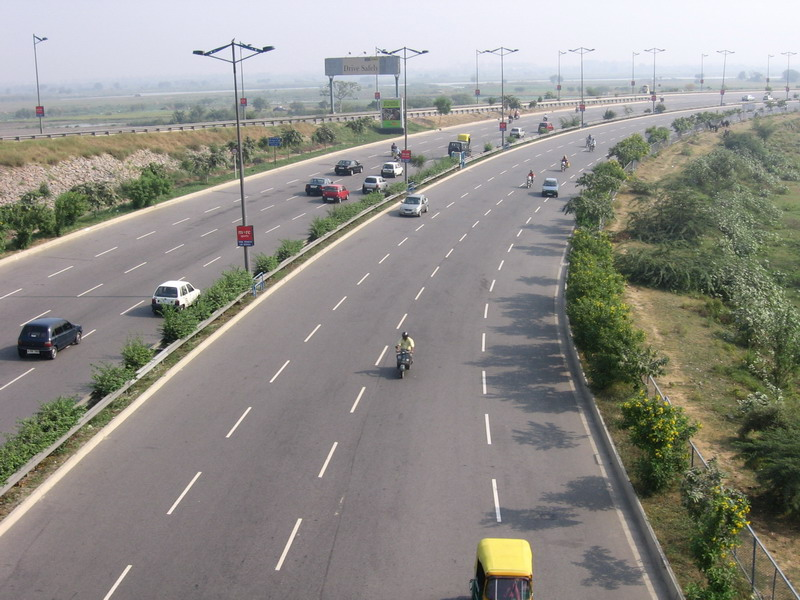
Delhi–Noida Direct (DND Flyway), India's first eight-lane expressway

On 24 January 2001, the eight-lane 7.5 km (4.7 mi) long DND Flyway between Delhi city and Noida was operationalized, becoming the first urban expressway in India. Following Mumbai-Pune, Ahmedabad–Vadodara Expressway was then opened between the cities of Ahmedabad and Vadodara in Gujarat on 16 August 2004. While this expressway was operationalised two years later, it was designated as National Expressway 1 (NE-1) back in 1986 by the Government of India.

In 2009, with the advent of new expressway infrastructures coming up across India, the Ministry of Road Transport and Highways (MoRTH) was preparing to set-up National Expressways Authority of India (NEAI) to be in-charge of the construction and maintenance of expressways, however, the Ministry did not proceed with the creation of NEAI for unspecified reasons and NHAI continued to remain in-charge.

=== Bharatmala pariyojana ===
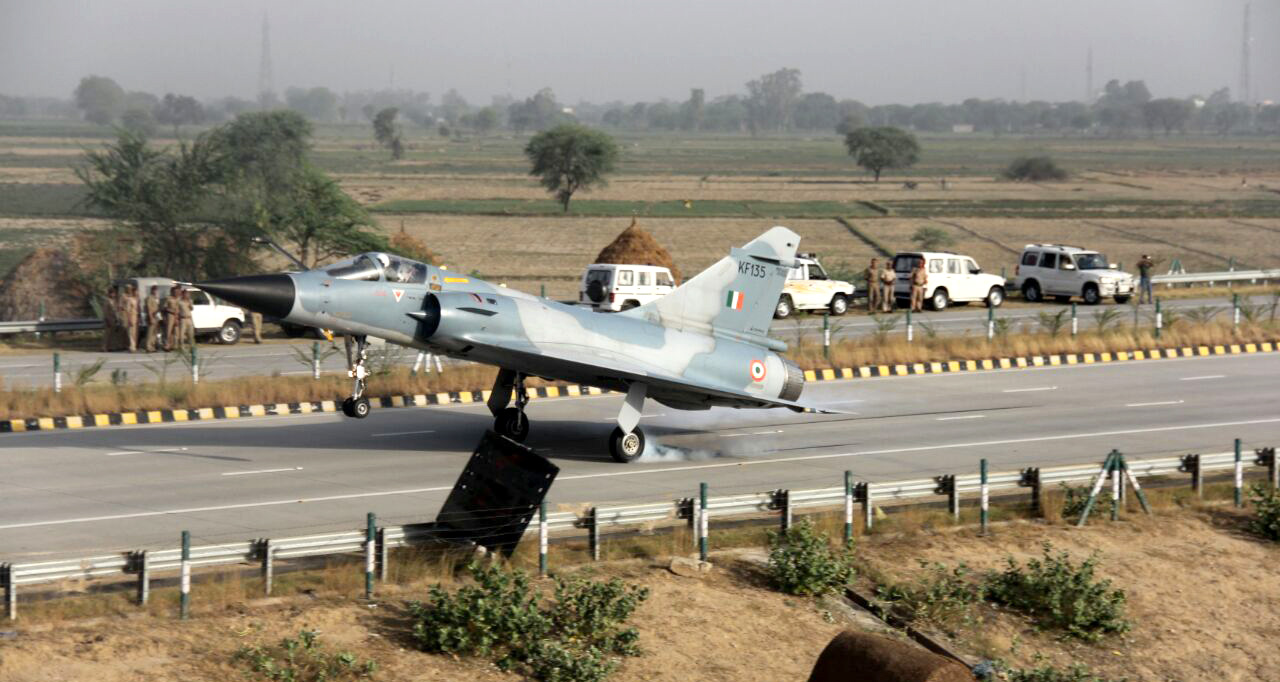
Indian Air Force (IAF) Dassault Mirage 2000 landing at Yamuna Expressway, in Uttar Pradesh on May 20, 2015

Prior to being subsumed under Bharatmala Pariyojana (lit. 'India garland project'), the government of India had launched National Highways Development Project (NHDP) in 1998 as a seven-step flagship project to construct highest class roads in India and to upgrade the existing ones. The phase-4 of which included the development of 1,000 km (620 mi) of expressways at an indicative cost of ₹15,000 crore (equivalent to ₹740 billion or US$7.9 billion in 2026). In 2017, under Bharatmala about 1,900 km (1,200 mi) km of corridors had been identified for development of new expressways, of which 800 km (500 mi) were taken up under phase-1 of the project.

In the 2010s, the states of Maharashtra and Uttar Pradesh took keen interest in investing in expressways through dedicated expressway corporations of MSRDC and UPEIDA respectively. While Maharashtra led by MSRDC completed its second expressway with 701 km (436 mi) long Mumbai–Nagpur Expressway in June 2025, Uttar Pradesh had built four new expressways namely; Bundelkhand, Purvanchal, Agra–Lucknow and Yamuna expressways by the turn of early 2020s. On 21 May 2015, in a first for military aviation and expressway infrastructure in India, the Indian Air Force's Dassault Mirage 2000 successfully landed on the Yamuna Expressway near Mathura in a mock-drill to evaluate the utility of using highways and expressways for emergency landings by military aircraft.

In 2024, the government of India presented an ambitious 'Vision 2047' plan envisioning the construction of up to 50,000 km (31,000 mi) of access-controlled highways and expressways, with Indians gaining access to the expressways at a distance of 100–125 km (62–78 mi) from any point in the country. The ministry of road transport and highways (MoRTH) had also been finalising new guidelines to improve and standardise infrastructure along the already-developed highways with wayside amenities. Satellite-based tolling was also proposed to be started on 10-15 stretches in the same year.

=== Timeline ===
Total length of Expressways in India every fiscal year (in km)
Year	Total length
2025-2026	7,112
2024–2025	6,059
2023–2024	5,145
2022–2023	3,629
2021–2022	2,501
2020–2021	2,002
2019–2020	1,989
2018–2019	1,762
2017–2018	1,323
2016–2017	1,021
2015–2016	1,021
2014–2015	1,021
2013–2014	1,004
2012–2013	988
2011–2012	580
2010–2011	580
2009–2010	534
2008–2009	438
2007–2008	384
2006–2007	384
2005–2006	343
2004–2005	253
2003–2004	160
2002–2003	160
2001–2002	33

== Designation ==
=== Expressway categories ===
Expressways in India are designated into three main categories:

- National Expressways (NE): Managed by NHAI under the Ministry of Road Transport and Highways (MoRTH), these are the medium to long-distance expressways which connect the major cities of India. Delhi–Mumbai Expressway, designated as National Expressway-4 (NE-4) is one such example of a National Expressway.
- Economic Corridors (EC): Also managed by NHAI under MoRTH, these expressways are being built across various Industrial corridors of India. Amritsar–Jamnagar Expressway, designated as Economic Corridor-3 (EC-3) is an example of Industrial expressway.
- State Expressways (SE): These are the regional expressways undertaken by respective state governments to connect the cities within a state. Mumbai–Nagpur Expressway undertaken by Maharashtra state-government's MSRDC is an example for regional expressway undertaken by the Maharashtra state government.
- Urban expressways: Additionally some urban governments and municipalities have also constructed expressways within or near urban areas to facilitate decongestion and faster movement within cities. DND Flyway between Delhi and Noida is an example for toll-free urban expressway.
- Bypass expressways: Bypass expressways are constructed to divert the through-traffic, away from urban areas and city centres. They reduce urban pollution and improve travel speed. Chennai Bypass Road is an example that is built to bypass Chennai.
- Spur expressways: Spur expressways in India are short corridors that branch off from a main expressway to connect important cities, towns, industrial zones or border areas, thus enhancing the regional connectivity. The 41 km (25 mi) long Nakodar–Amritsar spur section which branches off from the Delhi–Katra Expressway is an example.

=== Greenfield and brownfield expressways ===
Greenfield Expressways in India are new expressways, built on the new alignments to facilitate the economy of the areas they pass through. These newly built expressways allow for speeds up to 120 km/h (75 mph) and typically have space reserved between the carriages to allow for a future expansion. Delhi–Mumbai Expressway is an example which is being built with eight-lanes and a reserved space in the median to allow for future expansion of up to twelve lanes. Brownfield Expressways in India backed by 'Brownfield National Highway Project' (BNHP) are a series of projects undertaken to widen/re-develop existing national highways that have high traffic demand. The upgradation usually involves expansion of lanes from four to six, such as Delhi–Panipat Expressway.

== Design standards ==
=== Access ===
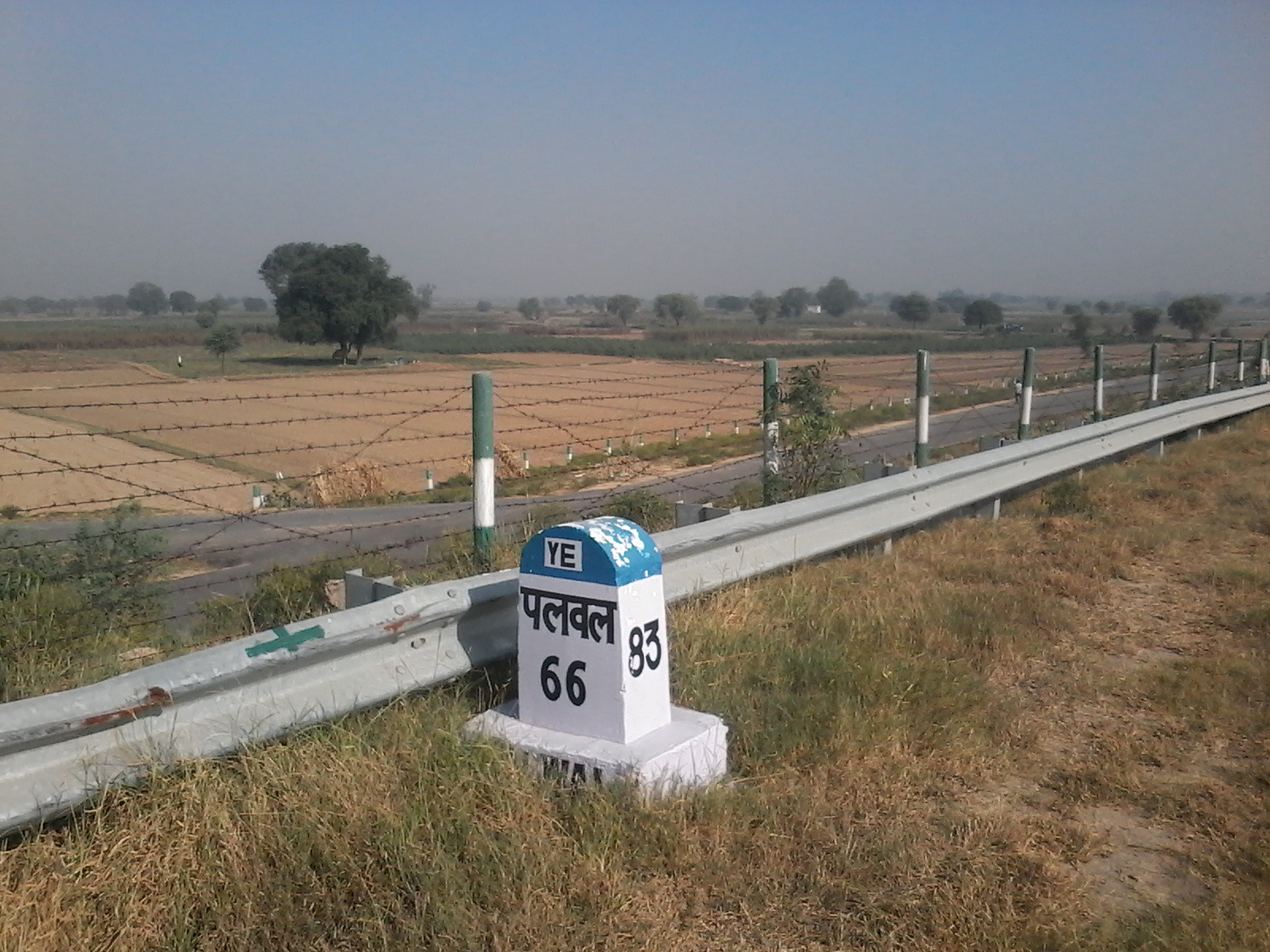
Fencing behind a milestone on Yamuna Expressway in Uttar Pradesh

Access-control on Indian expressways offers uninterrupted high-speed travel and safety. It is mainly achieved through fencing, Grade separation with over-passes and under-passes, barriers or medians and with additional dedicated service roads for local traffic. Fully access-controlled expressways do not allow access from side roads, villages or properties but only via inter-changes. Partially access-controlled expressways allow access at some at-grade junctions and minor road crossings may exist. Non access-controlled roads are conventional highways that have a mix of local and through traffic without any entry restrictions.

=== Carriageways ===
All Indian expressways have dual carriageways, one for each direction, separated by a median. Each carriageway typically has at least two lanes, with three to four lanes also being common. Most Greenfield expressways have a reserved space between the carriages for future expansion in number of lanes. Some expressways utilise concrete or metal beam crash barriers for safety. Paved shoulders or emergency lanes also exist beside each carriageway to support during the event of accident. Service lanes on each direction are often provided outside the fenced area for local traffic.

The Indian Roads Congress (IRC) has specified guidelines for designing access-controlled highways with its IRC:SP:99-2013 standard. It specifies a standard lane width of 3.5 m (11 ft) with paved shoulders having a width of 2–2.5 m (6 ft 7 in – 8 ft 2 in) and unpaved shoulders having 1 m (3 ft 3 in) width.

=== Interchanges ===
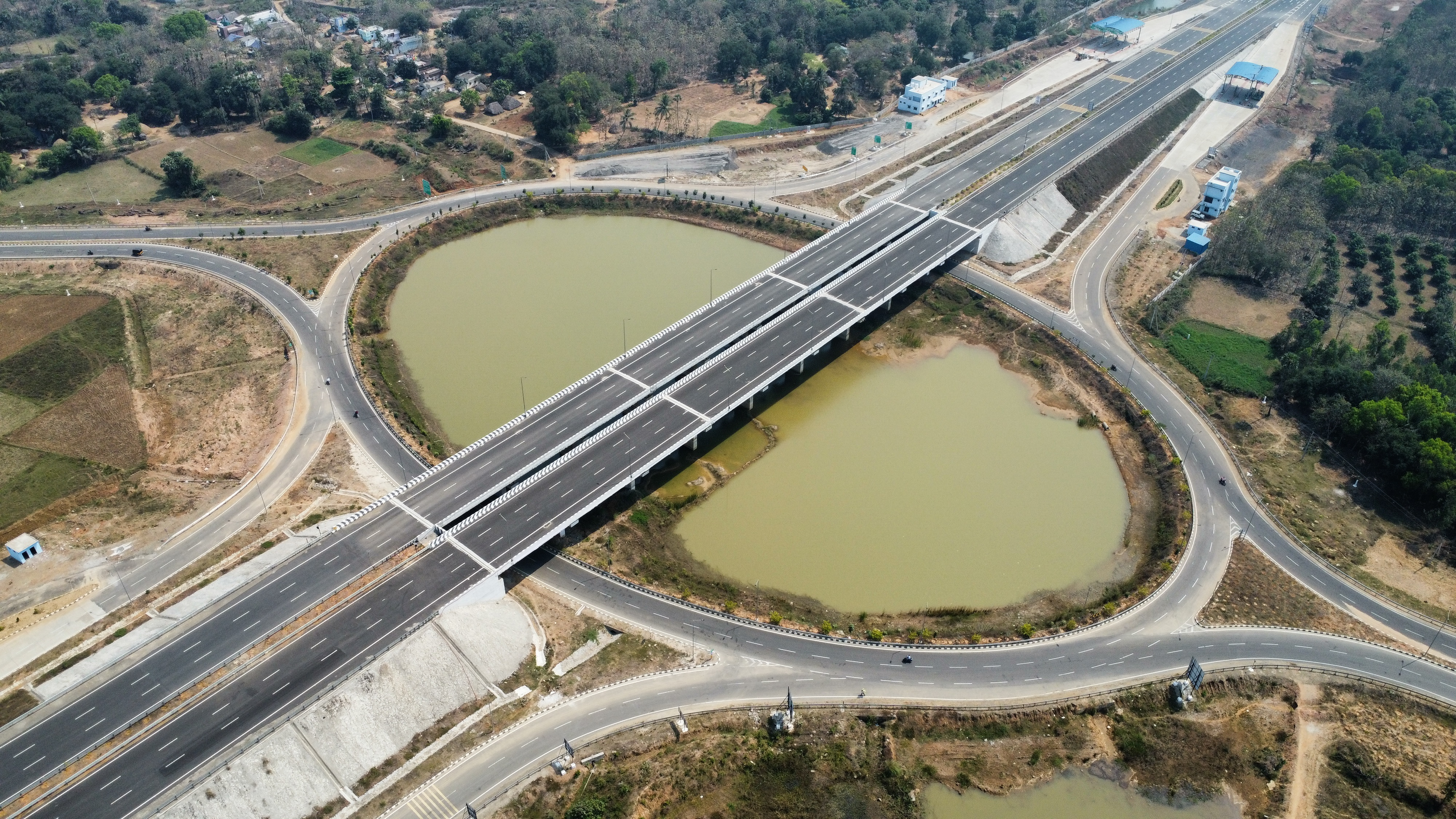
Aerial view of single point diamond interchange (SPDI) interchange on Raipur–Visakhapatnam Expressway

Inter-changes are junctions that connect expressway with other roads, highways or other expressways without interrupting the flow of traffic. They improve safety by eliminating right-angle collisions. Indian expressways have various interchanges designed for suitability. System interchanges—such as cloverleaf, three-way, trumpet connect with other national or state highways. Service interchanges—such as Single Point Diamond Interchange (SPDI) are used for connecting smaller roads.

The design of inter-changes for Indian expressways and highways are governed by IRC:SP:99-2013 and Ministry of Road Transport and Highways (MoRTH) guidelines. While Cloverleaf interchanges require at least 20-30 acres of land, directional flyovers require less. The inter-change designs include acceleration/deceleration lanes for safe merging.

=== Speed ===
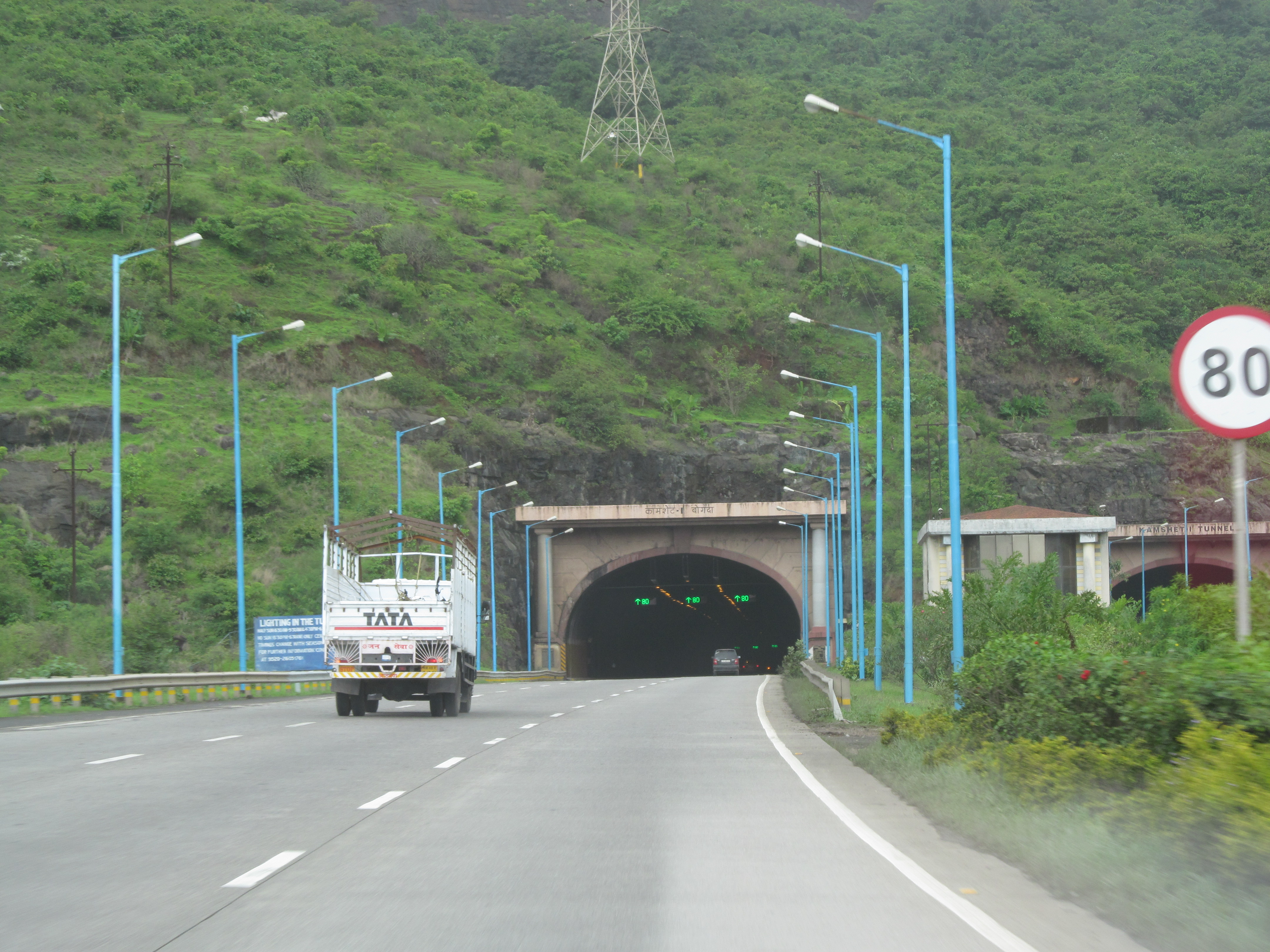
Speed limit of 80 km/h (50 mph) shown on signage at Mumbai–Pune Expressway

High-speed travel is a key feature on Indian expressways unlike conventional highways where speeds are low due to local traffic and cattle interruptions. The Ministry of Road Transport and Highways (MoRTH) has set speed limits based on road geometry and vehicle type. Some Greenfield expressways are designed for speeds up to 150 km/h (93 mph) but are legally capped at 120 km/h (75 mph) for safety, with some expressways capped as low as 100 km/h (62 mph). For heavy vehicles such as buses and trucks, it is usually capped at 80–100 km (50–62 mi). The minimum designed speed on ramps on inter-changes per IRC is 40–60 km (25–37 mi).

Speed limits on Indian expressways
Expressway type	Max enforced limit	Design speed
Greenfield expressways	120 km/h (75 mph)	150 km/h (93 mph)
Brownfield expressways	100–120 km/h (62–75 mph)	100–120 km/h (62–75 mph)
Urban expressways	70–90 km/h (43–56 mph)	80–100 km/h (50–62 mph)

== Infrastructure ==
=== Tolls ===
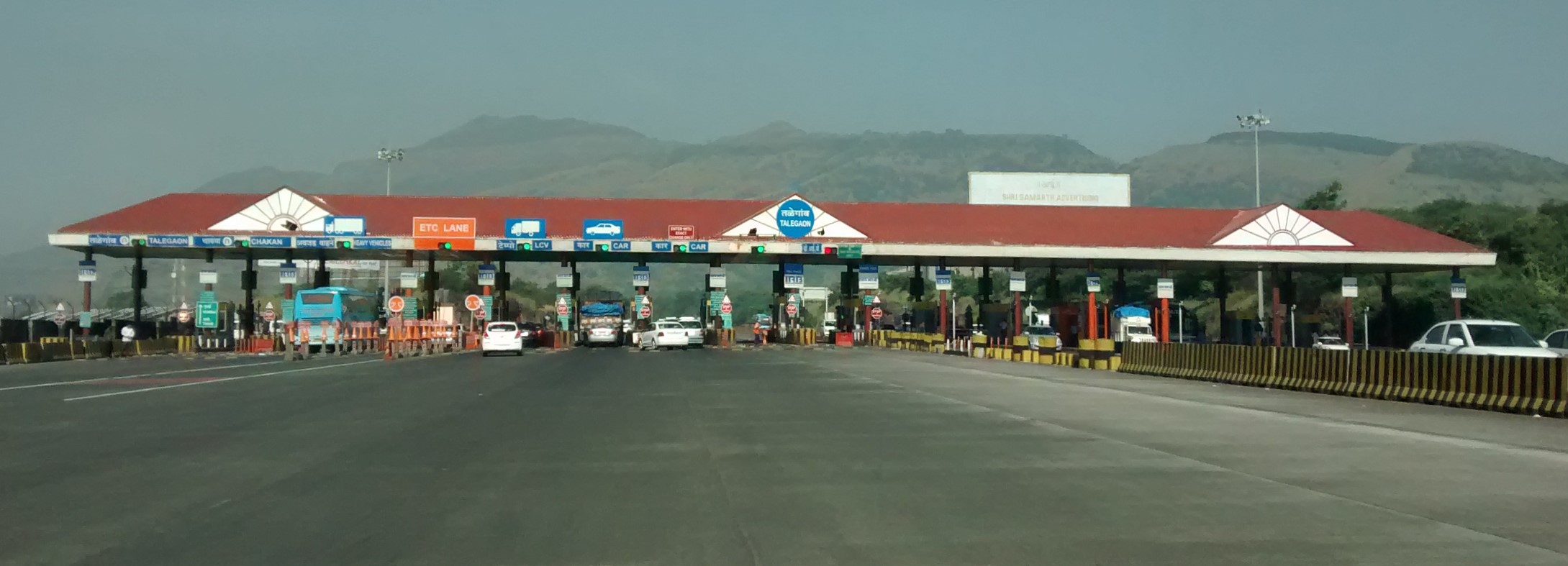
Talegaon toll booth on Mumbai–Pune Expressway

Expressways in India, excluding some urban ones, are tolled. They are implemented to recover cost of construction, maintenance and operations, and are primarily managed by NHAI under MoRTH. The tolls are levied based on vehicle category, type of expressway and distance travelled. They form a great source of revenue for funding the expanding expressway network in India. Only designated interchanges allow entry and exit into the tolls. Rates of tolls are revised every year on April 1, based on the Wholesale price index (WPI) to adjust for inflation.

=== FASTag ===
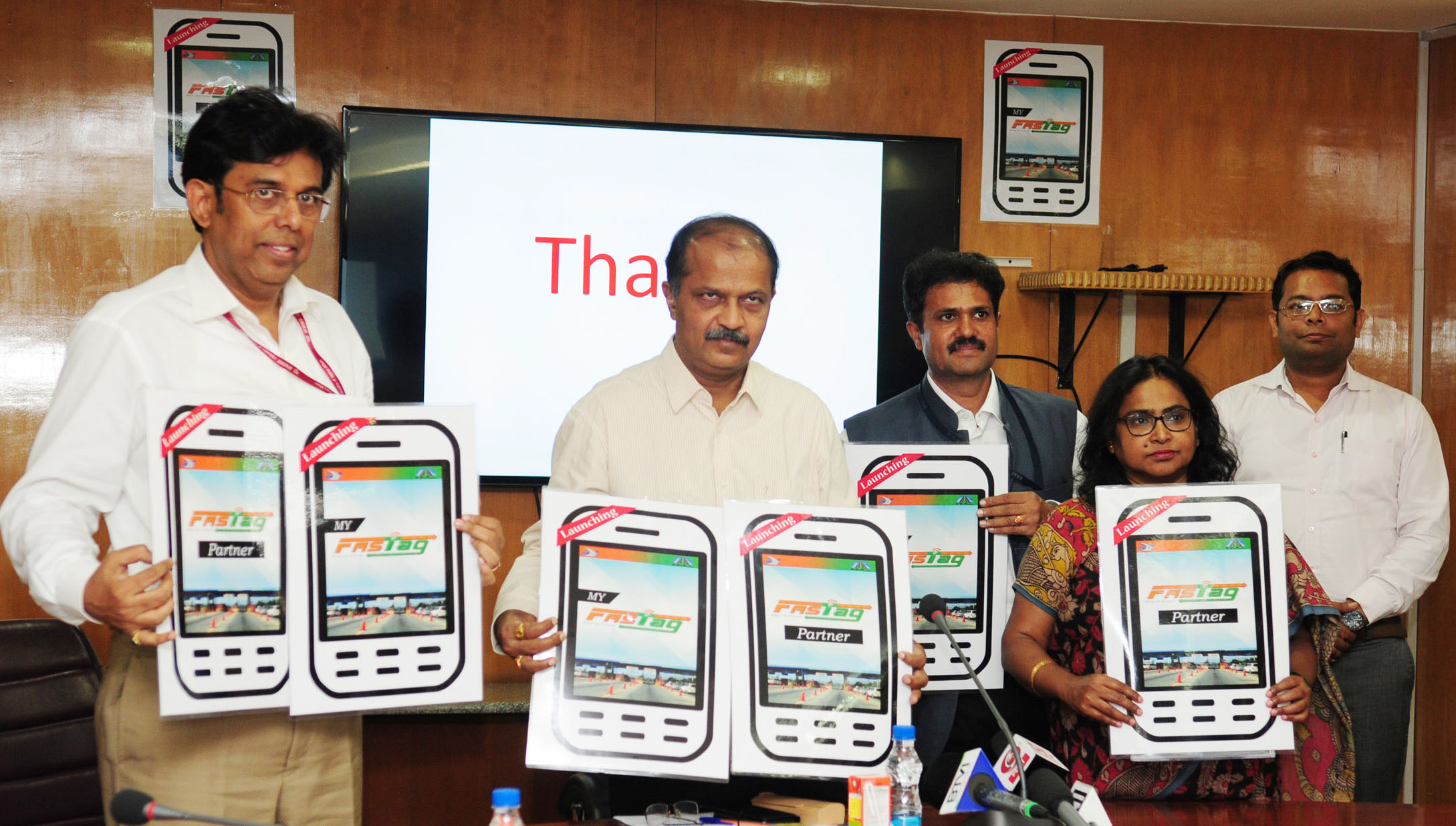
Chairperson of NHAI Shri Deepak Kumar launching the Mobile Apps named 'My FASTag' and 'FASTag Partner' in New Delhi on 17 August 2017

FASTag is an electronic toll collection (ETC) system operated in India by NHAI under MoRTH. It uses Radio-frequency identification (RFID) technology to enable automatic deduction of toll charges at toll plazas on Indian expressways, allowing for vehicles to pass without stopping for toll transactions.

The FASTag system is based on the National Electronic Toll Collection (NTEC) programme developed by the National Payments Corporation of India (NPCI) as a part of India's efforts to digitise highway infrastructure and reduce congestion on toll plazas. It was launched in 2014 as a pilot project on the Ahmedabad–Mumbai section of Golden Quadrilateral highway. From 15 February 2021, fastag became mandatory for all four-wheeled vehicles on national highways.

=== Wayside amenities ===
Offered by NHAI under MoRTH, Wayside Amenities (WSAs) are dedicated rest and service facilities located along Indian expressways and other national highways to improve road travel comfort, safety, and logistics. They offer rest, food, fuel, charging stations and similar services to both passengers and freight vehicles, thus helping in reducing driver fatigue, supporting logistics movement and in promoting 'highway tourism'. They are typically located at intervals of 40–50 km (25–31 mi) along expressways. In June 2025, NHAI announced an ambitious plan of establishing over 1000 WSAs over a period of five years under Public–private partnership. The WSAs in the plan include setting up of fuel stations and EV charging points, food courts, dhabas and restaurants, convenience stores, medical and childcare rooms, promotional spaces for local artisans, drone landing facilities and helipads at larger sites.

== Financing ==
The financing of Indian expressways is achieved through a combination of public funding, private investment, multilateral lending and via tolls. Ministry of Road Transport and Highways (MoRTH) sets policy and budget allocations while National Highways Authority of India (NHAI) is responsible for implementation and collection of tolls. The private sector entities participate through various Public–private partnership models. A significant amount of funding for expressways comes from central government allocations, especially under Bharatmala Pariyojana. In the 2023–24 Union budget of India, MoRTH was allocated ₹270,000 crore (US$29 billion), of which a large share was dedicated for expressways and economic corridor developments. In 2024–25, NHAI earned over ₹41,000 crore (US$4.4 billion) in toll revenue, with projections of ₹130,000 crore (US$14 billion) by 2030 through FASTag and monetisation of roads.

== National expressways ==
=== Operational national expressways ===
The following list contains operational national expressways built and operated by National Highways Authority of India (NHAI).

Overview of fully and partially operational national expressways of India
Expressway	Sign	Terminus	Locale	Length	Operational length	Lanes	Type	Status	Opening
Ahmedabad–Dholera		Sarkhej, Ahmedabad – Adhelai, Bhavnagar district	Gujarat	109 km (68 mi)	109 km	4–6	Intrastate	Operational	31 March 2026
Ahmedabad–Vadodara		Jashodha Nagar, Ahmedabad – Dumad, Vadodara	Gujarat	93.1 km (57.8 mi)	93.1 km	4	Intrastate	Operational	16 August 2004
Amritsar–Jamnagar	EC-3	Tibba, Kapurthala – Jamnagar	Punjab, Haryana, Rajasthan and Gujarat	1,256.95 km (781.03 mi)	650 km	6	Inter-state economic corridor	Partially opened	1 December 2025
Bengaluru–Chennai		Hosakote – Sriperumbudur	Karnataka, Andhra Pradesh and Tamil Nadu	258 km (160 mi)	100 km	4	Inter-state	Partially opened	1 June 2026
Delhi–Dehradun		Delhi – Dehradun	Delhi, Uttar Pradesh and Uttarakhand	210 km (130 mi)	210 km (130 mi)	6	Inter-state	Operational	14 April 2026
Delhi–Faridabad		Badarpur, Delhi – Sector 37, Faridabad	Delhi NCR	4.4 km (2.7 mi)	4.4 km (2.7 mi)	6	Urban brownfield	Operational	29 November 2010
Delhi–Gurgaon		Manesar, Gurgaon – Arjun Vihar, Delhi	Delhi NCR	27.7 km (17.2 mi)	27.7 km (17.2 mi)	6–8	Urban brownfield	Operational	23 January 2008
Delhi–Meerut		Nizamuddin Bridge, New Delhi – Partapur, Meerut	Delhi and Uttar Pradesh	96 km (60 mi)	96 km (60 mi)	6–14	Inter-state	Operational	1 April 2021
Delhi–Mumbai		Sohna EC, Delhi – JNPT, Mumbai	Delhi, Haryana, Rajasthan, Madhya Pradesh, Gujarat and Maharashtra	1,350 km (840 mi)	966 km	8	Inter-state	Partially opened	1 October 2025
Delhi–Panipat Expressway		Delhi – Panipat	Delhi NCR	70.5 km (43.8 mi)	70.5 km (43.8 mi)	8	Inter-state brownfield	Operational	20 June 2023
Durgapur Expressway		Dankuni – Durgapur	West Bengal	154 km(95.7 mi)	134 km	6	Intrastate brownfield	Partially opened	2025
JNPT Road		Navi Mumbai, Maharashtra	Maharashtra	28 km (17.4 mi)	28 km (17.4 mi)	6	Urban	Operational	5 May 2022
Jaipur–Bandikui		Jaipur – Bandikui	Rajasthan	67 km (42 mi)	67 km (42 mi)	4	Intrastate spur	Operational	15 July 2025
Kona		Hastings, Kolkata – NH 16, Nibra, Howrah	West Bengal	11 km(6.8 mi)	7.2 km	6	Urban brownfield	Partially opened	3 December 2026
Mumbai-Nashik		Nashik – Thane	Maharashtra	150 km (93 mi)	150 km (93 mi)	4-6	Intrastate	Operational	2009
Raipur–Bilaspur		Tatibandh, Bilaspur district – Tatibandh, Raipur	Chhattisgarh	127 km (79 mi)	127 km (79 mi)	4–6	Intrastate brownfield	Operational	1 May 2019
Sohna Elevated Corridor		Gurgaon, Sohna	Haryana	21.65 km (13.5 mi)	21.65 km (13.5 mi)	6	Urban	Operational	2022
Trans-Haryana (Ambala–Narnaul)		Ghangheri, Kurukshetra district – Surana, Mahendragarh district	Haryana	227 km (141 mi)	227 km (141 mi)	6	Intrastate	Operational	1 August 2022
Awadh (Kanpur–Lucknow)		Azad Chauraha, Kanpur – Shaheed Path, Lucknow	Uttar Pradesh	62.76 km (39.00 mi)	62.76 km (39.00 mi)	6	Intrastate	Operational	13 July 2026
Total				4380.85 km	3208.55 km				

=== Under-construction national expressways ===
Overview of under-construction national expressways of India
Expressway	Sign	Terminus	Locale	Length	Lanes	Type	Construction began	Opening
Amas–Darbhanga		Amas, Gaya, Patna, Darbhanga	Bihar	189 km (117 mi)	4–6	Intrastate	2022	2026
Agra - Gwalior		Agra, Dholpur, Gwalior	Uttar Pradesh, Rajasthan and Madhya Pradesh	88 km	6	Inter-state greenfield	2026	TBD
Chittoor–Thatchur Expressway	NH-716B	Chittoor - Thatchur	Andra Pradesh, Tamil Nadu	117 km	6	Inter-state	2023	2027
Ambala-Shamli		Sadopur, Ambala district – Gogwan Jalalpur, Shamli district	Haryana and Uttar Pradesh	121 km (75 mi)	6	Inter-state	2023	2026
Bengaluru–Vijayawada		Bengaluru – Vijaywada	Karnataka, Andhra Pradesh	518 km (322 mi)	6	Inter-state	2023	2028
Delhi–Katra		Bahadurgarh border, Delhi – Katra	Delhi, Haryana, Punjab, Jammu and Kashmir	670 km (420 mi)	4	Inter-state	2021	31 December 2026
Durg–Arang		Tendesara, Rajnandgaon district – Mahanadi Bridge, Arang	Chhattisgarh	92 km (57 mi)	6	Intrastate	2022	30 June 2028
Faridabad–Ghaziabad		Greater Faridabad, Faridabad – Rahul Vihar, Ghaziabad	Uttar Pradesh and Haryana	56 km (35 mi)	6	Inter-state	2025	2027
Ghaziabad-Kanpur Expressway		Ghaziabad – Kanpur	Uttar Pradesh	380 km (240 mi)	6	Intrastate	2025	2026
Hyderabad–Indore		Hyderabad – Indore	Telangana, Maharashtra and Madhya Pradesh	713 km (443 mi)	4	Inter-state greenfield	2024	2026
Ludhiana–Ajmer	EC-8	Ludhiana – Ajmer	Punjab, Haryana and Rajasthan	600 km (370 mi)	6	Inter-state economic corridor	2025	TBD
Khammam–Devarapalli Expressway	NH-365BG	Khammam - Devarapalle	Telangana, Andhra Pradesh	162.1 km	6	Inter-state	2026	TBD
Ludhiana–Rupnagar	NH-205K	Ludhiana – Rupnagar	Punjab, Himachal Pradesh	37.7 km (23.4 mi)	6	Inter-state economic corridor	2026	TBD
Sirhind-Mohali Expressway		Sirhind – Mohali	Punjab	27.37 km (17.01 mi)	6	Inter-state economic corridor	2026	TBD
Nagpur–Vijayawada		Nagpur – Vijaywada	Maharashtra, Telangana and Andhra Pradesh	405 km (252 mi)	4	Inter-state economic corridor	2023	2029
Paniyala–Barodamev		Paniyala Mod, Kotputli – Barodamev, Alwar	Haryana and Rajasthan	86.5 km (53.7 mi)	6	Inter-state economic corridor	2024	2028
Raipur–Dhanbad	EC-7	Dharsiwa, Raipur district – Dhanbad	Chhattisgarh and Jharkhand	707 km (439 mi)	4	Inter-state economic corridor	2023	2026
Raipur–Hyderabad		Patan, Raipur – Hyderabad	Chhattisgarh, Maharashtra and Telangana	530 km (330 mi)	6	Inter-state	2023	2028
Raipur–Visakhapatnam		Abhanpur, Raipur district – Visakhapatnam Port, Visakhapatnam	Chhattisgarh, Odisha and Andhra Pradesh	464 km (288 mi)	6	Inter-state economic corridor	2022	2028
Nashik–Chennai		Nashik district – Chennai district	Maharashtra, Karnataka, Telangana, Andhra Pradesh and Tamil Nadu	900 km (560 mi)	6	Inter-state	2023	2029
Ujjain-Garoth	NH-752D	Ujjain – Garoth	Madhya Pradesh	136.1 km (84.6 mi)	4	Intrastate spur	November 2022	
Urban Extension Road-II	NH-344M	Alipur – Mahipalpur	Delhi NCR	75.7 km (47.0 mi)	6	Urban	2021	2025
Varanasi–Kolkata	NH-319B	Varanasi Ring Road, Chandauli district – Sarisha, Diamond Harbour	Uttar Pradesh, Bihar, Jharkhand, West Bengal	710 km (440 mi)	6	Inter-state	2024	2029
Gorakhpur–Siliguri		Gorakhpur - Siliguri	Uttar Pradesh, Bihar, West Bengal	519 km (322 mi)	4	Inter-state	2025	2030
Ghazipur–Ballia–Manjhi	NH-31	Ghazipur - Manjhi	Uttar Pradesh, Bihar	134 km	4	Inter-state	2026	TBD
Jalbehra-Shahbad	NH-152G	Jalbehra - Shahbad	Haryana	22.8 km	4	Inter-state	2026	TBD
Jind-Gohana	NH-352A	Jind - Gohana	Haryana	40.66 km	4	Inter-state	2026	TBD
Jhansi Link Expressway		Bundelkhand	Uttar Pradesh	106.3 km	6	Inter-state	2026	TBD
Jewar Link Expressway	NH-352A	Noida International Airport - Faridabad	Uttar Pradesh, Haryana	31.4 km	6	Inter-state	2026	TBD
Farrukhabad Link Expressway		Etawah - Hardoi	Uttar Pradesh	92 km	6	Inter-state	2026	TBD
Kharagpur–Morgram	NH - 116A	Kharagpur – Morgram	West Bengal	230 km (140 mi)	4	Intrastate	2025	March /April 2029

=== Proposed national expressways ===
Overview of proposed national expressways of India
Expressway	Terminus	Locale	Length	Lanes	Type	Proposed in
Atal Setu Connector	Chirle-Bhatan	Maharashtra	7.35 km (4.57 mi)	6	Intrastate	2026
Chambal (Kota-Morena-Etawah)	Seemalya, Kota district – Nanawa, Etawah district	Rajasthan, Madhya Pradesh and Uttar Pradesh	404 km (251 mi)	6	Inter-state	2017
Bhopal–Indore	Kalan, Bhopal – Karnawad, Indore district	Madhya Pradesh	157 km (98 mi)	6	Intrastate	2025
Gwalior - Lakhnadon Expressway	Jourasi Gwalior - Lakhnadon	Madhya Pradesh and Uttar Pradesh	530 km (329 mi)	6	Inter-state	2024
Gwalior - Nagpur Expressway	Gwalior - Nagpur	Madhya Pradesh and Maharashtra	570 km (354 mi)	6	Inter-state	2026
Haldia–Raxaul	Haldia – Mehsi, Raxaul	West Bengal, Jharkhand and Bihar	650 km (400 mi)	6	Inter-state	2022
Kharagpur–Visakhapatnam	Kharagpur – Visakhapatnam	West Bengal, Odisha and Andhra Pradesh	783 km (487 mi)	6	Inter-state	2025
Nagpur–Bengaluru	Nagpur – Bengaluru Rural district	Maharashtra, Telangana, Andhra Pradesh and Karnataka	1,300 km (810 mi)	8	Inter-state	2025
Narmada	Amarkantak – Alirajpur	Madhya Pradesh	1,100 km (680 mi)	8	Intrastate	2020
Panipat–Dabwali	Panipat district – Dabwali, Sirsa district	Haryana	300 km (190 mi)	4	Intrastate	2025
Pune–Bengaluru	Pune – Bengaluru rural district	Maharashtra and Karnataka	700 km (430 mi)	8	Inter-state	2022
Delhi–Jaipur Super Expressway	Delhi – Jaipur	Rajasthan, Haryana	195 km (121 mi)	8	Inter-state	TBD
Bokaro-Ranchi–Jamshedpur	Bokaro Steel City - Ranchi district – Jamshedpur	Jharkhand	250 km (160 mi)	4	Intrastate brownfield	2025
Thiruvananthapuram–Angamaly	Pulimath, Thiruvananthapuram district – Angamaly, Ernakulam district	Kerala	257 km (160 mi)	6	Intrastate	2023 (Stalled)
Chennai-Coimbatore	Coimbatore-Chennai	Tamilnadu	450 Km (279 mi)	8	Intrastate Economic Corridor	2027
Chennai-Kanyakumari	Chennai- Kanyakumari	Tamilnadu	700 Km (435 mi		Intrastate Economic Corridor	2027

== Bypass expressways ==
=== Operational bypass expressways ===
Overview of fully and partially operational bypass expressways of India
Bypassing city	Expressway	Sign	Terminals	Locale	Length	Lanes	Owner	Status	Opening
Bengaluru	Satellite Town Ring		Dobbaspet, Bengaluru Rural district – Hosur	Karnataka and Tamil Nadu	280.8 km (174.5 mi)	4–6	NHAI	Partially opened	December 2025
Chennai	Chennai Bypass		Puzhal, Chennai – Perungalathur, Chennai	Tamil Nadu	32 km (20 mi)	6	NHAI	Operational	2010
Delhi	Eastern Peripheral		Kundli, Sonipat – Dholgarh, Palwal	Haryana and Uttar Pradesh	135 km (84 mi)	6	NHAI	Operational	27 May 2018
Delhi	Western Peripheral		Kundli, Sonipat – Dholgarh, Palwal	Haryana	135.6 km (84.3 mi)	6	HSIIDC	Operational	19 November 2019
Gurgaon	Dwarka Expressway		Mahipalpur, Delhi – Kherli Daula, Gurgaon	Delhi and Haryana	27.6 km (17.1 mi)	8	NHAI	Operational	11 March 2024
Hyderabad	Outer Ring		Gachibowli – Narsingi, Ranga Reddy district	Telangana	158 km (98 mi)	8	GHMC	Operational	15 July 2016
Jaipur	Jaipur Ring Road	NH148	Bagrana – Mahapura	Rajasthan	147 km (91 mi)	6	JDA	Operational	19 November 2020
Kolkata	Belghoria Expressway	NH12	Dakshineswar, Kolkata – NSCBIA, Kolkata	West Bengal	16 km (9.9 mi)	4	NHAI	Operational	2008
Lucknow	Lucknow Outer Ring		Bakshi Ka Talab	Uttar Pradesh	104 km (65 mi)	8	NHAI	Operational	March 2024
Ludhiana	Ludhiana Elevated Corridor		Octroi post – Samrala Roundabout	Punjab	13 km (8.1 mi)	4	NHAI	Operational	January 2024
Mumbai and Thane	Mumbai Trans-harbour		Sewri, South Mumbai – Chirle, Navi Mumbai	Mumbai MR	21.8 km (13.5 mi)	6	MMRDA	Operational	12 January 2024
Nashik	Nashik Freeway		Pathardi – Adgaon	Maharashtra	14 km (8.7 mi)	6	NHAI	Operational	14 June 2013
Panipat	Panipat Elevated Corridor		Sewah – Sector-18	Haryana	10 km (6.2 mi)	6	Panipat Elevated Corridor Limited (PECL)	Operational	16 July 2008
Prayagraj	Prayagraj Bypass		Kokhraj, Prayagraj – Handia, Prayagraj	Uttar Pradesh	84.7 km (52.6 mi)	4	NHAI	Operational	2009
Prayagraj	Prayagraj Ring Road		Dandupur – Sahasau	Uttar Pradesh	84.7 km (52.6 mi)	4	NHAI	Partially opened	18 June 2026
Varanasi	Varanasi Ring Road		Rakhuana – Barhuli	Uttar Pradesh	63 km (39 mi)	4	NHAI	Partially opened	2025

=== Under-construction bypass expressways ===
Overview of under-construction bypass expressways of India
Bypassing city	Expressway	Locale	Length	Lanes	Owner	Construction began	Opening
Agra	Agra Bypass	Uttar Pradesh	32.8 km (20.4 mi)	6	NHAI	2026	TBD
Azamgarh	Azamgarh Bypass	Uttar Pradesh	15 km (9.3 mi)	4	NHAI	2026	TBD
Bhubaneswar	Bhubaneswar Capital Regional Ring Road	Odisha	110 km (68 mi)	4	NHAI	2022	TBD
Kanpur	Kanpur Outer Ring	Uttar Pradesh	93 km (58 mi)	6	NHAI	2024	2027
Jabalpur	Jabalpur Outer Ring	Madhya Pradesh	112 km (70 mi)	6	NHAI	2024	2027
Jaunpur	Jaunpur Bypass	Uttar Pradesh	12.2 km (7.6 mi)	4	NHAI	2026	TBD
Shimla	Shimla Bypass	Uttarakhand	27 km (17 mi)	4	NHAI	2025	TBD
Pune	Inner Ring Road	Maharashtra	105 km (65 mi)	6	PMRDA	2025	2028
Pune	Outer Ring Road	Maharashtra	161.73 km (100.49 mi)	8	MSRDC	2025	2028
Nashik	Nashik Ring Road	Maharashtra	66.15 km (41.10 mi)	4	MSIDC	2027	
Ambala	Ambala Ring Road	Haryana	40.75 km (25.32 mi)	6	NHAI	2024	2027
Karnal	Karnal Ring Road	Haryana	34.5 km (21.4 mi)	6	NHAI	2024	2027
Rohtak	Rohtak Bypass	Haryana	23 km (14 mi)	4	NHAI	2024	2027
Rewari	Rewari Ring Road	Haryana	15 km (9.3 mi)	4	NHAI	2024	2027
Rudrapur	Rudrapur Bypass	Uttarakhand	20 km (12 mi)	4	NHAI	2024	2027
Meerut	Meerut Outer Bypass	Uttar Pradesh	74 km (46 mi)	6	NHAI	2024	2027
Saharanpur	Saharanpur Bypass	Uttar Pradesh	42 km (26 mi)	6	NHAI	2024	2027
Dehradun	Dehradun Bypass	Uttarakhand	12 km (7.5 mi)	6	NHAI	2024	2027
Haridwar	Haridwar Bypass	Uttarakhand	15 km (9.3 mi)	6	NHAI	2024	
Ambala and Kurali	Ambala-Mohali-Kurali Expressway	Punjab	61.23 km (38.05 mi)	6	NHAI		December 2026

=== Proposed bypass expressways ===
Overview of proposed bypass expressways of India
Bypassing city	Expressway	Sign	Terminals	Locale	Length	Lanes	Owner	Proposed in
Amaravati	Amaravati Outer Ring		Guntur district – Krishna district	Andhra Pradesh	210 km (130 mi)	6	NHAI	2015
Patna	Patna Outer Ring		Vaishali district – Saran district	Bihar	140 km (87 mi)	6	NHAI	2018
Thiruvananthapuram	Thiruvananthapuram OAGC	NH-866	Vizhinjam – Navaikulam	Kerala	80 km (50 mi)	6	NHAI	2020.

== State expressways ==
=== Overview ===
The following list consists non-NHAI built expressways of India, operated by their respective state governments.

States	Expressways	Length operational
Chhattisgarh	1	12.7 km (7.9 mi)
Haryana	1	35 km (22 mi)
Maharashtra	3	812.3 km (504.7 mi)
Uttar Pradesh	5	1,836.45 km (1,141.12 mi)
West Bengal	1	44.17 km (27.45 mi)

=== Operational state expressways ===
Overview of state and other regional expressways in India
Expressway	Sign	Terminus	Locale	Length	Lanes	Type	Operator	Status	Opening
Agra–Lucknow Expressway	—N/a	Hingot Kheria, Agra – Sarosa Bharosa, Lucknow	Uttar Pradesh	302.22 km (187.8 mi)	6	Intra-state	UPEIDA	Operational	21 November 2016
Bundelkhand Expressway	—N/a	Kudrail, Etawah district – Gonda, Chitrakoot district	Uttar Pradesh	296.07 km (184.0 mi)	4	Intra-state	UPEIDA	Operational	16 July 2022
Delhi–Noida Direct Flyway	—N/a	Delhi – Noida	Delhi NCR	7.5 km (4.7 mi)	8	Urban	Noida Toll Bridge Company Ltd. (NTBCL)	Operational	24 January 2001
Eastern Freeway (Mumbai)	—N/a	South Mumbai – Chembur	Mumbai	16.8 km (10.4 mi)	6	Urban	MMRDA	Operational	14 June 2013.
Ganga Expressway		Bijauli, Meerut – Judapur Dandu, Prayagraj	Uttar Pradesh	594 km (369.1 mi)	6	Intra-state	UPEIDA	Operational	29 April 2026
Gorakhpur Link Expressway	—N/a	Jaitpur, Gorakhpur – Salarpur, Azamgarh	Uttar Pradesh	91 km (56.5 mi)	6	Intra-state	UPEIDA	Operational	20 June 2025
Hindon Elevated Road	—N/a	New Delhi, Ghaziabad	Ghaziabad	10.3 km (6.4 mi)	6	Urban	GDA	Operational	2018
Kalyani Expressway	—N/a	Kalyani – Kolkata	West Bengal	44 km (27.3 mi)	6	Intra-state	KMDA	Operational	March 2026
Mumbai–Nagpur Expressway	ME-2	Mumbai – Nagpur	Maharashtra	701 km (435.6 mi)	6	Intra-state	MSRDC	Operational	5 June 2025
Mumbai–Pune Expressway	ME-1	Mumbai – Pune	Maharashtra	94.5 km (58.7 mi)	6	Intra-state	MSRDC	Operational	April 2002
Noida–Bhangel Elevated Corridor	—N/a	Noida	Noida	4.5 km (2.8 mi)	6	Urban	UP State Bridge Corporation Ltd. (UPSBCL)	Operational	19 November 2025
Noida–Greater Noida	—N/a	Mahamaya flyover, Noida – Pari Chowk, Greater Noida	Noida	24.53 km (15.2 mi)	6	Urban	GNIDA	Operational	26 October 2002
Purvanchal Expressway	—N/a	Chand Saray, Lucknow – Haydaria, NH-31, Ghazipur	Uttar Pradesh	340.8 km (211.8 mi)	6	Intra-state	UPEIDA	Operational	16 November 2021
Raipur–Naya Raipur	—N/a	Fafadih, Raipur – Shadani darbar, Naya Raipur	Chhattisgarh	12.7 km (7.9 mi)	6	Urban brownfield	PWD Chhatisgarh	Operational	2019
Yamuna Expressway	YE	Pari Chowk, Greater Noida – Kuberpur (NH-2), Agra	Uttar Pradesh	165.53 km (102.9 mi)	6	Intra-state	Yamuna Expressway Industrial Development Authority (YEIDA) (Note: until 2048)	Operational	9 August 2012

== See also ==
- Transport in India
- Future of rail transport in India
- List of national highways in India
- Ring roads in India
- India–China Border Roads
- Setu Bharatam
- High-speed rail in India
- Urban rail transit in India
- Sagar Mala project
