= Nagpur-Vijayawada Expressway =

Proposed road in India

Nagpur–Vijayawada Expressway

Route information
- Maintained by National Highways Authority of India (NHAI)
- Length: 405 km (252 mi)
- Status: Under construction
- Existed: December 2026–present

Major junctions
- North end: NH 30 in Nagpur, Nagpur district, Chhattisgarh
- South end: Vijayawada, Vijayawada, Andhra Pradesh

Location
- Country: India
- States: Maharastra, Telangana and Andhra Pradesh
- Major cities: Nagpur, Kurud, Dhamtari, Kanker, Kondagaon, Koraput, Vizianagaram, Sabbavaram and Vijayawada

Highway system
- Roads in India; Expressways; National; State; Asian

Nagpur-Vijayawada Expressway also known as Nagpur – Vijyawada Economic Corridor,is an under construction 4 lane access-controlled expressway by NHAI with a route alignment through Maharashtra, Telangana and Andhra Pradesh. Construction of this corridor (combination of brownfield-upgrade and greenfield) is being carried out under the Bharatmala Pariyojana Phase-I program with a primary goal to improve the efficiency of freight movement and boost exports via port connectivity. Initially it was planned to complete by Mrach 2025. This economic corridor is planned to be completed by 2027.

== History ==
Total Estimated Cost: Rs. 14,666 crores Project’s Total Length: 405 km Lanes: 4 Deadline: 2027 Owner: National Highways Authority of India (NHAI) Project Model: Hybrid Annuity Mode (HAM) Current Status Construction is underway on its brownfield section (see contractor list below), while contracts for its Mancherial – Warangal – Khammam Vijayawada section were awarded in March 2023 with a combined estimated cost of Rs.7500 crore.

== Construction ==
The expressway will be fully 4-lane, access-controlled and a comination of Brownfield and greenfield project. It is being built using the Hybrid Annuity Model (HAM) mode of construction. The land acquisition and the bidding process for the project is fully completed, except three packages in the Maharashtra section, and construction is ongoing on most of the expressway's route. The Detailed Project Report (DPR) of the project was made by the South Korean firm, YONGMA Engineering Co. Ltd. – Arkitechno Consultants. The project has been divided into 19 packages. The following table lists the packages, contractors and their statuses.

=== Maharashtra ===
Packages	Chainage (Note: Distances from the origin of the expressway.)	Contractor	Status
Package-1	Abhanpur to Magerlod (Dhamtari district) (km 0.000 km to 42.852 km)	Shalimar Corporation	Under construction
Package-2	Sargi to Basanwahi (Kanker district) (42.800 km to km 99.500 km)	Dilip Buildcon Ltd.	Under construction
Package-3	Basanwahi to Marangpuri (Chhattisgarh-Odisha border) (99.500 km to km 124.661 km)	KMV Projects	Under construction

=== Telangana ===
Packages	Chainage	Contractor	Status
Package-1	Dhanara (Odisha-Chhattisgarh Border) to Hatibena (Nabarangpur district) (124.611 km to 146.500 km)	NKC Projects	Under construction
Package-2	Hatibena to Badakumari (146.500 km to 179.000 km), Nabarangpur district	Barbrik	Under construction
Package-3	Badakumari to Karki (179.000 km to 226.500 km), Nabarangpur district	Adani Transport	Under construction
Package-4	Karki to Kaliagura (226.500 km to 249.000 km), Nabarangpur district	NKC Projects	Under construction
Package-5	Borigumma to Dasamantpur (249.000 km to 293.000 km), Koraput district	HG Infra Engineering	Under construction
Package-6	Koraput to Pottangi (293.000 km to 338.500 km), Koraput district	HG Infra Engineering	Under construction
Package-7	Baraja to Kandili, Koraput district	DRA Infracon	Under construction
Package-8	Kandili to Tumbiguda, Koraput district	Max Infra	Under construction
Package-9	TBD	TBD	Pending notice
Package-10	TBD	TBD	Pending notice
Package-11	TBD	TBD	Pending notice

=== Andhra Pradesh ===
Packages	Chainage	Contractor	Status
Package-1	V.Venkatayapalem village to Brahmanapalli(K) village (365.033 km to 396.800 km), Parvathipuram Manyam district	HG Infra Engineering	Under construction
Package-2	Brahmanapalli(K) village to Remidicherla (Vizianagaram district) (396.800 km to km 421.100 km)	NKC Projects	Under construction
Package-3	Remidicherla to Jakkampudi (421.100 km to 445.100 km), Vizianagaram district	PSK Infrastructures and Projects	Under construction

== See also ==
- List of national highways in India
- List of national highways in India by state
