= Haldia–Raxaul Expressway =

Expressway in India

Route information
- Maintained by National Highways Authority of India
- Length: 650 km (400 mi)

Major junctions
- South end: Haldia
- North end: Greenfield will also be connected to Mehsi of NH27 Raxaul

Location
- Country: India

Highway system
- Roads in India; Expressways; National; State; Asian

The Haldia–Raxaul Expressway is a 650 km (400 mi) long, planned and upcoming access controlled greenfield expressway that will connect Raxaul district of Bihar with Haldia port of West Bengal. This expressway will pass from the Bihar, Jharkhand and West Bengal of India. This project is a part of Bharatmala Pariyojana. This expressway is aimed to reduce the time and distance between the locations.Also, Haldia Port|Haldia port]] currently handles most of Nepal's trade, but there is no developed highway with Haldia port to the India–Nepal border. Haldia-Raxaul Expressway is proposed to be constructed with the aim of establishing better highway connectivity.

== Route ==
=== West Bengal ===
Haldia–Raxaul Expressway starts in Haldia, Purba Medinipur district, West Bengal. It passes through Tamluk, Kolaghat/ Panskura in Purba Medinipur district; Ghatal, Ramjibanpur in Paschim Medinipur district; Bishnupur, Beliatore in Bankura district and Asansol, Chittaranjan in Paschim Bardhaman district in West Bengal and enters Jharkhand state.

=== Jharkhand ===
This expressway passes through Jamtara, Madhupur in Deoghar district and Dumka district in Jharkhand.

=== Bihar ===
This expressway passes through Banka, Munger, Lakhisarai, Begusarai, Samastipur,(Sarfuddinpur, Hathauri, Olipur, Ratanpur Ratan) in Muzaffarpur district, (Narwara) in Sheohar district and (Salemppur, Mehsi, Madhuban, Pakridayal, Khatri East, Lakhaura, Narkatia, Raxaul) in East Champaran district and in Bihar.

== Background ==
Haldia port currently handles most of Nepal's trade, but there is no developed highway with Haldia port to the India–Nepal border. Haldia-Raxaul Expressway is proposed to be constructed with the aim of establishing better highway connectivity.

The 650 km long expressway will serve the primary objective of improving freight efficiency and increasing exports from neighboring regions.

== History ==
The National Highways Authority of India (NHAI) invited tenders in 2021 to prepare a detailed project report for an expressway connecting Raxaul in Bihar on the Indo-Nepal border with the Haldia port in West Bengal. After opening technical bids on 17 June 2021, the National Highways Authority of India announced that 13 design and engineering firms had submitted bids to prepare a detailed project report for the approximately 650 km Raxaul-Haldia Expressway.

== See also ==
- Expressways in India
