= Prayagraj Bypass Expressway =

Road in India

- Prayagraj Bypass
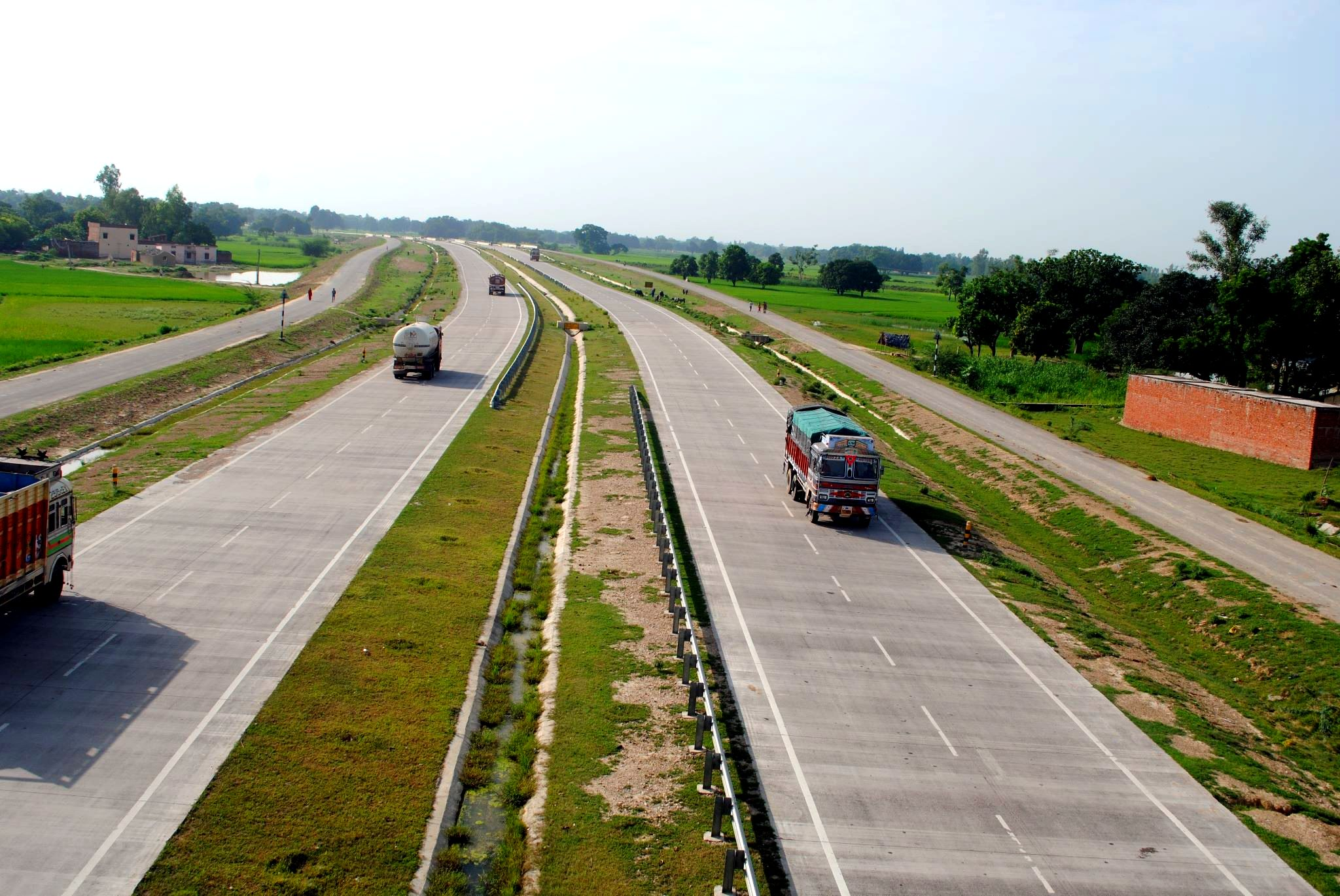
- The Expressway near Sahababpur

Route information
- Maintained by National Highways Authority of India
- Length: 84.7 km (52.6 mi)

Major junctions
- West end: Kokhraj, Prayagraj
- East end: Handia, Prayagraj

Location
- Country: India
- Major cities: Prayagraj

Highway system
- Roads in India; Expressways; National; State; Asian

Prayagraj Bypass Expressway is an 84.708 km (52.635 mi) Controlled-access expressway located in the district of Prayagraj. It is the Asia's longest bypass in terms of length. The project is a section of National Highway 19. It forms the part of the Golden Quadrilateral, under the Kanpur-Prayagraj-Varanasi section of Delhi-Kolkata stretch. The primary purpose of construction was to reduce heavy traffic on the Grand Trunk Road through the city of Prayagraj.

== Construction ==
The total work was divided into 3 contract packages. Construction of road from Km. 158 to 198 (except the Ganges Bridge) was taken up by the National Highways Authority of India with loan assistance from the World Bank. The project consisted of 2.608 km of 4-lane widening of the existing NH-19 and 82.1 km (51.0 mi) of new construction. The Prayagraj Bypass takes off from 158 km (98 mi) of NH-19 (near Kokhraj), runs for 2 km (1.2 mi) along the existing alignment and then for 82.10 km (51.01 mi) along new bypass alignment, north of Prayagraj city. It rejoins the existing alignment of NH-19 (near Handia) and runs another 0.608 km (0.378 mi) to end at 242.708 km (150.812 mi) (NH-19 stationing 245 km (152 mi)). A nearly kilometer long bridge on Ganga was also constructed as a part of the project

== Exits/Interchange ==
The four-laned bypass expressway has 5 exits, including the 2 terminals, that continue as National Highway 2 towards Kanpur and Varanasi. From geographically West to East, the exits are:

- Kokhraj Terminal Exit: Continuing as NH-19 from Kanpur. Exits To Prayagraj City/Bamrauli and Fatehpur/Kanpur.
- Lucknow Road Exit: Interchange for NH 24B. Exits to Prayagraj City and Lucknow/Rai Barreli.
- Ayodhya Road Exit: Interchange for NH 96. Exits to Prayagraj City and Pratapgarh/Sultanpur/Ayodhya.
- Gorakhpur Road Exit: Interchange for SH 7. Exits to Prayagraj City and Jaunpur/Azamgarh/Gorakhpur.
- Handia Terminal Exit: Continues as NH-19 towards Varanasi. Exits To Prayagraj City/Jhunsi and Varanasi/Bhadohi.

== See also ==
Expressways of India
