= Kharagpur–Morgram Expressway =

Road in West Bengal, India

Kharagpur Morgram Expressway

Route information
- Maintained by National Highways Authority of India (NHAI)
- Length: 231 km (144 mi)
- Status: Under construction
- Existed: 2029–present

Major junctions
- Kharagpur end: Kharagpur
- Morgram end: Morgram

Location
- Country: India
- States: West Bengal
- Major cities: Chandrakona, Burdwan, Guskara, Morgram

Highway system
- Roads in India; Expressways; National; State; Asian

The Kharagpur–Morgram Expressway (officially NH 116A) is an under construction greenfield expressway forming the southern segment of the larger 516 km Kharagpur–Siliguri Economic Corridor in West Bengal. Spanning approximately 231 km, this four-lane, access-controlled greenfield expressway aims to significantly reduce travel time and logistics costs between Kharagpur and Morgram, improving connectivity for freight and passenger traffic in the region. The project is being implemented by the National Highways Authority of India (NHAI) under the Bharatmala Pariyojana Phase II (Hybrid Annuity Mode) with an estimated cost of around ₹10,247 crore. The project is planned to be completed in mid 2029.

== Alignment ==
The expressway begins near Kharagpur on National Highway 16 and extends to Moregram at the junction of NH‑34 and NH‑60, passing through key areas such as Chandrakona, Jayrambati, Burdwan, Guskara, and Morgram. Compared to the existing route, this expressway reduces the distance by about 100 km and raises traffic capacity by five times, slashing freight travel time from roughly 9–10 hours to 3–5 hours. This broad corridor enhances connectivity from southern and eastern India to the North-Eastern states via West Bengal.

== Construction ==
The project is divided into five construction packages:

Package 1 (Km 0–41): Kharagpur to Chandrakona Ghatal Road Crossing, awarded to JSP Project Pvt Ltd.

Package 2 (Km 41–89.8): Chandrakona Ghatal Road Crossing to Bowaichandi, awarded to Brij Gopal Construction Pvt. Ltd.

Package 3 (Km 89.8–133): Bowaichandi to Guskara-Katwa Road awarded to Ashoka Buildcon Ltd. at ₹1391 crore.

Package 4 (Km 133–180): Guskara-Katwa Road to Mayurakshi Bridge Approach, awarded to R&C Infraengineers Pvt. Ltd. with a bid around ₹1004.65 crore.

Package 5 (Km 180–230.95): From Mayurakshi Bridge area to Moregram, also awarded to R&C Infra -APS JV.

== Current status ==
Mid-Late 2024: Bidding completed and contractors awarded

December 2025 - pre-construction work like resource mobilisation, soil testing, etc has commenced on few packages.

September/October 2026 - Appointed Date for all the Packages announced - with completion date of March/April 2029.
