= Nashik–Chennai Expressway =

Indian expressway connecting Nashik and Chennai

Route information
- Maintained by National Highways Authority of India (NHAI)
- Length: 1,271 km (790 mi)
- Existed: December 2036 (expected)–present

Major junctions
- North end: Nashik, Maharashtra
- South end: Chennai, Tamil Nadu

Location
- Country: India
- States: Maharashtra, Karnataka, Telangana, Andhra Pradesh and Tamil Nadu
- Major cities: Nashik, Ahilyanagar, Barshi,Dharashiv, Solapur, Kalaburagi,Yadgiri,Raichur, Kurnool, Kadapa,Rajampet ,Tirupati and Chennai

Highway system
- Roads in India; Expressways; National; State; Asian

Nashik–Chennai Expressway is an under-construction, 1,271 km (790 mi) long, 6-lane access-controlled expressway, which will connect the third largest city of Maharashtra, Nashik, with the capital of Tamil Nadu, Chennai, in India. It will pass through six states: Maharashtra, Karnataka, Telangana, Andhra Pradesh and Tamil Nadu. It will be operated and maintained by the National Highways Authority of India (NHAI), and will reduce both travel time and distance from around 35 hours to around 14 hours, and from approximately 1,570 km (980 mi) to 1,271 km (790 mi). It is being built at a cost of ₹ 45,000 crore (~US$5.5 billion), which was earlier slated at ₹ 50,000 crore. It will be the second longest expressway in India, after the Delhi–Mumbai Expressway.

== History ==
To facilitate socio-economic development, economic growth and trade in India by ensuring faster and better transportation of goods from northern to southern India, the Ministry of Road Transport and Highways (MoRTH) planned to build a highway from Surat to Chennai, in 2021, which will help to improve connectivity, industrial activities and trade by creating a direct link, and develop the regions of Andhra Pradesh, Telangana and central Maharashtra, which at present lack them altogether as compared to other industrial regions in the country. This will also help to transport goods directly from the national capital to South India via the Delhi–Mumbai Expressway and this expressway. The ministry stated that the project will be built at a cost of ₹ 50,000 crore. In January 2023, the project was approved by the Government of India and included it in the Bharatmala Pariyojana's Phase-II. It will be built at a cost of ₹ 45,000 crore (~US$5.5 billion), and the foundation stone for the project was laid by Prime Minister Narendra Modi for the construction of the expressway's Karnataka to Akkalkot section, on the same month. The expressway is expected to be completed by December 2026.

== Route ==
The expressway will start from Nashik in Maharashtra, pass through five states, districts and their states, and terminate at Chennai, Tamil Nadu.

=== Maharashtra ===
- Nashik, Nashik district
- Ahilyanagar, Ahilyanagar district
- Beed, Beed district
- Dharashiv, Dharashiv district
- Solapur, Solapur district

=== Karnataka ===
- Kalaburagi, Kalaburagi district
- Yadgir district
- Raichur district

=== Telangana ===
- Gadwal district

=== Andhra Pradesh ===
- Kurnool, Kurnool district
- Kadapa, Kadapa district
- Rajampet ,Annamayya district
- Tirupati, Tirupati district

=== Tamil Nadu ===
- Tiruvallur district
- Chennai, Chennai district (terminating point)

== Construction ==
The expressway has been divided into two sections based on the region's topography–Greenfield and Brownfield, as well as economic corridors. The expressway will be built using the Hybrid Annuity Model (HAM) of construction. The two sections are described in the following:

=== Nashik–Solapur Economic Corridor ===
The Nashik–Ahilyanagar–Solapur Economic Corridor is the first part and the northern section of the expressway, which will be fully greenfield, six-lane and access-controlled. It will pass throughMaharashtra starting from Nashik in Maharashtra, as the expressway's starting point, and will cover the cities of Nashik, Ahilyanagar and Solapur, until the Maharashtra-Karnataka border. It will be 513 km (319 mi) in length, out of which the Surat–Ahilyanagar section will cover 288 km (179 mi) and the Ahilyanagar–Solapur–Akkalkot until the Maharashtra-Karnataka border section will cover 225 km (140 mi). This section's Detailed Project Report (DPR) has been completed by the Hyderabad-based joint venture firm, Aarvee Associates–Nag Infrastructure Engineers and Consultant JV. This section will be built at a cost of ₹ 30,000 crore. Currently, this section is under bidding, design preparation and land acquisition. It has been divided into 14 packages, which are described in the following table:

Packages	Chainages (Note: Distances from the origin of the expressway, i.e., Surat.)	Contractor	Status
Package-1	TBD	TBD	Pending notice
Package-2	TBD	TBD	Pending notice
Package-3	TBD	TBD	Pending notice
Package-4	Ambegaon (107.000 km) to Chehedi Khurd (146.000 km), Nashik district	TBA	Bidding process underway
Package-5	Chehedi Khurdh (146.000 km) to Kahandalwadi (190.560 km), Nashik district	TBA	Bidding process underway
Package-6	TBD	TBD	Pending notice
Package-7	TBD	TBD	Pending notice
Package-8	TBD	TBD	Pending notice
Package-9	TBD	TBD	Pending notice
Package-10	TBD	TBD	Pending notice
Package-11	TBD	TBD	Pending notice
Package-12	TBD	TBD	Pending notice
Package-13	TBD	TBD	Pending notice
Package-14	Hasapur (Solapur district)(512.000 km) to Badadal (Maharashtra-Karnataka border) (548.400 km)	G. R. Infraprojects Ltd.	Land acquisition underway

=== Solapur-Chennai Economic Corridor ===
The Solapur–Kurnool–Chennai Economic Corridor is the second part and the southern section of the expressway, which will be a mix of greenfield and brownfield sections, six/four-lane (Note: The second half of Andhra Pradesh until Chennai will have four lanes as part of the expressway, by widening some existing two-lane highways.) and access-controlled. The alignment of this part also lies mostly on the existing National Highway 150C (NH-150C). It will pass through five states–Maharashtra, Karnataka, Telangana, Andhra Pradesh and Tamil Nadu. It will be 707 km (439 mi) in length, out of which the greenfield section from Akkalkot to Kurnool will cover 230 km (140 mi), while the remaining 477 km (296 mi) from Kurnool to Chennai, where it will terminate, will be the brownfield section. This section's Detailed Project Report (DPR) is underway, and will be built at a cost of ₹ 15,000 crore. Currently, this entire section is under bidding, DPR preparation and land acquisition, except the Karnataka section, for which the construction has been started on the Akkalkot–Yadgir section, since January 2023, into two sections (or packages), one with a length of 71 km (44 mi), which is being built by PNC Infratech, and another with a length of 65.5 km (40.7 mi), which is being built by Dilip Buildcon Limited. Due to this, these two sections of the expressway will be completed one year before the scheduled deadline of December 2026, i.e., in December 2025. It has been divided into 8 packages, which are described in the following table:

==== Maharashtra ====
Packages	Chainages (Note: Distances from the starting point of the second half of the expressway, i.e., Akkalkot.)	Contractor	Status
Package-1	Akkalkot to Maharashtra-Karnataka Border at Badadal (0.000 km to 26.000 km)	TBD	Pending notice

==== Karnataka ====
Packages	Chainages	Contractor	Status
Package-1	Maharashtra-Karnataka Border at Badadal to Maradgi, Andola, (Kalaburagi district) (26.000 km to 97.000 km)	PNC Infratech Pvt. Ltd.	Under construction
Package-2	Maradgi, Andola to Baswantpur, Raichur district (97.000 to km 162.500 km)	Dilip Buildcon Ltd.	Under construction
Package-3	Baswantpur to Singnodi (162.500 km to 203.100 km), Raichur district	Monte Carlo Ltd.	Under construction

==== Telangana ====
Packages	Chainages	Contractor	Status
Package-1	Karnataka-Telangana border at Raichur-Gadwal road to Julekal (Mahabubnagar district) (202.900 km to 242.200 km)	Megha Engineering & Infrastructure Limited (MEIL)	Under construction
Package-2	Julekal to Kurnool, terminating on National Highway 40 (NH-40) (242.200 km to 280.400 km)	Megha Engineering & Infrastructure Limited (MEIL)	Under construction

==== Andhra Pradesh ====
Packages	Chainages	Contractor	Status
Package-1	4-laning of NH-716 from Kadapa to Chinna Orampadu (from 260.652 km to 196.125 km of NH-716)	Laxmi Infrastructure Limited	Land acquisition underway
Package-2	4-laning of NH-716 from Chinna Orampadu (designed: 64.200 km /existing: 196.125 km of NH-716) to Renigunta on NH-565 near Tirupati Airport (designed: 121.935 km/existing: 137.000 km of NH-565)	Laxmi Infrastructure Limited	Land acquisition underway

The bidding process for the remaining stretch until Chennai is underway, as of February 2023.

== Benefits ==
The expressway will benefit the entire country, as follows:

- Trade: As the expressway will connect North and South India, it will result in a high increase in transportation of goods and people, thus resulting in growth in exports, reducing dependency on imports, as well as industrial activities and accelerating economic development.
- Tourism: It will facilitate tourism by promoting it in western parts of Andhra Pradesh, Karnataka, central Maharashtra and along the Western Ghats, well known for its environment, thus resulting in the development of local economies.
- Connectivity: The expressway will create a direct connection between North and South India, resulting in faster, safer and better commute, by avoiding the existing congested routes via Bengaluru, Hyderabad, Pune and Mumbai, as well as reducing travel time and distance considerably, from around 35 hours to around 16 hours, and from approx. 1,570 km to 1,271 km.
- Protection of the environment: To ensure the protection of green cover, trees and plants will be planted along and between the route of the expressway.
- Employment: Due to increase in industrial activities along the expressway's route, various agricultural and industrial initiatives will help the states' as well as the nation economy and growth. The establishment of these numerous centres will result in multiple job possibilities for thousands of people living in both the states, and will result in immense socio-economic development.

== Environmental concerns ==
In July 2022, in a meeting of the Expert Appraisal Committee (EAC) of the Ministry of Environment, Forests and Climate Change (MoEFCC), the EAC raised concerns on the alignment of the northern part of the expressway from Surat to Ahilyanagar, through the Western Ghats region, which is ecologically sensitive, and the project could result in a serious harm to the region's environment due to deforestation and soil erosion, as well as pollution. So, the EAC recommended the Ministry of Road Transport and Highways (MoRTH) to change the expressway's alignment by avoiding the Ghats section. However, the MoRTH and the National Highways Authority of India (NHAI) gave an appeal to the EAC to negotiate the issue and requested to give way to the project, as the design preparation, packages and their bidding process and the Detailed Project Report (DPR) of the entire northern section of the expressway, including the Ghats section, are underway, and if changed the alignment, it may reduce the impact and benefits of the expressway on the places through which it will pass. The NHAI said that the construction procedure will be using modern and sustainable methods in that section to minimize any environmental damage, as much as possible.

== Status updates ==
- March 2021: The plan of the expressway was announced by the Ministry of Road Transport and Highways to the Government of India.
- February 2022: 14 bidders participated for the Package 2 section of Telangana.
- January 2023: The foundation stone for the expressway was laid by Prime Minister, Narendra Modi, and construction started on the Akkalkot–Yadgir section of the project, in the state of Karnataka. This section, divided into two sub-sections, will be completed one year before the deadline of December 2026, i.e., in December 2025.
- December 2025: following the cancellation of the Surat-Nashik section due to land acquisition and environmental clearance difficulties. The project now originates in Nashik rather than Surat.

== See also ==
- Expressways of India
