= Kharagpur–Siliguri Economic Corridor =

Economic corridor in India

The Kharagpur–Siliguri Economic Corridor is a proposed economic corridor between Kharagpur and Siliguri city in West Bengal. The corridor stretches across the state of West Bengal and passes through the major districts and divisional cities like Bardhaman, Berhampore, Malda and Raiganj. The total length of the corridor is approximately 516 km. The corridor is mapped around the existing National Highway 12 (NH12) (which connects Bakkhali and Siliguri), National Highway 27 (NH27) and the proposed Kharagpur–Morgram Expressway.

== Background ==
Import and export of goods to Siliguri and Northeast India are handled by Haldia port. But the route from the port to Siliguri is very congested, so it takes extra time to transport goods. Corridor construction is proposed to establish easy and fast connectivity between Siliguri and Kharagpur. Construction of a Corridor is proposed to establish easy and fast connectivity between Siliguri and Kharagpur city.

== Route ==
The corridor will start from Kharagpur city in West Midnapore district, West Bengal and end at Siliguri city in Darjeeling district, West Bengal. It will pass through the cities of Bardhaman, Farakka and Malda.
