= Hindon Elevated Road =

Road in Uttar Pradesh, India

- Hindon Elevated Road in red

Route information
- Length: 10.3 km (6.4 mi)
- Existed: March 2018–present

Location
- Country: India
- State: Uttar Pradesh
- Major cities: Ghaziabad

Highway system
- Roads in India; Expressways; National; State; Asian; State Highways in Uttar Pradesh

Hindon Elevated Road is a 10.3 km long, grade separated expressway located in Ghaziabad, Uttar Pradesh. It connects Raj Nagar Extension in the city to UP Gate at the border with Delhi. The road was built at a cost of Rs. 1,147 crores. The entire stretch is built on 228 single-pier pillars. The road also connects commuters to NH-24 also known as Delhi–Meerut Expressway.

== See also ==
- Expressways in India
- Delhi Noida Direct Flyway
