= Shripat Pimpri =

Village in Maharashtra

- Village
- Interactive map of Shripat Pimpri
- Country: India
- State: Maharashtra
- District: Solapur
- Elevation: 506.209 m (1,660.79 ft)

Population
  - Total: 10,000

Languages
  - Official: Marathi
- Time zone: UTC+5:30 (IST)
- PIN: 413401
- Telephone code: +91-2184
- Vehicle registration: MH-13
- Nearest city: Barshi, Solapur
- Literacy: 80%

Shripat Pimpri is a village located in Barshi taluka of the Solapur District of the state of Maharashtra in India. The population of the village is approximately 10000. Bhoinje, Aanjangaon, Gurpoli, Korphale and Wanewadi are the nearby villages of Shripat Pimpri.

== Economy ==
The economy of the village is based mainly on agriculture, milk production. The educational system offered in the village continues to 10th year classes. Primary school including lower and upper KG is located in village while the secondary school (Lokseva Vidyalaya) is half kilometer away from the village. The completed education rate is approximately 85% (although this statistic is not recent). The students for higher education go to Barshi - the taluka (Tehsil) place. There are many notable people from village who work as primary and secondary school teachers, state police/officers, engineers, computer scientists, microbiologists, researchers, medicine doctors, pharmacists, journalists etc.

== Attractions ==
There is a famous temple of Hanuman near the bus stand of the village. There is big festival called Yatra on Chaitra Pornima (Hanuman Jayanti). The villagers are spread through Maharashtra and abroad for searching the better future. They gather for Yatra in the village. There are other temples also in the village such as Vithoba, Dattatreya, Dnyaneshwar, Mhasoba, a place for Snake worship and one masjid (Mosque) at the center of the village. Thus making the small village with a multicultural hub.

== Community ==
The villagers represent from diverse castes and communities. The Bara Balutedar system still exists in the village with the people from different servant groups follow their traditional businesses. However, globalization and very unpredictable agriculture income is making these servants either to migrate to cities or to change the professions. Many People work in different areas of Maharashtra like Barshi, Mahad, Bangalore, Goa, Gujarat, New Delhi and Pune. Various villagers are working in western world as well. This makes the village being noticed as a part of resource-poor settings in India but with great potential.

== Important members of society ==
Current Mayor (Sarpanch) of Shripat Pimpri is Balraje Patil who won 2010 elections to get back Sarpanch post to Patil Family from previous Sarpanch represented by Takbhate Family. The healthcare system is basic with one Government dispensary with a part-time doctor. Few doctors do private practice in the village. But most of the villagers rely on hospitals located in Barshi where state-of-art healthcare system is available with a cancer hospital funded by Bill & Melinda Gates Foundation and linked with Tata Memorial Centre. In Barshi, apart from Civil Hospital, numerous private clinics and Hospitals are available.

== Transportation ==
The best way to come to Shripat Pimpri is to take Maharashtra State Road Transport Corporation buses form Barshi. The buses run approximately 2 times per day although timetable is extremely variable. There are few passenger trains also available from Shendri- railway station (4-5km away from village) which connect to Central Railway zone. There are other ways of private transport to the village such as Auto rickshaws, famously called tam tam. But they are also unpredictable and mostly overcrowded.
