= Raipur–Hyderabad Expressway =

Proposed road in India

Raipur-Hyderabad Expressway

Route information
- Length: 530 km (330 mi)
- Existed: March 2025 (expected)–present

Major junctions
- From: Patan, Raipur
- To: North-East outskirt Hyderabad City

Location
- Country: India
- States: Chhattisgarh, Maharashtra & Telangana
- Major cities: Raipur, Durg, Rajnandgaon, Mohla, Gadchiroli, Ramagundam, Karimnagar, &Hyderabad

Highway system
- Roads in India; Expressways; National; State; Asian

Raipur–Hyderabad Expressway, part of Raipur–Hyderabad Economic Corridor, is a planned greenfield, access-controlled, 530-kilometre (330 mi) long, six-lane expressway through Red corridor in Chhattisgarh, Maharashtra and Telangana states of central, West-central and South-central India Raipur - Hyderabad Expressway As per the current proposal by NHAI, this expressway will reach Hyderabad from Raipur via Durg, Rajnandgaon, Gadchiroli, Gondpipri, Ramagundam and Karimnagar. In this, a 104 km long expressway is to be built inside Chhattisgarh and 77 km in Maharashtra. A total road length of 181 km will be built by connecting Chhattisgarh and Maharashtra. The remaining 338 km of road will be built in Telangana.

== See also ==
- Expressways in Chhattisgarh
- Expressways in India
