= Nagpur–Hyderabad–Bengaluru Expressway =

Proposed expressway connecting Nagpur with Hyderabad and Bengaluru

Route information
- Maintained by National Highways Authority of India (NHAI)
- Length: 1,100 km (680 mi)
- Existed: ~2030 (expected)–present

Major junctions
- From: 1. Nagpur; 2. Hyderabad
- To: 1. Hyderabad; 2. Bengaluru

Location
- Country: India
- States: Maharashtra, Telangana, Andhra Pradesh and Karnataka
- Major cities: Nagpur, Hinganghat, Pandharkawada, Adilabad, Nirmal, Nizamabad, Kamareddy, Hyderabad, Mahabubnagar, Kurnool, Gooty, Anantapur, Hindupuram, Chikkaballapur and Bengaluru

Highway system
- Roads in India; Expressways; National; State; Asian

Nagpur-Hyderabad-Bengaluru Expressway, also known as Nagpur–Bengaluru Expressway, is a proposed 1,100 km (680 mi) long, eight-lane, greenfield access-controlled expressway, which will connect the third largest city of Maharashtra, Nagpur with the capital of Karnataka, Bengaluru, through the capital of Telangana, Hyderabad. It will pass through four states–Maharashtra, Telangana, Andhra Pradesh and Karnataka. It will reduce both travel time and distance, from the current 24 hours to 12 hours, and from around 1,200 km (750 mi) to 1,100 km (680 mi). It will have two sections–one from Nagpur to Hyderabad and the other from Hyderabad to Bengaluru. It will be operated and maintained by the National Highways Authority of India (NHAI). The project will be built at a cost of ₹ 35,000 crore (US$ 4.2 billion), and is expected to be completed before 2030.

== History ==
Due to growing traffic and pressure on National Highway 44 (North-South Corridor) (NH-44), which runs from Uri in Jammu and Kashmir to Kanyakumari in Tamil Nadu, the highway will not be able to cope with the future traffic and vehicular load, despite four-laning along most of the route, especially the stretch from Nagpur to Bengaluru, due to the cities' growing population. So, the Ministry of Road Transport and Highways (MoRTH) planned to build an expressway between those two cities through Hyderabad, in 2017. It will become an alternative to NH-44, and will decongest traffic and reduce the growing pressure on it. It will help to reduce both travel time considerably, from around 23-24 hours to only 11-12 hours, and from approx. 1,200 km to 1,100 km. The expressway will have six lanes, which in the future, could be expanded to more number of lanes, by keeping space in between the lanes. In May 2018, a private firm was selected for preparing the Detailed Project Report (DPR), and still continues to be underway. The expressway, initially, was expected to be completed after 2025, by building it at a cost of ₹ 35,000 crore (US$ 4.2 billion). However, due to delays in implementation and preparations for pre-construction and construction works, the expressway has currently no scheduled deadline, as of 2023, but it is assumed to be completed by at least before 2030.

== See also ==
- Expressways of India
- National highways of India
- Mumbai–Nagpur Expressway
- Bangalore Chennai Expressway
