= Chatrapati Shivaji Maharaj Uddanpul =

Bridge in Nashik, Maharashtra, India

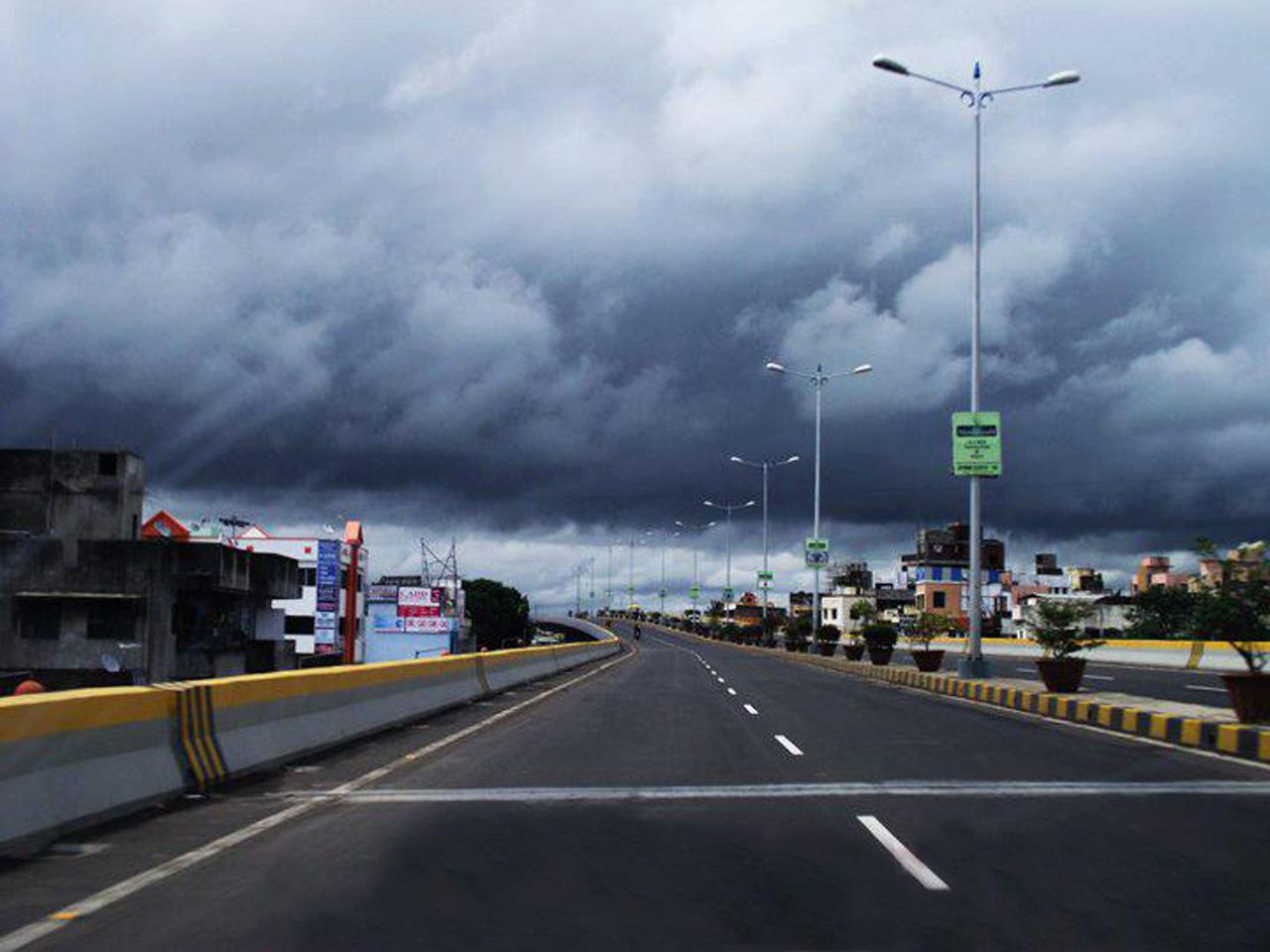
- Chatrapati Shivaji Maharaj Uddanpul
- Coordinates: 19.994014°N 73.797149°E
- Carries: 4 lanes not allowed for pedestrians, bicycles, Motor-Cycles, and Auto Rickshaws.
- Crosses: Nashik city
- Locale: Nashik
- Official name: Chatrapati Shivaji Maharaj Uddanpul
- Maintained by: Ashoka Buildcon, Larsen & Toubro, National Highways Authority of India

Characteristics
- Material: Steel
- Total length: 14 Km.
- Width: width= 120 ft.
- Height: 70 ft.
- Clearance above: 20 ft.
- Clearance below: 20 ft.

History
- Constructed by: Ashoka Buildcon and Larsen & Toubro
- Construction start: 4 January 2010
- Construction end: 10 June 2013
- Opened: 14 June 2013; 12 years ago

Statistics
- Daily traffic: 50,000 vehicles
- Toll: Free both ways in City.

Location
- Interactive map of Chatrapati Shivaji Maharaj Uddanpul

Chatrapati Shivaji Maharaj Uddanpul is in Nashik city, Dwarka area. It starts from Pandavleni caves and ends near Adgaon. It is India's first externally-strutted segmental box girder bridge. it has capacity of 100 Ton each and India's second-longest road bridge. It was approved by Atal Bihari Vajpayee in 2002.
