= Ghazipur–Ballia–Manjhi Expressway =

1. REDIRECT Draft:Ghazipur–Ballia–Manjhi Expressway
