= Hyderabad–Indore Expressway =

Expressway in India

Indore-Hyderabad Expressway

Route information
- Length: 713 km (443 mi)

Location
- Country: India

Highway system
- Roads in India; Expressways; National; State; Asian

Indore-Hyderabad Expressway is an expressway which is under-construction. It will connect Hyderabad, the capital of Telangana to Indore in Madhya Pradesh. The total length of the expressway is 713 kilometres (443 mi) and it is expected to be completed by March 2027

== Route ==
The expressway will pass through the states of Telangana, Maharashtra and Madhya Pradesh. It will provide connectivity to the following towns, cities and tourist attractions.

=== Telangana ===
- Hyderabad
- Yellareddy
- Bodhan

=== Maharashtra ===
- Degloor
- Nanded
- Kalamnuri
- Hingoli
- Washim
- Akola

=== Madhya Pradesh ===
- Burhanpur
- Barwaha
- Indore

== Status ==
- Aug 13, 2020 - Proposed
- Dec 21, 2020 - Foundation Stone laid
- Apr 30, 2022 - Hyderabad – Indore Economic Corridor: 96 Km Long Telangana Section Inaugurated By Nitin Gadkari
- Jun 09, 2024 - Package 1 and Package 2 construction is undergoing.

== See also ==
- Expressways of India
- National highways of India
- List of national highways in India
- Indian Railways
- List of airports in India
- Transport in India
