= Barshi =

- City
- Barshi
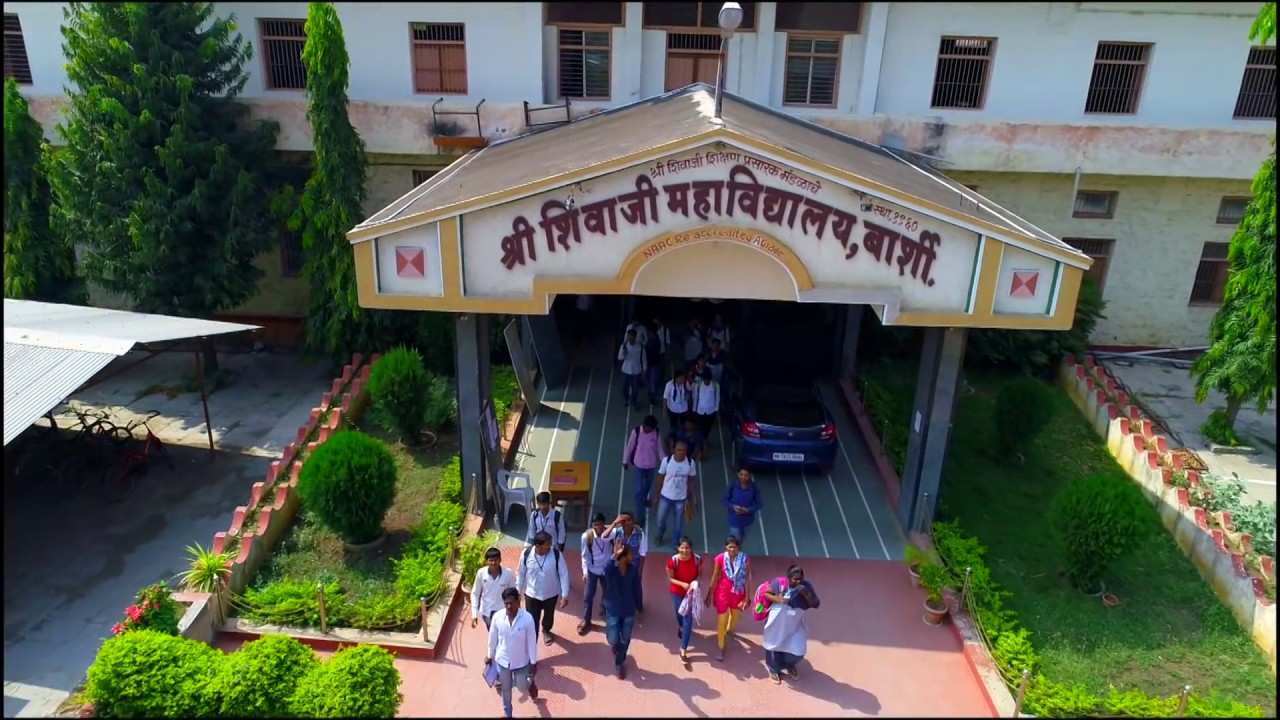
- Shree Shivaji Mahavidyalaya Barshi
- Nickname: Barsi
- Location of Barshi in Maharashtra
- Coordinates: 18°14′3″N 75°41′42″E
- Country: India
- State: Maharashtra
- District: Solapur
- Taluka: Barshi

Government
  - Type: Municipal Council

Population (2011)
  - Total: 187,000
- Demonym: Barshikar
- Time zone: IST
  - Summer (DST): 5:30
- PIN: 413401,413411
- Area code: (+91) 2184
- Vehicle registration: MH-13
- Website: http://barshimahaulb.maharashtra.gov.in/

Barshi is a town located in the Barshi Taluka of Solapur district of the state Of Maharashtra. The town has a Municipal Council.

Barshi is one of the largest city in Solapur District. It is a hub for business, industry, and tourism, with a high number of lentil industries in particular. It is known for powerloom and handloom industries.

Barshi is forthcoming as medical, educational and agricultural market center for rural masses from the nearby Marathwada region.

== Demographics ==
As of 2017 projected India census, Barshi has a population of 300000. Males constitute 51% of the population and females 49%.

Barshi has an average literacy rate of 87%, higher than the national average of 77.7%; with 56% of the males and 44% of females literate. 12% of the population is under 6 years of age. It had, as per the Census of 1971, a total population of 62,374.

== Municipality ==
The municipality was established at Barshi in 1865. It covers an area of 46 square kilometres (18 sq mi) and is now governed under the Maharashtra Municipalities Act, 1965. The municipal council is composed of thirty-three members with three seats being reserved for women and two for scheduled castes.

The municipal council has six committees: the standing committee, the public works committee, the education committee, the sanitation, medical and public health committee, the water-supply and drainage committee and the planning and development committee to look after the various aspects of municipal administration. The Chief Officer is the executive head of the municipality and is assisted by the Health Officer, the Municipal Engineer, the Octroi Superintendent, the Internal Auditor and the Chief Accountant and other ministerial staff.

For public convenience the municipality maintains two vegetable markets, one mutton market and one fish market. The open-air theatre-cum-mangal Karyalaya has been constructed at a cost of about Rs. 67,000. The municipality conducts one hospital and an ayurvedic dispensary. The veterinary dispensary is managed by the Zilla Parishad. Primary education has been made compulsory in the town and is conducted by the municipal school board. The municipality spends annually about Rs. 4,00,000 on primary education.

The underground drainage system has not been introduced in the town as yet. There are open and covered gutters and the arrangements are made by the municipal council for the removal of night-soil. Wells and the Pathari tank form the main sources of water-supply. Pumping sets have been installed on wells within the municipal area. The municipality maintains one fire-fighter. The total length of roads in the municipal limit is approximately 46 kilometres (29 mi), of which a length of about 16 kilometres (9.9 mi) is asphalted. The cremation and burial places are maintained by the municipality.

== Bhagvant Temple ==
Bhagwant temple is dedicated to Shri Vishnu. The uniqueness of this temple is that this is the only temple of Shri Vishnu all over India having Shri Vishnu’s name as "Bhagavant".

The temple was built in 1245 A.D. in Hemadpanthi style. There are four entries to the temple from all the four directions, but the main entry is east-facing.

There is one GARUDKHAMB in front of Garbhagraha. The idol of main deity Shri Bhagvant is in black stone having SHANKH, CHAKRA and GADA is in the hands and picture of devotee king Ambrish below the right hand. Shri Laxmi is on the back of Bhagvant idol. Shivlinga is there on the forehead and marks of Footsteps of Bhrigu Rishi on the chest of the deity.

There are old records showing the grants released by Shri Nanasaheb Peshve in the year 1760, by East India Company in 1823 and by British Government in 1784.

The temple management is looked after by a Panch Committee. Badves carry out the work of daily rituals of the temple. The daily rituals include Kakada Arti, Nitya Puja, Mahapuja in the morning, Dhuparti in the evening and Shejarti in the night.

A large number of devotees visit during the Chaitri, Maghi, Aashadi & kartiki (Hindu Months) Ekadashi.

During the Aashadi & Kartiki Ekadashi a large procession is taken out covering the town with Bhagvant riding on Garuda. A CHABINA is taken out on every full moon day.

Every morning at five Lord Bhagawanta is woken up with the Kakad arati adorations to the accompaniment of the sound of the cymbals. Several devotees, both men and women, attend these morning devotions. They bring the offerings of sugar, fruits, milk, curds and butter. The traditional honour of the Kakad of Bhagawant Mandir is with Sri Dattatreya Krishnath Patil. The priest is particular about continuing this convention. It was Sri Bhaurao Tatya Patil who took up the onus of Bhagawant Kakad way back, a tradition that has been passed down the generations.

At the time of Kakad arati, the Lord is first adored with ghee lamps and then the priest changes the cloak and offerings of fruits and sugar are made. The lotus feet of the Lord are washed with warm water. Incense is waved, milk offered in silver vessels and then a panch-aarati performed. After this Sri Ganapati and Varun are worshipped with blowing of conch. The priest puts a blob of butter in Lord’s mouth. Then He is anointed with milk, curds, ghee, sugar and honey. Lord Bhagawanta is given a bath with water showered out of His silver pail. This water is considered equal in merit to Bhagirathi and sprinkled upon the devotees assembled. After this follows the karpur arati and hymns and praises are sung by the devotees. After the Lord has bathed and put on new clothes, He is given an offering of khichadi. This is being taken care of by the local business community— Sri Nanasaheb Budukh and Sri Balasaheb Kokate are looking at this aspect presently.

In the afternoon, the Brahmins of town, Deshpande, Budukh, Joshi, Patil, Deshmukh, Mangire etc. provide the naivedya/repast for Lord Bhagawanta. The priests bring this from the homes of the respective families. Many are the offerings made on occasions such as Gudi Padva, Dasera, Diwali etc.

== Educational institutes ==
The city is well known in the region for its educational institutions and nearby districts and tehsils depends upon these educational facilities:

Major High Schools

- Silver Jubilee High School, Barshi
- Barshi Technical High School
- Sojar English Medium School, Barshi
- MIT Pune's Smt. Prayag Karad Vishwashanti English Medium High School, Barshi
- Sheth Agarchand Kunkulol High School, Barshi
- Maharashtra Vidyalaya, Barshi
- Sulakhe English Medium School, Barshi
- Anglo-Urdu High School, Barshi
- Adarsh Highschool, Shendri
- Model High School, Barshi
- Sulakhe High school, Barshi
- New Highschool, Kuslamb
- Z.P. School, Dhanore (Every Village Have ZP Schools)
- Nagnath Highschool, Ghari

Junior and Senior Colleges

- MAEER's MIT Pune's MIT Junior College, Barshi (Science & Commerce with Integrated Approach)
- Shree Shivaji Mahavidyalaya (Shri Shivaji Sikshan Prasarak Manadal - founded by Karmaveer Mamasaheb Jagdale)
- Shriman Bhausaheb Zadbuke College
- B.P. Sulakhe Commerce College - SSSPM's Polytechnic, Barshi - Karmveer Institute of Information Technology(K.I.I.T.)
- Sulakhe junior science college, Barshi

These institutions serves the higher educational needs of the town as well as surrounding region. Sarvodaya Shikshan Prasarak Mandal, Chare is one of the educational institute run Schools and colleges in Barshi Taluka. The Junior College of education (Adhyapak Vidyalaya, Chare) Chare is one of oldest D. Ed. colleges founded by Mr Sambhajirao Jagdale and Late Shree Madhukar Kisan More (sir).

There are also various institutions providing competitive professional education such as BA, B.Com, BSC, BCA, BCS, B.P.Ed, M.P.Ed, M.Sc, Agri, Engg, Diploma, ATD, Pharmacy, ITI, etc.

Recently educationalist Dr. Vishwanath Karad announced his plans to establish state of the art Medical institution in the city. ( at the place of old textile mill - Lokmanya Mills) & also establish india's first private engineering college dedicated to Railway Sector from 2017-18.

Technical Education:

- MAEER's MIT College of Railway Engineering & Research, Barshi [India's firsts private engineering college dedicated to Railway Sector] [DTE Code - EN 6901]
- BIT Engineering college, Barshi.
- S.S.S.P.M. Polytechnic, Barshi provides Diploma courses in the stream of Industrial Electronics, Civil and Computer sciences.

This is one of the few institutes offering diploma course in Industrial Electronics department.

At the place of KIIT which becomes now School of Nursing which gives diploma in nursing.

- Tushar Polytechnic, Vairag.
- S.B.Z. Institute of Polytechnic, Puri.

== Healthcare facility ==
BARSHI is known as Medical Hub. It has many hospitals with round the clock facilities. Jagdale Mama Hospital is the biggest hospital in Barshi. Shree Bhagwant Superspeciality Hospital in Barshi. Nurgis Dutt Cancer Hospital is one of the hospitals with a multidisciplinary approach.

== Transport ==
Barshi is situated at East Dharashiv, Latur, Tuljapur, Paranda, kallamb At West-Pandharpur, Madha, Pune. At North-Bhoom, Beed, Ahmednagar. At South-Solapur, Akkalkot, Dudhani.

Barshi is connected with the NH65 and NH52 by NH63 and NH548C. At west NH65 and East NH52. NH65 is 60 km away at Tembhurni, Solapur District Itself. NH52 Is 30 km away at Yermala Cross, Osmanabad District as its neighbor district.

The National Highway 63 and NH548C which goes through Barshi city will be upgraded to a 4 lane highway.

== Barsi Town (BTW) Railway Station ==
Barshi is connected by railways with Mumbai, Pune, Hyderabad, Nagpur, Kurduvadi Junction, Kolhapur, Sangli, Baramati, Pandharpur, Bidar, Nanded, Latur.

== See also ==
- Bhonsale
- Maratha
- Maratha Empire
- List of Maratha dynasties and states
- Shripat Pimpri
- Gormale
