= National Highways Authority of India =

Agency for construction & management of Highways in India

National Highways Authority of India (NHAI)
- NHAI Logo

- India National Highways Map
- Abbreviation: NHAI
- Formation: 1995; 31 years ago (Act 1988)
- Type: Government Agency
- Legal status: Active
- Headquarters: Sector-10, Dwarka, Delhi
- Region served: India
- Official language: English and Hindi
- Chairman: Santosh Kumar Yadav (IAS)
- Member (Admin): Vishal Chauhan (IAS)
- Member (Finance): N.R.V.V.M.K. Rajendra Kumar
- Member (Projects): Anil Choudhary
- Main organ: Board of directors
- Parent organisation: Ministry of Road Transport and Highways, Government of India
- Budget: ₹162,207 crore (US$17 billion) (2023–24 est.)
- Website: nhai.gov.in

Rationalization of Numbering Systems of National Highway of India

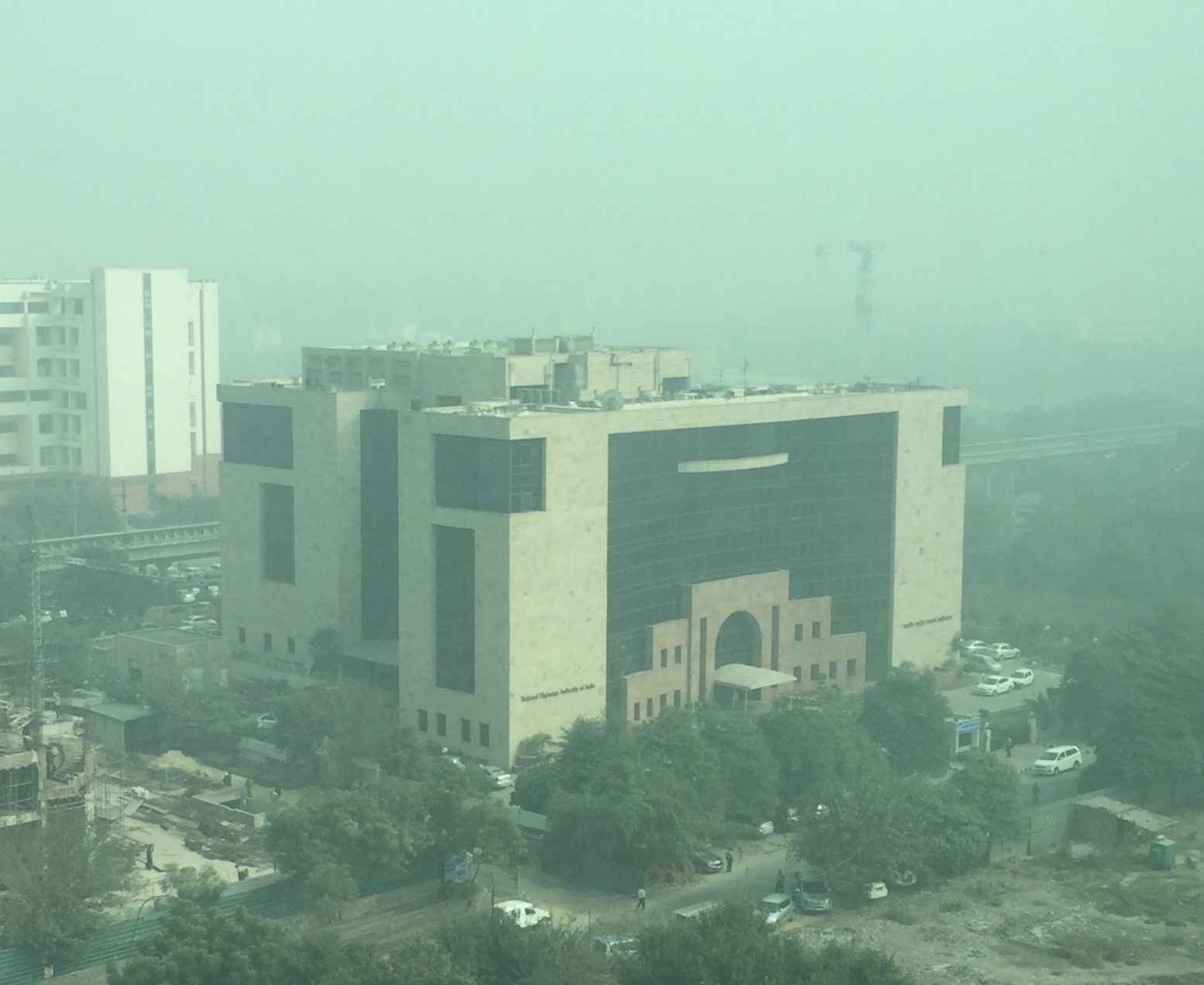
Headquarters of the NHAI at Sector 10, Dwarka in New Delhi, India.

The National Highways Authority of India (NHAI) is an autonomous agency of the Government of India, set up in 1995 (Act 1988) and is responsible for management of a road network of over 50,000 km of National highways out of 1,32,499 km in India. It is a nodal agency of the Ministry of Road Transport and Highways (MoRTH). NHAI has signed a memorandum of understanding (MoU) with the Indian Space Research Organisation (ISRO) for satellite mapping of highways.

== History ==
The National Highways Authority of India (NHAI) was created through the promulgation of the National Highways Authority of India Act, 1988. Section 16(1) of the Act states that the function of NHAI is to develop, maintain and manage the national highways and any other highways vested in, or entrusted to, it by the Government of India. On 10 February 1995, NHAI came into operations and was formally made an autonomous body. It is responsible for the development, maintenance and management of National Highways, totalling over 92,851.05 km (57,694.97 mi) in length. The NHAI is also responsible of the toll collection on several highways. Yogendra Narain was the first Chairman of NHAI in 1988. He is a retired IAS officer of Uttar Pradesh cadre. In June 2022, the NHAI created a Guinness World record by building 75 km of highway between Amravati and Akola in Maharashtra in a span of just 5 days.

== Projects ==
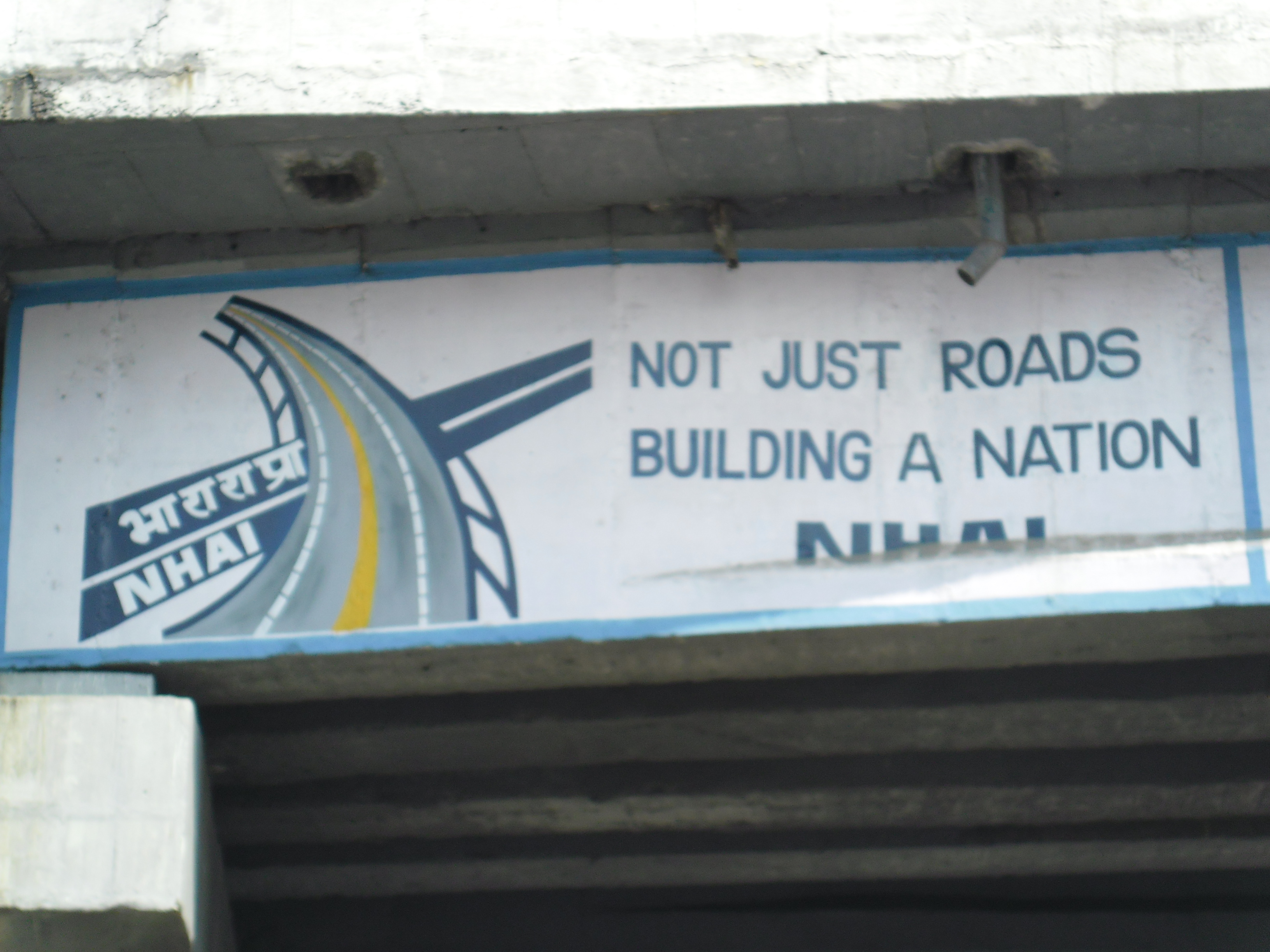
NHAI logo and caption

The NHAI has the mandate to implement the National Highways Development Project (NHDP). The NHDP is under implementation in Phases.

- Phase I: Approved in December 2000, at an estimated cost of ₹300 billion, it included the Golden Quadrilateral (GQ), portions of the North–South and East–West Corridor, and connectivity of major ports to National highways.
- Phase II: Approved in December 2003, at an estimated cost of ₹343 billion, it included the completion of the NS-EW corridors and another 486 km (302 mi) of highways.
- Phase IIIA: This phase was approved in March 2005, at an estimated cost of ₹222 billion, it includes an upgrade to 4-lanes of 4,035 km (2,507 mi)of National Highways.
- Phase IIIB: This was approved in April 2006, at an estimated cost of ₹543 billion, it includes an upgrade to 4-lanes of 8,074 km (5,017 mi) of National Highways.
- Phase V: Approved in October 2006, it includes upgrades to 6-lanes for 6,500 km (4,000 mi), of which 5,700 km (3,500 mi) is on the GQ. This phase is entirely on a DBFO basis.
- Phase VI: This phase, approved in November 2006, will develop 1,000 km (620 mi) of expressways at an estimated cost of ₹ 167 billion.
- Phase VII: This phase, approved in December 2007 will develop ring-roads, bypasses and flyovers to avoid traffic bottlenecks on selected stretches at a cost of ₹167 billion.

NHAI along with NHIDCL helps in implementing Special Accelerated Road Development Programme for North Eastern Region (SARDP-NE); a project to upgrade National Highways connecting state capitals to 2 lanes or 4 lanes in the north-eastern region.

=== Golden Quadrilateral ===
The Golden Quadrilateral is a highway network connecting many of the major industrial, agricultural and cultural centres of India. A quadrilateral of sorts is formed by connecting Chennai, Kolkata, Delhi and Mumbai, and hence its name. The largest highway project in India and the fifth longest in the world was launched in 2001 by Prime Minister of India, Atal Bihari Vajpayee and was completed in 2012. It is part of the first phase of the National Highways Development Project (NHDP) and consisted of building 5,846 km (3,633 mi) four/six lane express highways at a cost of ₹600 billion (US$6.2 billion).

=== North–South and East–West Corridor ===
The North–South and East–West Corridor is part of the second phase of the National Highways Development Project (NHDP) and consists of building 7,142 kilometres (4,438 mi) of four/six lane expressways connecting Srinagar in the north and Kanyakumari and Kochi in the south, Porbandar in the west and Silchar in the east, at a cost of US$12.317 billion (at 1999 prices).

=== National-Green-Highway-Mission ===
The Ministry of Road Transport and Highways (MoRTH), Government of India has promulgated Green Highways (Plantations, Transplantations, Beautification, and Maintenance) Policy – 2015 on 29 September 2015 to develop green corridors along National Highways for sustainable environment and inclusive growth. The policy envisions "development of eco-friendly National Highways with the participation of the communities, farmers, NGOs, private sector, institutions, government agencies and the Forest Departments for economic growth and development in a sustainable manner."

Under the aegis of the Policy, development of green corridors is proposed along developed and upcoming National Highways in the width available in existing Right of Way (ROW) in the form of median and avenue plantations.

Green Highways Division - under NHAI has been entrusted with the task of planning, implementation and monitoring roadside plantations along a network of National Highways. For effective project planning, implementation and monitoring GHD has developed a Guidelines and Vision Document.

== Criticism ==
A 2012 report prepared by the World Bank's Institutional Integrity Unit alleged that fraudulent and corrupt practices were being followed by Indian contractors working on national highway projects funded by it, and sought a thorough investigation into the matter. The report also alleged that contractors paid bribes and gifts, including gold coins, to "influence the actions" of officials and consultants of the National Highways Authority of India.

Local bodies and major road owners - including PWD and National Highways Authority of India (NHAI) - were criticized for depending on old technologies and outdated specifications for building and relaying roads.

== New numbering system ==
In March 2010, Government of India issued a new list of numbered routes with rationalized and systematic numbering. The east–west oriented highways are numbered odd starting from North and increasing towards South e.g., NH 1, NH 3, NH 27 etc. The even numbered routes are, similarly, drawn vertically going north to south, with numbers increasing from eastern to western parts of India e.g., NH 2, NH 6, NH 44 etc.

== Initiatives ==
=== National Green Highways Program ===
The Ministry of Road Transport and Highways and NHAI launched the green highways program in 2016.

=== Harit Path application ===
The National Highways authority of India launched "Harit Path", a mobile application to monitor plantations along National Highways. It will also monitor species detail, target achievements and maintenance activities.

== See also ==
- List of national highways in India
- National Highways and Infrastructure Development Corporation Limited
- Expressways of India
- Inland Waterways Authority of India
- Transport in India
- FASTag
