= New Koilwar Bridge =

1.52 Km bridge over Sone river in Bihar, India

- Coordinates: 25°34′10″N 84°48′05″E
- Carries: Arrah-Patna (NH-922) (old NH-30)
- Crosses: Sone river
- Locale: Koilwar, Bhojpur, Bihar
- Official name: Vashishtha Narayan Setu
- Maintained by: National Highways Authority of India (NHAI)

Characteristics
- Total length: 1,528 metres (5,013 ft)
- Width: 16 metres (52 ft)
- No. of spans: 74
- No. of lanes: 6

History
- Constructed by: SP Singla Constructions Pvt. Ltd.
- Construction start: January 2018
- Construction end: 14 May 2022 (all 6-lanes)
- Opened: 10 December 2020 (3-lanes)

New Koilwar Bridge, (officially Vashishtha Narayan Setu) at Koilwar in Bhojpur is a 1.52 km long, 6-lane wide road bridge over the Sone river. It connects Arrah with Patna, the capital of Bihar state in India and also carries Buxar-Arrah-Patna national highway (NH-922). New Koilwar Bridge is named after Indian mathematician and Padma Shri awardee Vashishtha Narayan Singh (1946–2019). New Koilwar Bridge is 500 metres north and parallel to the existing 2-lane wide Koilwar Bridge. The construction work of all 6-lanes completed and Bridge is fully opened to public on 14 May 2022.

In December 2020, Government of India has approved a 4-lane wide elevated road from Bharauli near Buxar of Bihar to Haydaria in Ghazipur of Uttar Pradesh. Upon its completion, Patna will be connected with Lucknow via New Koilwar bridge, Buxar-Ghazipur elevated road and the Purvanchal Expressway.

== History ==
The Koilwar Bridge, a 2-lane wide road-cum-rail bridge was built by East Indian Railway Company and became operational on 4 November 1862. Since it was narrow and getting older there was a huge traffic movement problem, there was a need for an alternate road bridge to solve this issue. After 158 years, on 10 December 2020 Nitin Gadkari the Union Minister of Road Transport and Highways inaugurated the New Koilwar Bridge via video-conferencing from New Delhi.

== Delhi-Patna connectivity ==
The 6-lane New Koilwar Bridge is a part of Government of India's initiative to connect New Delhi with Patna (via Lucknow) in order to improve transportation facilities and trade & commerce activities in the state of Bihar. New Delhi is already connected to Ghazipur in Uttar Pradesh by various expressways and upon the completion of 'Buxar-Ghazipur elevated road', people can travel till Patna in Bihar by Buxar-Arrah-Patna national highway (NH-922).

=== Road network ===
List of expressways and highways connecting New Delhi with Agra, Lucknow and Patna.

Sr. No.	Name of Road	from	to	Distance in km
1	DND Flyway	New Delhi	Noida	6.0
2	Noida–Greater Noida Expressway	Noida	Greater Noida	24.5
3	Yamuna Expressway	Greater Noida	Agra	165.5
4	Agra–Lucknow Expressway	Agra	Lucknow	302.2
5	Lucknow Ring Road	Sarosa Bharosa	Chand Saray	32
6	Purvanchal Expressway	Lucknow	Ghazipur	340.8
7	Ghazipur–Buxar Elevated Road	Ghazipur	Buxar	17.0
8	Buxar–Arrah–Patna (NH-922)	Buxar	Patna	125.0

Note: Union Minister Nitin Gadkari announced on 28 August 2021 that the Government of India will construct Ghazipur–Arrah–Patna Expressway at an event in Arrah, Bihar.

== Status updates ==
- July 2017: Foundation stone ceremony of New Koilwar Bridge done by Union Minister R. K. Singh on 22 July 2017.
- Jan 2018: The construction work of Bridge started by SP Singla Constructions Pvt Ltd.
- Dec 2020: 3-lanes (Patna to Arrah) opened for traffic to public and inaugurated on 10 December 2020 by Union Minister Nitin Gadkari.
- May 2022: The other 3-lanes (Arrah to Patna) opened to public on 14 May 2022. Inauguration done by Union Minister Nitin Gadkari.

== See also ==
- Koilwar Bridge
- Arrah-Chhapra Bridge
