= Gorakhpur Link Expressway =

Indian expressway connecting Gorakhpur and Azamgarh

- Gorakhpur Link Expressway in red

Route information
- Maintained by Uttar Pradesh Expressways Industrial Development Authority (UPEIDA)
- Length: 91.352 km (56.764 mi)
- Existed: 20 June 2025–present

Major junctions
- North end: Jaitpur village, Gorakhpur district
- South end: Salarpur village, Azamgarh district

Location
- Country: India
- State: Uttar Pradesh

Highway system
- Roads in India; Expressways; National; State; Asian; State Highways in Uttar Pradesh

Gorakhpur Link Expressway is a 91 km (57 mi) long, 4-lane wide (expandable to 6) expressway in the Indian state of Uttar Pradesh. It connects Jaitpur village on NH-27 in Gorakhpur district with Salarpur village on Purvanchal Expressway in Azamgarh district. Salarpur interchange is located at chainage 190+855 km of Purvanchal Expressway.

It was launched in 2018 by Chief Minister Yogi Adityanath and land acquisition was started in February 2019 by the Government of Uttar Pradesh. The total project value of Gorakhpur Link Expressway, including the land acquisition cost is around ₹ 5,876 crores.

== Route ==
The Gorakhpur Link Expressway connects Jaitpur village on Gorakhpur Bypass in Gorakhpur district with Salarpur village (south of Jalalpur) on Purvanchal Expressway in Azamgarh district. It passes through 4 districts of Uttar Pradesh i.e. Gorakhpur, Sant Kabir Nagar, Ambedkar Nagar and Azamgarh.

== Toll/Cut ==
The Gorakhpur Link Expressway Have List Of Toll/Cut

- Katka/Smanpur Cut
- Atroliya/Tanda Cut
- Rajesultanpur/Tanda Cut
- Belghat Cut
- Sikariganj/Gola Cut
- Kajni/Unwal Cut

== Construction ==
The construction cost (excluding the cost of Land) is around ₹3,024 crores. Around 1,095 hectares (2,710 acres) of land will be acquired for this project. 2 Toll Plaza, 3 ramp plaza, 7 Flyovers, 7 major bridges, 27 minor bridges, 16 vehicular-underpasses (VUP), 50 Light VUP and 35 pedestrian underpasses will also be constructed.

The construction work of the 91.352 km long Gorakhpur Link Expressway is divided into 2 packages:

Sr. No	Package	Length in km	Contractor
1.	Jaitpur (Gorakhpur)–Fulwariya (Ambedkar Nagar)	48.317	Apco Infratech
2.	Fulwariya (Ambedkar Nagar)–Salarpur (Azamgarh)	43.035	Dilip Buildcon Limited

== Status updates ==
- Feb 2019: Land acquisition work started by Government of Uttar Pradesh.
- Oct 2019: 50% of the required land has been acquired. Construction work is divided in 2 packages.
- Nov 2019: Dilip Buildcon Ltd receives Letter of Acceptance (LoA) for Package-2 on 29 November 2019.
- Feb 2020: Construction work started on 10 February for Package-1 by Apco Infratech.
- Apr 2020: Road construction work resumed.
- Jun 2020: Construction work started on 19 June for Package-2 by Dilip Buildcon.
- Mar 2021: 1,044 out of 1,095 Hectares (95.36%) of required land has been acquired till 30 March.
- Jun 2021: 24% of construction work and 50% of earthwork is completed as of 28 June.
- Jan 2022: 50% of the earthwork and 34% of construction work has been completed.
- Aug 2022: 75% of earthwork and 52% of overall construction work has been completed. 289 structures out of 342 have been completed.
- Mar 2023: 62% of overall construction work has been completed, 319 structures out of 342 have been completed. and is now confirmed to become operational by December 2023.
- May 2024: 100% of earthwork and 95% of overall Construction work has been completed, 337 structures out of 341 have been completed.
- Jan 2025: 100% of earthwork and 98% of overall Construction work has been completed, 337 structures out of 341 have been completed.
- Jun 2025 Inaugurated by Yogi Adityanath and traffic opened to public on 20 June 2025.

== See also ==
- Purvanchal Expressway
- Agra-Lucknow Expressway
- Bundelkhand Expressway
- Lucknow–Kanpur Expressway
- Ganga Expressway
- Udyog Path
- Kisan Path
