= Uttar Pradesh Expressways Industrial Development Authority =

Indian agency controlled by Government of Uttar Pradesh

- UPEIDA Logo
- Type: Industrial Area Development Authority
- Industry: Construction
- Founded: 27 December 2007; 18 years ago
- Headquarters: C-13, 2nd Floor, PARYATAN Bhawan, Vipin Khand, Gomti Nagar, Lucknow - 226010, Lucknow, India
- Area served: Construction, operations and maintenance of Expressways built by the Government of Uttar Pradesh
- Key people: Nand Gopal Gupta (Cabinet Minister of Industrial Development); Jaswant Singh Saini (Minister of State); Deepak Kumar (Chief Executive Officer); Sanjay Singh (Chief Financial Officer); Pawan Verma (Chief Engineer)
- Website: UPEIDA

The Uttar Pradesh Expressways Industrial Development Authority (UPEIDA), headquartered at Paryatan Bhawan in Gomti Nagar in Lucknow, is a nodal agency of the Government of Uttar Pradesh responsible for the land acquisition, construction, operation & maintenance of the expressway, industrial corridors, and the promotion of investments in the state of Uttar Pradesh.

== About ==
The Government of Uttar Pradesh has set up an Authority named "Uttar Pradesh Expressways Industrial Development Authority" (UPEIDA), under UP Industrial Area Development Act 1976, vide Notification Number 4246/77-4-07-94 Bha/07TC, dated 27 December 2007 issued by Industrial Area Development Department-4, Government of Uttar Pradesh.

== Projects of UPEIDA ==
=== Operational Projects ===
- Agra-Lucknow Expressway
- Purvanchal Expressway (Lucknow to Ghazipur)
- Bundelkhand Expressway (Etawah to Chitrakoot)
- Gorakhpur Link Expressway
- Ganga Expressway (Meerut to Prayagraj)

=== Ongoing Projects ===
- Uttar Pradesh Defence Industrial Corridor (UPDIC)
- Integrated Manufacturing and Logistic Cluster (IMLC)

=== Upcoming Projects ===
- Chitrakoot Link Expressway
- Link Expressway from Agra-Lucknow Expressway to Purvanchal Expressway
- Link Expressway from Agra-Lucknow Expressway to Ganga Expressway
- Link Expressway from Jewar Airport to Ganga Expressway
- Jhansi Link Expressway
- Meerut-Haridwar Expressway
- Vindhya Expressway
- Vindhya-Purvanchal Expressway Spur

== Functions of UPEIDA ==
- Planning and developing state expressway projects of Government of UP.
- Land acquisition and coordination with district administrations.
- Appointing consultants, contractors and concessionaires.
- Monitoring construction quality, project progress and costs.
- Arranging toll collection and operation and maintenance.
- Developing industrial and logistics facilities along expressway corridors.
- Facilitating defence manufacturing under the Uttar Pradesh Defence Industrial Corridor.

== Expressways in Uttar Pradesh ==
List of expressways in Uttar Pradesh, listed north to south, west to east.

=== A. West to east across the state: approved. ===
==== A1. Across Northern Uttar Pradesh: Ludhiana–Bareilly-Gorakhpur–Siliguri direct route, approved. ====
This includes "Bareilly-Ludhiana Economic Corridor".

- Ludhiana–Rupnagar Expressway (Ludhiana–Chandigarh Expressway), 91 km, 4-lane (expendable to 6), INR2792 cr, greenfield, from Manewal village on the Delhi–Amritsar Expressway to Bheora village near Rupnagar (Ropar) & a 19.5 km spur to Kharar, by NHAI, under-construction (March 2024 completion).
- Ambala–Chandigarh Expressway, 35 km, 4-lane, operational.
- Ambala-Shamli Expressway, 121.78 km, greenfield, Ambala (Sadopur) to Shamli (Gogwan Jalalpur), under construction (March 2025 completion).

- Panipat-Bareilly-Gorakhpur Expressway, 700–800 km, greenfield, 6-lane extendable t0 8 lanes, access-controlled, construction will commence in March 2026 after completion of DPR and land acquisition (Nov 2025 update).<ref=intdt1>Gorakhpur–Panipat Expressway: 6 Lanes, 700 km long…, UP’s longest expressway to pass through 22 districts, to directly connect UP with Delhi-NCR and Haryana, India Times, 28 Oct 2025.</ref> At Gogwan Jalalpur near Thanabhawan will connect to Ambala-Shamli Expressway and Delhi–Dehradun Expressway and also to Panipat–Dabwali Expressway near Samalkha.
  - Panipat-Shamli Expressway
  - Shamli–Bareilly Expressway, 220 km, greenfield, under-construction.
  - Bareilly–Gorakhpur Expressway, 500 km, 4-lane, greenfield, under-construction.
- Gorakhpur–Siliguri Expressway, 529 km, 4-lane (expendable to 6), under-construction (?? completion).
- Aligarh–Palwal Expressway (NH334D), 72 km upgrade of existing NH requiring 46 km new greenfield bypass alignment including 32 km long Andla-Khair-Jattari greenfield, INR2,300 cr, 4-lane, under-construction (?? completion): from Aligarh's Khereshwar Chauraha to Tappal and Palwal with tollplaza at Rajapur village near Khair, directly connecting 2 other major expressways through interchanges (Yamuna Expressway at Tappal and Eastern Peripheral Expressway at Palwal), being constructed by the CDS Infrastructure requiring acquisition of 228 ha land of 43 villages of which land of 100 ha or 18 villages has already been acquired and construction will commence in first week of March 2025 (Feb 2025 update).

==== A2. Across Upper Central Uttar Pradesh (east to west): Haridwar–Kanpur- Varanasi–Prayagraj route, approved. ====
- Upper Ganges Canal Expressway, 150 km, 8-lane, greenfield, Haridwar to Purkazi (Muzaffarnagar) to Sanauta Bridge (Bulandshahr), under-construction (?? completion).
- Ganga Expressway, 594 km, 6-lane (expandable to 8), INR37359 cr, greenfield, Purkazi (Muzaffarnagar) to Varanasi–Prayagraj–Ghazipur, under-construction (March 2024 completion).
  - Meerut Spur: greenfield, from Ganga Expressway to Bijauli village on NH-334 in Meerut district, under-construction (March 2024 completion).
  - Delhi–Meerut Expressway spur, operational.
- Varanasi–Kolkata Expressway, 610 km, 6-lane, INR28,500 cr, under-construction (?? completion).
- Ghazipur–Ballia–Manjhi Ghat Expressway, 6-lane, greenfield, INR618 cr, Ghazipur to Buxar to connect to Patna, under construction ( December 2025 ).

==== A3. Across Lower Central Uttar Pradesh: Delhi–Kanpur–Lucknow–Buxar–Patna direct route, approved. ====
- Delhi–Dehradun Expressway, greenfield,
  - Saharanpur–Haridwar Expressway, 210 km, 6-lane, INR13000 cr, greenfield, from southeast of Saharanpur, under-construction (December 2023 completion).
- Ghaziabad–Kanpur Expressway, 380 om, 4-lane, greenfield, Delhi (Ghaziabad) to Kanpur via Hapur–Bijnor–Moradabad–Fatehgarh, under-construction (December 2025 completion).
- Awadh Expressway, 63 km, 6-lane, INR4700 cr, greenfield, under-construction (Dec 2025 completion).
- Purvanchal Expressway, 340 km, 6-lane (expandable to 8), INR22494 cr, from Lucknow (Chand Serai) to Ghazipur (Haydaria), operational.
  - Gorakhpur Link Expressway, 91 km, 4-lane (expandable to 6), INR5876 cr, greenfield, from Purvanchal Expressway at Azamgarh (Salarpur) to Gorakhpur (Jaitput), under-construction (December 2023).

==== A4. Across Southern Uttar Pradesh (east to west): Delhi–Agra–Chitrakoot route, approved. ====
- Eastern Peripheral Expressway, 135 km, 6-lane, operational.
  - Faridabad–Noida–Ghaziabad Expressway, 56 km, 6-lane (expendable to 8), under-construction (?? completion).
  - Noida–Greater Noida Bundh Expressway
  - Faridabad–Noida–Ghaziabad Expressway
  - Faridabad–Jewar–Khurja Expressway
- Noida–Greater Noida Expressway, 25 km, 6-lane, operational.
- Yamuna Expressway, Delhi to Agra, operational.
- Agra–Lucknow Expressway, 302 km, 6-lane (extendable to 8), operational.
  - Bundelkhand Expressway, 296 km, 4-lane (expandable to 6), INR7766 cr, from Agra-Lucknow Expressway at Kudrail (Etawah district) to Gonda (on NH-35 in Chitrakoot district), operational.
    - Jhansi Link Expressway, under-construction (see below).

=== B. Inter-corridors (north to south): approved. ===
In September 2023 the up government approved 7 North South corridos which will be combination of upgrade of 2000 km brownfield and 600 km greenfield routes. This will bring the cost of logistics down to 10%, which was 15% in 2023. Approved north-south corridors are, Bijnor-Lalitpur, Moradabad-Agra, Pilibhit-Mahoba, Lakhimpur Khiri-Chitrakoot, Gonda-Prayagraj and Basti-Mirzapur.

==== B1. Kotdwar–Bijnor–Lalitpur route: partially approved. ====
- Kotdwar–Bijnor Expressway, greenfield, Kotdwar-Noorpur-Nagina-Anupdhahar to Aligarh, proposed, not yet approved.
- Bijnor–Lalitpur route, approved in Sept 2023.

==== B2. Moradabad–Agra–Gwalior–Kota route: Approved. ====
- Srinagar–Kashipur in Uttrakhand to Moradabad in UP: existing NH309.
- Moradabad–Aligarh–Agra route approved in Sept 2023.
  - Aligarh–Agra Expressway (Aligarh-Khandauli Expressway), 65 km long, INR1,620 cr, greenfield, parallel to NH-504, under-construction (2027 completion). Construction will begin in June 2025 in two simultaneous phases, Phase I (Aligarh to Asroi Hathras, 28 km) and Phase II (Asroi Hathras to Khandauli, 37 km) with soil sampling for Phase II to begin in May 2025 and phase-2 constriction will commence soon after (January 2025 update). Expressway will have 1 Rail-Over-Bridge (ROB), 3 road flyovers, and 55 underpasses.

- Agra-Gwalior Expressway, 88.4 km, INR4612 cr, 6-lane, greenfield, under-construction (2028 completion), construction by GR Infra will begin in October 2025 and will be completed in 30 months by 31 March 2028 (April 2025 update).
- Atal Progress-Way (Chambal Expressway), Bah-Gwalior-Kota, approved.

==== B3. Pilibhit–Mahoba route: approved. ====
Approved in Sept 2023.

==== B4. Lakhimpur Khiri–Chitrakoot route: approved. ====
Approved in Sept 2023.

==== B5. Gonda–Prayagraj route: approved. ====
Approved in Sept 2023.

==== B6. Basti–Mirzapur route: approved. ====
Approved in Sept 2023.

==== B7. Gorakhpur–Varanasi–Kolkatta route: approved. ====
- Gorakhpur Link Expressway, 91 km, 4-lane (expandable to 6), greenfield, from Purvanchal Expressway at Azamgarh (Salarpur) to Gorakhpur (Jaitpur), under-construction.
- NH-28 Azamgarh–Varanasi (not access-controlled), operational.
- Varanasi–Kolkata Expressway

=== C. Inter-corridors (north to south): partially approved or not yet approved. ===
==== C1. Baghpat–Gangoh–Yamunanagar–Nahan route with Gangoh–HathiniKund spur: proposed, not yet approved. ====
- Baghpat, between Barout–Chhaprauli, Kairana, Gangoh greenfield.
- Gangoh–Yamuna bridge: on existing Ambala–Shamli Expressway.
- Yamuna bridge to Yamunanagar, greenfield.
- Yamunanagar (Bhambholi)–Sadhuraha greenfield,
- Sadhuraha–KalaAmb–Nahan, upgrade brownfield.

==== C2. Bareilly–Chandausi–Anupshahar–Bulandshahr–Delhi route: not yet approved. ====
- Bareilly–Bulandshahr brownfield upgrade, not yet approved.

==== C3. Nepal–Bareilly–Jewar–Hodal–Punhana route: not yet approved. ====
- Nepal–Bareilly–Jewar Expressway, greenfield, from (Nepal) via Palian Kalan-Bareilly(Faridpur, Dechara, Bisoli)-Babrala-Bhimpur-Khurja to Jewar, proposed, not yet approved.
- Jewar–Hodal–Punhana Expressway, greenfield, via proposed, not yet approved.

==== C4. Khatima–Bareilly–Etawah to Gwalior–Kota–Mumbai route: partially approved. ====
- Khatima–Bareilly–Etawah Expressway, greenfield, via Khatima–Bareilly–Bhasrala (Badaun)–Patiyali–Kurawali (Mainpuri) to Etawah (to Atal Progress-Way), proposed, not yet approved.
  - Kurawali–Firozabad Expresswar, greenfield spur to connect to Accra Agra, proposed, not yet approved.
- Atal Progress-Way (Chambal Expressway), 404 km, 4-lane (expandable to 6), greenfield, from Etawah (Nanawa) in Uttar Pradesh to Kota (Seemalya at Delhi–Mumbai Expressway) in Rajasthan with a spur to Gwalior in Madhya Pradesh, under construction (?? completion).

==== C5. Nepal (Nanpara)–Barabanki–Lucknow–Jhansi route: partially approved. ====
- Nanpara–Barabanki–Lucknow Expressway, proposed.
- Kanpur–Lucknow Expressway (see above), 63 km, 6-lane, INR4700 cr, greenfield, under-construction (Dec 2025 completion).
- Agra–Kanpur Expressway (see above).
- Bundelkhand Expressway (see above).
- Jhansi Link Expressway, under-construction (?? completion).

==== C6. Shravasti–Gonda–Amethi–Chitrakoot–Satna–Nagpur route: partially approved. ====
- Tulsipur–Gonda–Chitrakoot Expressway, greenfield, via Rudauli–Raebareli–Khaga, approved in Sept 2023.
  - Shravasti–Bhinga (border with Nepal) spur, not yet approved.
  - Shravasti–Tulsipur (border with Nepal) spur, not yet approved.
- Chitrakoot–Satna–Maihar, brownfield upgrade, not yet approved.

==== C7. Nepal (Birganj)-Gorakhpur–Kanpur–Jhansi route: not yet approved. ====
- Birganj–Kushinagar Expressway, greenfield, Birganj–Bettish–Dudhai–Kushinagar, proposed, not yet approved.
- Azamgarh–Kanpur Expressway, greenfield, Kanpur–Raebareli–Chanda etc, proposed, not yet approved.

==== C8. Varanasi–Ambikapur–Raigarh–Sonepur–Vishakhapstnam route: not yet approved. ====
- Gorakhpur–Varanasi then to Ambikapur–Raigarh–Sonepur and at Sonepur merge with "Nepal (Siddharthnagar)–Kushinagar–Ballia–Buxar–Vishakhapstnam route", greenfield & upgrade of brownfield, proposed, not yet approved.

==== C9. Nepal (Siddharthnagar)–Kushinagar–Ballia–Buxar–Vishakhapstnam route: not yet approved. ====
- Siddharthnagar–Kushinagar–Ballia Expressway, greenfield, proposed, not yet approved.
- Buxar–Vishakhapatnam Expeessway, greenfield, via Buxar-Sasaram–Jashpur Nagar–Sundargarh–Jharsuguda–Sambhalpur–Turbha–Kurtamgada–Durgi–Chinaravikovi–Balijipeta–Vizianagram–Vishakhapatnam port, proposed, not yet approved.

=== D. Circular expressways around Delhi ===
- Regional & zonal ring expressways around Delhi, only some exist and most are yet to be approved.

== See also ==
- YEIDA City
- Expressways of India
