= Bharauli =

Bharauli may refer to:

== Places in Bihar, India ==
- Bharauli, Bhojpur
- Bharauli, Saharsa

== Places in Uttar Pradesh, India ==
- Bharouli Khas, Ballia (sometimes referred to as Bharauli, Ballia).
