= Atal Progress-Way =

Proposed road in India

- Chambal Expressway

Route information
- Maintained by National Highways Authority of India (NHAI)
- Length: 404 km (251 mi)
- Existed: 2027 (expected)–present

Major junctions
- West end: Seemalya, Kota district, Rajasthan
- East end: Nanawa, Etawah district, Uttar Pradesh

Location
- Country: India
- States: Rajasthan, Madhya Pradesh and Uttar Pradesh
- Major cities: Kota, Sheopur, Sabalgarh, Morena, Gwalior, Bhind and Etawah

Highway system
- Roads in India; Expressways; National; State; Asian

Atal Progress-Way, also known as Chambal Expressway, is an approved 405 km (252 mi) long, six-lane access-controlled greenfield expressway, which will connect the city of Kota in Rajasthan with the city of Etawah in Uttar Pradesh, through the famous city of Gwalior in Madhya Pradesh. It will pass through three states–Rajasthan, Madhya Pradesh and Uttar Pradesh. The expressway is a part of Bharatmala Pariyojana. The government's aim is to develop the economically backward regions of Chambal division and Gwalior division of Madhya Pradesh through the expressway. The expressway will reduce both travel time and distance, from 10-11 hours at present, to only 6-7 hours, and from 490 km (300 mi) to 404 km (251 mi). It will be built at a cost of approximately ₹ 23,700 crore, which was earlier slated at ₹ 20,000 crore. The expressway has been named as Atal Progress-Way after the former Prime Minister, Atal Bihari Vajpayee, and also because he was born in Gwalior, nearby which the expressway will pass.

== History ==
To improve connectivity, tourism, development and economic growth in the economically backward regions of south-eastern Rajasthan and northern Madhya Pradesh, the Government of Madhya Pradesh planned to build an expressway from Kota to Etawah, in 2017. The expressway will reduce both travel time and distance, from 475 km (295 mi) to 404 km (251 mi), and from 10-11 hours to only 6-7 hours. Once completed, these regions will see exponential growth with the growth of industries and socio-economic development by promoting employment among people living in the regions, which the regions currently lack altogether. The Chief Minister of Madhya Pradesh, Shivraj Singh Chauhan, laid the foundation stone for the project, in September 2020. The Government of India included the expressway in Bharatmala Pariyojana's Phase-I in August 2021. The Cabinet of Madhya Pradesh approved the project in October 2021. In June 2022, the National Highways Authority of India (NHAI) applied for environmental clearance for the project, as it will pass through a small section of the Kuno National Park. The land acquisition for the project also began in the same month. In December 2022, the NHAI issued tender notices for the project's construction. The project will be built at a cost of ₹ 23,645 crore, which was earlier slated at ₹ 20,000 crore, and is expected to be completed by 2027.

== Route ==
Lengths
	mi	km
RJ	44.739	72.000
MP	194.992	313.809
UP	14.267	22.961
Total	253.998	408.770

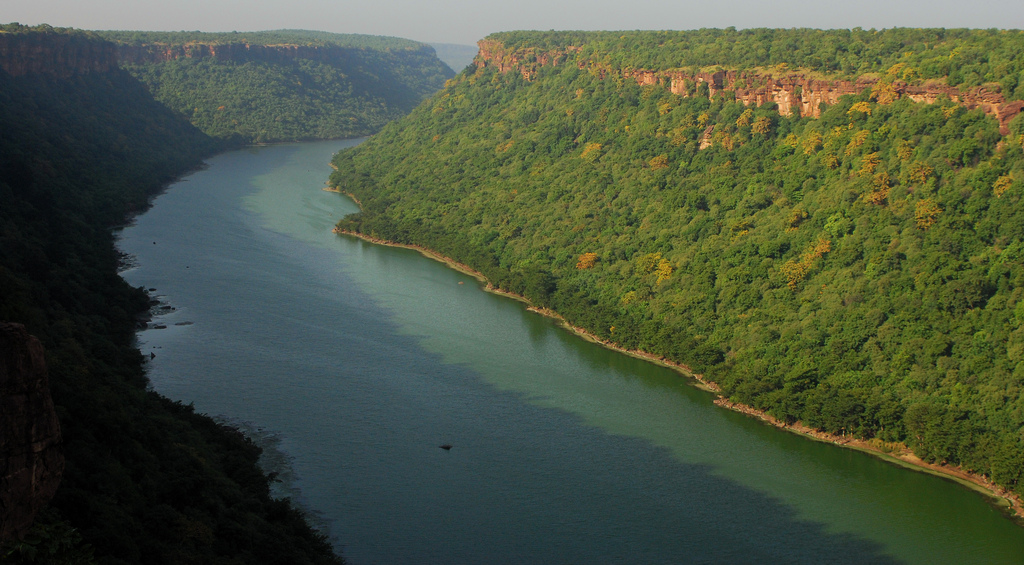
Chambal River flowing through a valley in Rajasthan. The expressway will run along the route of the river.

The expressway will run alongside the route of the Chambal River. It will run through the following states and their regions:

=== Rajasthan ===
The western end of the expressway will be located at Seemalya village in Kota district, and will start with an interchange to the Delhi–Mumbai Expressway. The expressway will cover a distance of 72 km (45 mi) within Rajasthan.

=== Madhya Pradesh ===
The expressway will cover the following districts along with their cities:

- Sheopur, Sheopur district
- Sabalgarh, Morena district
- Morena, Morena district
- Bhind, Bhind district

It will cover a total distance of 313 km (194 mi) within Madhya Pradesh. To link Gwalior, an interchange will be built at Morena along the Agra–Gwalior Expressway.

=== Uttar Pradesh ===
The eastern end of the expressway will be located at Nanawa village in Etawah district, from where a spur will be built to connect the expressway with Agra–Lucknow Expressway. It will cover a total distance of 23 km (14 mi) within Uttar Pradesh.

== Construction ==
The expressway will be fully four-lane, access-controlled and a greenfield project, with a provision of expanding it into six lanes at a future date, by leaving a space in between it, with a width of 100 metres in the Madhya Pradesh section, and 60 metres in Rajasthan and Uttar Pradesh sections. The land acquisition of the project after the environmental clearance began in June 2022, and the bidding process for the project's construction was started by the National Highways Authority of India (NHAI) in December 2022. The expressway will be built using the Hybrid Annuity Model (HAM) mode of construction. Currently, the project is under bidding, land acquisition and Detailed Project Report (DPR) preparation, which is being prepared by the Bhopal-based firm, after forming a joint venture with another firm, L.N. Malviya Infra Projects – Pioneer Infra Consultants JV. The project has been divided into six packages, while the package division for the Uttar Pradesh section is still underway. The following table lists the packages, contractors and their statuses.

=== Rajasthan ===
Packages	Chainages (Note: Distances from the origin of the expressway, i.e., Kota.)	Contractor	Status
Package-1	TBD	TBD	Bidding process underway
Package-2	TBD	TBD	Bidding process underway

=== Madhya Pradesh ===
Packages	Chainages	Contractor	Status
Package-1	Sada ka Pada village to Chhavar village (94.100 km to 155.000 km), Sheopur district	TBA	Bidding process and land acquisition underway
Package-2	Chhavar to Jhundpura (Morena district) (155.400 km to 206.000 km)	TBA	Bidding process and land acquisition underway
Package-3	Jhundpura to Maithana village (206.000 km 265.000 km), Morena district	TBA	Bidding process and land acquisition underway
Package-4	Maithana village to Kuretha village (265.000 km 312.950 km), Morena district	TBA	Bidding process and land acquisition underway

The remaining stretch till Etawah is under package division and bidding process.

== Benefits ==
The expressway will benefit Central India as well as Eastern India as follows:

- Trade: The expressway will help in direct transportation of cargo from Eastern India to Western India, as currently, though a connection exists via the National Highway 27 (East-West Corridor) (NH-27), but it has become constrained and experiences high traffic and long delays in transport to facilitate trade. The expressway will become an alternative to that route and will relieve pressure on NH-27, thus resulting in the growth of the overall national economy, by reducing dependency on imports and increasing exports.
- Tourism: The expressway will help to facilitate tourism in northern Madhya Pradesh, as it has the presence of several tourist spots as well as major tourist destinations, like Gwalior and wildlife parks, sanctuaries, like Ranthambore National Park and Kuno National Park, which are well known for their tiger reserves and other animals and activities for tourists, and Kuno for its tigers and recently introduced Cheetahs. The rise in tourist arrivals will mark the growth of adjoining regions and towns along with cities nearby.
- Connectivity: The expressway will not only create a direct route from Kota to Etawah, but will also create a direct route from Eastern and Northeast India to Western India. For example, goods and people could be transported directly to Mumbai from Kolkata, as well as from Guwahati and other north-eastern states, via the Varanasi–Kolkata Expressway and Purvanchal Expressway, Agra–Lucknow Expressway, Atal Progress-Way and the Delhi–Mumbai Expressway (Atal P-Way begins from there), thus resulting in faster, better and safer commute in the northern part of the country.
- Protection of the Environment: To ensure the protection of the green cover, plants and trees will be planted in between and along the entire route of the expressway, and to avoid excess deforestation through the section of Kuno National Park, sustainable methods of construction will be used.
- Employment: Due to increase in industrial activities along the expressway's route, various agricultural and industrial initiatives to help the state's economy and growth. The establishment of these numerous centres will result in multiple job possibilities for thousands of people living in both the states.

== Environmental concerns ==
In July 2022, in a meeting of the Expert Appraisal Committee (EAC) of the Ministry of Environment, Forest and Climate Change (MoEFCC), the EAC raised concerns on the alignment of the expressway's Sheopur and Morena districts, due to the high presence of the well- known rugged eroded topography, the ravines of the Chambal region, or also known as the 'bad lands'. The construction in these parts will cause the soil to get further eroded, thus exposing the parent rock, which may result in a harm to the surrounding environment and other unaffected areas by drought, and the permanent stoppage of any agricultural activities on the entire region. If these changes occur, it would be irreversible to change back to the land what it was before and the efforts taken to turn ravines into normal, plain land. So the Ministry advised the National Highways Authority of India (NHAI) to change the alignment of the expressway. In view of this, the NHAI changed the route by taking a new land survey, as far from the ravines as possible, and to ensure as much as impacts to be created on the socio-economic development of the entire Chambal region after the expressway's completion.

== Status updates ==
- 2017: The plan of the expressway was proposed by the Government of Madhya Pradesh.
- September 2020: The foundation stone for the project was laid by the Chief Minister of Madhya Pradesh, Shivraj Singh Chauhan.
- August 2021: The Government of India approved the project and included it in Bharatmala Pariyojana's Phase-I.
- October 2021: The Cabinet of Madhya Pradesh approved the project.
- June 2022: The National Highways Authority of India (NHAI) applied for environmental clearance for the project, as it will pass through a small section of the Kuno National Park, and also began land acquisition for the project.
- December 2022: The NHAI issued tender notices for the project's construction.
- March 2023: 16 firms bid for the project's first two packages in the Madhya Pradesh section.

== See also ==
- Expressways of India
