= Upper Ganges Canal Expressway =

Planned road in India

Route information
- Length: 150 km (93 mi)

Major junctions
- West end: Bulandshahr, Noida
- East end: Haridwar, Muzaffarnagar

Location
- Country: India
- States: Uttar Pradesh, Uttarakhand

Highway system
- Roads in India; Expressways; National; State; Asian

Upper Ganges Canal Expressway, also known as Hindon Expressway, is an under-construction eight-lane 150-kilometre-long (93 mi) expressway in Uttar Pradesh state of India. As an extension of Ganga Expressway, it runs from Bulandshahr in Uttar Pradesh to Haridwar in Uttarakhand, through Muzaffarnagar and Roorkee.

== Current status ==
- 2025 Jan: Chief Minister Yogi Adityanath approved the project, paving the way for construction.

== See also ==
- Expressways in Uttar Pradesh
  - Ludhiana-Siliguri Industrial Corridor
    - Gorakhpur–Siliguri Expressway
    - Ambala-Shamli Expressway
  - Purvanchal Expressway
  - Bundelkhand Expressway
- Expressways in India
