= Awadh Expressway =

Indian expressway connecting Kanpur and Lucknow

Awadh Expressway
- Awadh Expressway in red

Route information
- Maintained by National Highways Authority of India (NHAI)
- Length: 62.76 km (39.00 mi)
- Status: Open
- Existed: 13 July 2026–present

Major junctions
- West end: NH 27 in Azad Chauraha, Kanpur
- East end: NH 27 in Shaheed Path, Lucknow

Location
- Country: India
- States: Uttar Pradesh
- Major cities: Kanpur, Lucknow

Highway system
- Roads in India; Expressways; National; State; Asian

The Awadh Expressway also known as Kanpur-Lucknow Expressway is a 63-kilometre-long (39 mi), six-lane wide (expandable to 8) access-controlled expressway which connects two major cities Lucknow and Kanpur of the Awadh Region of Uttar Pradesh, India. It has been given the status of National Expressway 6 (NE 6) by the Government of India.

The expressway starts from its junction with NH-27 near Shaheed Path in South Lucknow (km 11.000 of existing NH-27) connecting Bani, Kantha, Amarsas and terminating at its junction with NH No. 27 (km 71.300 of existing NH-27) near Azad Marg, Kanpur where it is connected to the Udyog Path, Kanpur. It also intersects the Ganga Expressway in Unnao district.

The expressway runs parallel to the existing National Highway 27 (NH-27), which connects Kanpur and Lucknow with a distance of about 85 km (53 mi).

The expressway's foundation stone was laid in March 2019 (again on January 5, 2022), and was notified as NE 6 in the Gazette of India in December 2020. Construction work on the expressway has been completed and PNC Infratech, the company responsible behind the construction of this project received their completion certificate on 11 June 2026. The project was inaugurated on 13 July 2026.

This mix of brownfield-upgrade and greenfield project's Detailed Project Report (DPR) was prepared by Egis India Consulting Engineers Pvt. Ltd. Lucknow – Kanpur Expressway have 2 elevated portions between Amausi and Bani – from chainage 13.025 to 16.400 (3.375 km) and 18.480 to 27.620 (9.14 km). It consists of 3 major bridges, 28 minor bridges, 38 underpasses and 6 flyovers.

== Interconnectivity ==
It is connected to the Kanpur Ring Road/Udyog Path.

It has a trijunction of 3 expressways between Kanpur and Unnao; where the Awadh Expressway intersects with the proposed Kanpur-Noida Expressway and Ganga Expressway.

== Status updates ==
- Nov 2018: Detailed Project Report for ₹4,500 crore project finalised and submitted to the Government of Uttar Pradesh .
- Mar 2019: Foundation stone laid down on 7 March by Union Ministers - Rajnath Singh and Nitin Gadkari for this project.
- May 2019: 90% land to be acquired by June 2019 followed by tendering. Civil work is expected to start by August 2019.
- Feb 2020: Notification for land acquisition to be issued soon.
- Aug 2020: Construction to start by March 2021, and expressway to be ready by March 2023.
- Sep 2020: Land acquisition under progress.
- Dec 2020: Lucknow Kanpur Expressway, declared as NE 6 on December 15, 2020.
- Feb 2021: Land acquisition done. Civil engineering work is expected to start in July 2021, and thereafter, it is expected to take 30 more months for project completion.
- June 2021: 400 hectares out of total requirement of 465 hectare land is acquired i.e. 86% land acquired. NHAI to bid out expressway in July and the civil work is expected to start by the end of the year.
- Jan 2022: Union Road Transport and Highways Minister Shri Nitin Gadkari, Union Defence Minister Shri Rajnath Singh and CM Yogi Adityanath laid the foundation stone of Kanpur Lucknow expressway at Lucknow as on 5 Jan 2022.
- Feb 2022: PNC Infratech emerges as the Lowest Bidder and is selected by NHAI to build and operate both packages of the 6-lane (expandable to 8) Expressway under the Hybrid Annuity Model (HAM) beating Apco Infratech, MEIL, Gawar Construction and GR Infraprojects.
- July 2022: The Lucknow–Kanpur Expressway renamed as Awadh Expressway.
- October 2025: Unnao section is complete with finishing touches done, while the work is underway in Lucknow package.
- April 2026: Major construction work is completed and the elevated section is undergoing trial. Toll rates of the expressway are announced with one way toll of light private vehicle stands at 275 ₹ while the round trip toll stands at 415 ₹ finishing works on toll plazas remain the overall progress stands at 99%.
- May 2026: Major work at couple of ramps and toll plazas in the Lucknow package is still underway, leading to significant delay in the operation of expressway.
- June 2026: All the major construction work has been completed and company responsible behind the construction of this project PNC Infratech received their completion certificate.
- July 2026: Expressway inaugurated on 13 July 2026.

== Construction Quality Controversies ==
Within three weeks of inauguration, the expressway faced severe damage due to first rain. Some parts of road was compressed down. There were multiple cracks seen on the expressway which eventually led to patch work by the contractor but investigation conducted by experts from IIT Kharagpur recommended complete reconstruction of affected stretches.

Following this, NHAI barred the concessionaire PNC Infratech, and its subsidiaries from bidding for any NHAI projects for three years—the maximum penalty permitted under the contract conditions.. As the toll operator, the company also required to compensate NHAI for the loss of toll revenue, as toll collection has been completely suspended along the entire stretch.

== See also ==
- Bundelkhand Expressway
- Purvanchal Expressway
- Yamuna Expressway
- Ganga Expressway
- Udyog Path
- Kisan Path
- Kanpur-Noida Expressway
