= Varanasi–Kolkata Expressway =

Proposed expressway in India

Route information
- Maintained by National Highways Authority of India (NHAI)
- Length: 710 km (440 mi)
- Status: Under construction
- Existed: 2027 (expected)–present

Major junctions
- West end: Revasa, Chandauli district, Uttar Pradesh
- East end: Sarisha, nearDiamond Harbour, West Bengal

Location
- Country: India
- States: Uttar Pradesh, Bihar, Jharkhand and West Bengal
- Major cities: Varanasi, Chandauli, Bhabua, Sasaram, Aurangabad, Gaya, Chatra, Hazaribagh, Ramgarh, Ranchi, Bokaro, Purulia, Bankura, Bishnupur, Panskura, Haldia, Diamond Harbour and Kolkata

Highway system
- Roads in India; Expressways; National; State; Asian

Varanasi–Ranchi–Kolkata Expressway (NH-319B), is an under-construction 710 km (440 mi) long, six-lane, greenfield access-controlled expressway, which will connect the spiritual city of Varanasi in Uttar Pradesh with the capital of West Bengal, Kolkata, through the capital of Jharkhand, Ranchi. It will run almost parallel to the Grand Trunk Road or the Asian Highway 1, and will pass through four states–Uttar Pradesh, Bihar, Jharkhand and West Bengal. The expressway is a part of Bharatmala Pariyojana, and it will reduce both travel time and distance, from 14-15 hours to only 10-11 hours. It will start from Revasa village near Mughalsarai, Chandauli district in Uttar Pradesh, and will terminate near Sarisha, near Diamond Harbour, West Bengal.

The foundation stone for the expressway's construction was laid by Prime Minister Narendra Modi on 23 February 2024. To be built at a cost of about ₹35,000 crore (US$3.6 billion), it is expected to be completed by 2026/27.

== History ==
The Government of India has given special emphasis on infrastructure development in FY 2022–23. To improve connectivity, tourism, development and economic growth in eastern India, the Government of India planned to build a new expressway from Varanasi to Kolkata through Ranchi. The expressway is expected to cut travel time from 12 to 14 hours to 6–7 hours, and from 690 km (430 mi) to 610 km (380 mi). It will pass through four states–Uttar Pradesh, Bihar, Jharkhand and West Bengal. Once completed, these states will see exponential growth with the growth of industries and socio-economic development by promoting employment among people living in the regions, which the regions currently mostly lack altogether. The expressway was earlier slated to be eight-lane, but was reduced six lanes due to lack of space. It was initially planned to be built at a cost of ₹23,500 crore (US$2.4 billion), and will be completed by 2027, which was earlier scheduled in the first quarter of 2026. On 23 February 2024, the foundation stone for the construction was laid by Prime Minister Narendra Modi for its first package till Bihar, to be built at a cost of about ₹35,000 crore (US$3.6 billion).

== Route ==
Lengths
	mi	km
UP	14	23
BR	105	169
JH	122	196
WB	201	323
Total	440	710

=== Uttar Pradesh ===
The western terminus of the expressway will be located in Chandauli district near Varanasi in Uttar Pradesh. The western end of the expressway near Barhuli village will be connected with the National Highway 19 (NH-19) and the Varanasi Ring Road. The expressway will cover a total distance of 22 km (14 mi) within Uttar Pradesh.

=== Bihar ===
The expressway will cross the Uttar Pradesh-Bihar border and will enter through Kaimur district of Bihar. It will cross the state through the districts of Kaimur, Aurangabad, Rohtas and Gaya. The expressway will cover a total distance of 169 km (105 mi) within Bihar.

=== Jharkhand ===
The expressway will cross the Bihar-Jharkhand border and will enter the Chatra district of Jharkhand. It will cross the state through the districts of Chatra, Hazaribagh, Ramgarh and Bokaro. The expressway will cover a total distance of 196 km (122 mi) within Jharkhand.

=== West Bengal ===
The eastern terminus of the expressway will be located at Haldia, West Bengal with an extended route including a Vertical Lift Bridge on Hooghly River to connect Sarisha near Diamond Harbour . It will cross the state through the districts of Purulia, Bankura, Paschim Medinipur, Hooghly and Purba Medinipur. The expressway will cover a total distance of 323 km (201 mi) within West Bengal.

== Construction ==
The expressway will be fully six-lane and a greenfield project, and will be built using the Engineering, Procurement and Construction (EPC) construction model, which provides and ensures security, liability caps, and a performance guarantee for an infrastructure. For the project, the soil testing work in Jharkhand was conducted in June 2022. It will run almost parallel with the National Highway 19 (NH-19), or the Asian Highway 1 or the Grand Trunk Road. The land acquisition process started in January 2022 on an 80-km section of the expressway, from Tilouthu to Imamganj in Bihar. The National Highways Authority of India (NHAI) released tenders and invited bids in November 2022 for the construction of the expressway. As of March 2023, the project has been divided into 13 packages, and the package division for the West Bengal section is still underway. In Package-1, NHAI issued global tenders, and allocated ₹ 988 crore for the construction of the 27 km stretch from Varanasi Ring Road in Uttar Pradesh to Khainti village in Bihar, and in Package-2, ₹ 945 crore has been allocated for the construction of another 27 km stretch from Khainti village to Palka village in Bihar, wherein it will be built using the Hybrid Annuity Model (HAM) mode of construction. In the West Bengal section, the Government of West Bengal has directed 6 districts of the state to carry out land acquisition for the project, and is underway. Currently, the project is under Detailed Project Report (DPR) preparation and land acquisition. The foundation stone for the expressway's construction by starting from the first package was laid by Prime Minister Narendra Modi in February 2024. The following table list the project's packages, contractors and their statuses.

=== Uttar Pradesh/Bihar ===
Packages	Chainages (Note: Distances from the origin of the expressway, i.e., Varanasi.)	Contractor	Status
Package-1	Junction with NH-19 and Varanasi Ring Road near Rewasa village (Chandauli district) to junction with Chandauli-Chainpur road near Khainti village (Kaimur district, Bihar) (0.000 km-27.000 km)	NKC Projects	Land acquisition completed

=== Bihar ===
Packages	Chainages	Contractor	Status
Package-2	Junction with Chandauli-Chainpur Road near Khainti village to junction with Bhabhua-Adhaura road near Palka village, Kaimur district (27.000 km-54.000 km)	PNC Infratech Pvt. Ltd.	Land acquisition underway
Package-3	Junction with Bhabhua-Adhaura road in Bhairopur village to Konki village (Rohtas district) (54.000 km-90.000 km)	PNC Infratech Pvt. Ltd.	Land acquisition underway
Package-4	Konki village to Malpura village (From KM. 90+000 to KM. 105+300)	TBA	Bidding process underway
Package-5	Junction with NH-119 in Malpura village to Lerua village (Aurangabad district), including a 4-lane spur to NH-19 from NH-119 (spur length-6.6 km) (105.300 km to 116.000 km)	TBA	Bidding process underway
Package-6	Pachmon village to Anarbansalea village, Aurangabad district (116.000 km to 151.200 km)	PNC Infratech Pvt. Ltd.	Land acquisition underway
Package-7	Anarbansalea village to Sagrampur village (Gaya district) (151.200 km to 184.700 km)	GR Infraprojects	Land acquisition underway

=== Jharkhand ===
Packages	Chainages	Contractor	Status
Package-8	Sonepurbigha village to junction with NH-22 near Chatra, Chatra district (184.700 km to 222.000 km)	Tracks and Towers Infratech Pvt. Ltd.–Rail Vikas Nigam Limited (JV)	Land acquisition underway
Package-9	Chatra to junction with NH-100 in Deoria village (Hazaribagh district) (222.000 km to 253.000 km)	Ram Kripal Singh Construction Pvt. Ltd.	Land acquisition underway
Package-10	Deoria village to Donoreshan village (Ramgarh district) (253.000 km to 288.600 km)	H.G. Infra Engineering Ltd.	Land acquisition underway
Package-11	Donoreshan village to junction with NH-20 in Bongabar village, Ramgarh district (288.600 km to 325.500 km)	Ceigall India	Work Started by C P ARORA On Back To Back Basis
Package-12	Junction with NH-20 in Bongabar village to Junction with NH-320 in Lepo village (Bokaro district) (325.500 km to 358.500 km)	Ceigall India	Land acquisition underway
Package-13	Junction with NH-320 in Lepo village to Kamlapur village (Jharkhand-West Bengal border) (358.500 km to 387.200 km)	H.G. Infra Engineering Ltd.	Land acquisition underway

The remaining stretch till Kolkata is under package division, land acquisition may start soon as DPR preparation is finished.

=== West Bengal ===
Packages	Chainages	Contractor	Status
Package-14	Guridih village (JH/WB) Border to Sijumakhna Village (from Km 387.200 to Km 439.040) section NH-319B	TBA	Bidding process underway
Package-15	Sijumakhna Village to Nayada Village (from Km 439+040 to Km 491+200) section NH-319B	TBA	Bidding process underway
Package-16	Nayada village to Patpur village (from Km 491.200 to Km 541.100)	TBA	Bidding process underway
Package-17	Patpur village to Chanditala village (from Km 541.100 to Km 587.260)	TBA	Bidding process underway
Package-18	Chanditala village to Sarisha near Diamond Harbor (Km 587.260 to Km 623)	TBA	Bidding process underway

== Benefits ==
The expressway will benefit eastern India along with the entire country as follows:

- Trade: The expressway will help to boost trade, increase exports and reduce dependency on imports, as it will result in the growth of industries in Eastern India, along the route through which the expressway will pass, especially in the adjoining regions of Kolkata further, and due to its location near the sea with two major ports–Kolkata and Haldia, resulting in a huge benefit for transporting steel and coal to the ports from the famous steel plants and coal mines located in the mineral-rich state of Jharkhand, the Bokaro Steel Plant and coal mines of Dhanbad, thus accelerating economic growth and development in the four states.
- Tourism: It will help to boost tourism by promoting it in places which currently lack, along its route. The alignment of the expressway has been specially made through the backward areas to help facilitate tourism and development, due to a high presence of small tourist spots, dotted across the four states, especially in Jharkhand and the western part of West Bengal, but remain relatively unknown to most people because of lack of accessibility to those areas.
- Connectivity: The expressway will create a direct 710 km route between Varanasi and Kolkata, by reducing both travel time and distance from 14 to 11 hours It will not only connect Varanasi, but will also connect Kolkata directly with the national capital, as well as Jammu and Kashmir, through a series of expressways, along with this–Purvanchal Expressway, Agra–Lucknow Expressway and Yamuna Expressway to Delhi, and to Jammu and Kashmir via the Delhi–Katra Expressway. In the coming years, instead of Purvanchal and Agra–Lucknow Expressways, the Ganga Expressway will connect Kolkata more faster, as well as with Haridwar. This expressway till Varanasi will also connect Rajasthan via the Chambal Expressway through the Agra–Lucknow Expressway. This series of expressways will result in faster, better and safer commute for both the transport of goods and people, with the rest of the country, from Eastern India.
- Protection of the Environment: To protect the green cover, plants and trees will be planted between and on both sides along the entire route of the expressway. In the Kaimur district section of Bihar, a 5 km-long tunnel will be built along the hilly region to avoid deforestation.
- Employment: Due to increase in industrial activities along the expressway's route, various agricultural and industrial initiatives will help in the economy and growth of Eastern India. The establishment of these numerous centres will result in multiple job possibilities for thousands of people living in the four states.

== Status updates ==
- 2019: The expressway's plan was proposed by the Ministry of Road Transport and Highways (MoRTH).
- 2023 Jan: Land acquisition began for the project.
- 2023 Mar: 15 bidders participated to construct 8 packages of the expressway.
- 2023 Apr: The bidding process has been entirely completed for the Jharkhand section, and land acquisition has started. Bids have been received for Jharkhand-West Bengal border section in March 2023 and will be awarded by April-May.
- 2024 Feb: The foundation stone was laid by Prime Minister Narendra Modi for the construction of the expressway.
- *2025 Dec: On 413-km Jharkhand (Ranchi)–Varanasi section the construction work is in varying stages of physical progress and work on 41 is stalled due to delay in forests clearances, i.e. Khajuri–Wyndhamganj 92% complete on UP section, Bhogu–Sankha 75% complete in Jharkhand (3.5 km out of 50 km stalled), Udaipura–Bhogu in Jharkhand 20% complete in 2024 (22 km out of 50 km is stalled), and Kuru–Udaipura section 16 km out of 39 km stalled and no work has started due to delay in forest clearance by Jharkhand government.

== See also ==
- National Highways of India
- Expressways of India
- National Highways Authority of India
- Grand Trunk Road
- Asian Highway 1
- Transport in India
- Tourism in India
