= Bangarmau Airstrip =

Bangarmau Airstrip
- IATA: none; ICAO: none

Summary
- Airport type: Military
- Owner/Operator: Indian Air Force
- Location: Along Agra Lucknow Expressway, at Bangarmau, Unnao, Uttar Pradesh, India
- Elevation AMSL: 417 ft / 127 m
- Coordinates: 26.919334°N 80.253053°E

Map
- Location of the airstrip in Uttar Pradesh Bangarmau Airstrip (India)

Helipads
Number	Length		Surface
Number	ft	m	Surface
28/08	10,300	3,139	Highway

Bangarmau Airstrip (Hindi: बांगरमऊ एयरस्ट्रिप) is an road runway located near the village Naseerpur Bhikhan in Unnao district of Uttar Pradesh, India. The airstrip is a part of the Agra–Lucknow Expressway and belongs to the Indian Air Force. This is located around 65 km (40 mi) from Lucknow. Multiple military aircraft including fighter aircraft and military transport aircraft have conducted successful landings here as part of trials in 2017. The airstrip has a length of around 3.3 km and will serve as emergency landing bases for any front line fighters. A public response vehicle along with a large contingent of the Uttar Pradesh Police has been based nearby to support operations and provide security.

== History ==
The Dassault Mirage 2000 conducted its maiden landing on the airstrip in 2015 followed by more exercises in May 2016. Six Sukhoi Su-30MKI fighters also landed in the facility in November 2016.

On 24 October 2017, a three hour-long mock drill was conducted by the Indian Air Force which included landings of C-130J Super Hercules equipped with Garud Commando Force as well as Su-30MKI, SEPECAT Jaguar and Mirage 2000 from the airstrip. A total of 16 IAF aircraft conducted landing and touch-and-go manoeuvres from the airstrip. IAF simulated real-time emergencies including scenarios when airbases will not be available for use if attacked. This marked the maiden landing of a transport aircraft on the airstrip.
