= Nehru Setu =

Railway bridge in Rohtas, Bihar, India

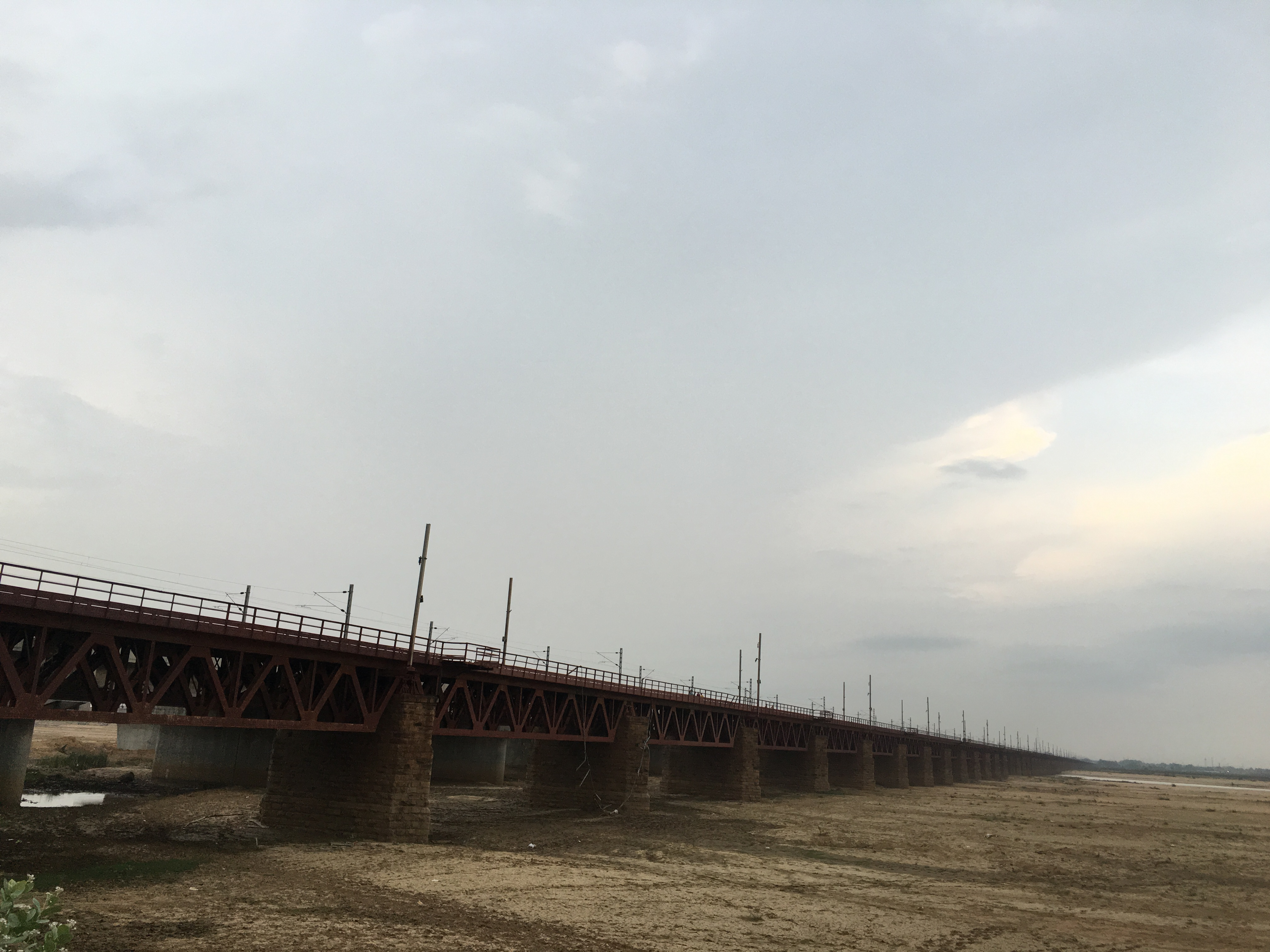
- Coordinates: 24.8925°N 84.2162°E
- Carries: Grand Chord railway track
- Crosses: Son River
- Locale: Dehri-Son Nagar

Characteristics
- Design: Steel girders on stone pillars
- Material: Stone & Steel
- Total length: 3,059 metres (10,036 ft)
- Longest span: 32.5 metres (107 ft)
- No. of spans: 93

History
- Opened: 27 February 1900

Location
- Interactive map of Nehru Setu

Nehru Setu is a railway bridge across the Son River, connecting Dehri-on-Son and Son Nagar, in Bihar.

== The Son river ==
Sir John Houlton, the veteran British administrator, who spent many years in the state, describes the Son as follows, "After passing the steep escarpments of the Kaimur range, it flows straight across the plain to the Ganges. For much of this distance it is over two miles – and at one point, opposite Tilothu – three miles wide. In the dry weather there is vast expanse of sand, with a stream not more than a hundred yards wide, and the hot west winds pile up the sand on the east bank, making natural embankments. After heavy rain in the hills even this wide bed cannot carry the waters of the Son and disastrous floods in Shahabad, Gaya, and Patna are not uncommon".

== The Grand Chord ==
When the railway line between Kolkata and Delhi was first laid, it passed through Bhagalpur, Lakhisarai, Patna and Mughalsarai, covering a distance of 1,636 km. Subsequently, the Grand Chord line via Gaya reduced the distance by 80 km. The main line crosses the Son over the Koilwar bridge and the Dehri-Son Nagar bridge accommodates the Grand Chord line.

Steel girders resting on 93 stone pillars, each a hundred feet apart, form the rail bridge. The total length of the bridge over abutments is 3,064 metres (10,052 ft). It was opened for traffic on 27 February 1900. When it was built, it was the longest bridge in India and was believed to be the second longest bridge in the world. Subsequently, longer road bridges were built but it remained the longest rail bridge for many years. The opening of the 4.62 km Vembanad Rail Bridge, connecting the Container Transshipment Terminal on Vallarpadam Island to Edappally, in February 2011, pushed it to the second position.

== Surroundings ==
Jawahar Setu, the road bridge carrying NH 2 and running parallel to the Nehru Setu, was constructed in 1963–65.

The Government of Bihar sanctioned in 2008, a bridge across the Son River connecting Arwal and Sahar in Bhojpur district.

The Koilwar bridge preceded the Nehru Setu and was opened in 1862. A four-lane road bridge, carrying NH 30, parallel to the existing rail and road Koilwar Bridge, has been planned.

An anicut was constructed across the Son, a little upstream of the present Nehru Setu and Jawahar Setu, in 1873–74. The Indrapuri Barrage was constructed, 8 km upstream, and commissioned in 1968. Its distance from Aurangabad is approximately 15 km and 10 km from Dehri On Sone.

== See also ==
- List of longest bridges in the world
- List of longest bridges above water in India
