= Koilwar Bridge =

India's oldest operational River bridge

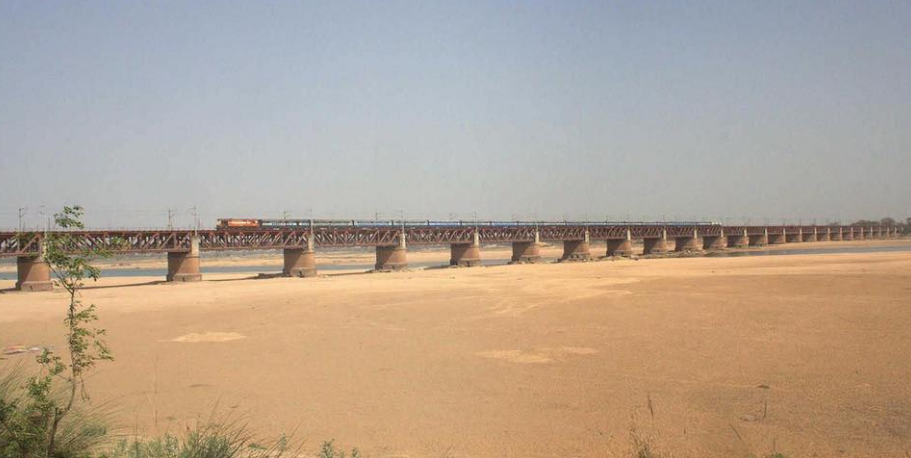
- A view of 'Koilwar bridge'
- Coordinates: 25°33′57″N 84°47′54″E
- Carries: New Delhi-Patna-Howrah railway line
- Crosses: River Sone
- Locale: Koilwar, Bhojpur, Bihar
- Official name: Abdul Bari Bridge
- Maintained by: Indian Railways (East-Central Railway Zone)

Characteristics
- Design: Lattice girder
- Material: Concrete & steel
- Total length: 1,440 metres (4,720 ft)
- No. of lanes: 2

History
- Designer: George Turnbull
- Construction start: 1856
- Construction end: 1862
- Opened: 4 November 1862

Location
- Interactive map of Koilwar Bridge

Koilwar Bridge, (officially Abdul Bari Bridge) at Koilwar in Bhojpur spans the Sone river. This 1.44 km long, 2-lane, rail-cum-road bridge connects the city of Arrah with Patna, the capital of Bihar state in India. The bridge is named after Indian academic and social reformer Prof. Abdul Bari, and is presently the oldest operational railway bridge in India, standing since 4 November 1862. It is shown in the 1982 Oscar award winning film Gandhi, directed by Richard Attenborough. From 1862 to 1900, Koilwar Bridge remained as the longest river bridge in India.

== About ==
A page from George Turnbull's 1851 notebook detailing his determining the approximate width of the mile-wide Sone River at the point where he decided that the bridge should be built. For the measurements he used his pocket compass and 22-yard chains.

George Turnbull's 1851 diary of four of his 12-day overland journey from Calcutta (travelling by night) to Sone River, and his survey there.

The steel lattice girder Koilwar Bridge (known as Sone Bridge when it was built) was the longest bridge in the subcontinent when built: construction started in 1856, disrupted by the Revolt of 1857, and completed in 1862. A 2-lane-wide road (Old NH 30) runs under the twin rail tracks. It connects Arrah on the west side to Bihta, Danapur and Patna on the east side of Sone river.

The Koilwar Bridge was inaugurated by the then Viceroy and Governor-General of India Lord Elgin, who said, "... this magnificent bridge is exceeded in magnitude by only one bridge in the world". The bridge was designed by James Meadows Rendel and Sir Matthew Digby Wyatt. It remained as the longest river bridge in the Indian subcontinent, till it was overtaken by the 3.05-km long Upper Sone Bridge (Nehru Setu) on 27 February 1900.

== History ==
An initial survey of the bridge site was made on 17 February 1851 by George Turnbull, Chief Engineer of the East Indian Railway Company: he determined that the river then was 5,350 feet (1,630 m) feet across — the completed bridge was 5,280 feet (1,610 m) feet across. He settled on the site near Pures "where the banks are well defined, and the channel had evidently for ages been confined within certain limits, proved by the existence of old Hindoo temples, far before the Mohammaden works at Muneer, built about 200 years [before 1851]."

By November 1859, both abutments and 16 of the 26 piers were being built and the well-sinking for the remaining piers progressing. By 21 December 1860, three of the iron spans were in place; 4572 tons of the estimated 5683 final tons of iron-work for the bridge had arrived from England.

George Turnbull inspected the bridge and judged it complete on 4 November 1862. On 11, 12 and 13 December 1862, "a set of experiments with couple engines, testing the Keeul, Hullohur and Soane bridges, with an assembly of Government engineers, and our railing engineers; all very satisfactory." On 5 February 1863, a special train from Howrah took Turnbull, the Viceroy Lord Elgin, Lt Governor Sir Cecil Beadon and others over two days to Benares: they alighted at the bridge and inspected it. In Benares there was a durbar on 7 February to celebrate the building of the railway and particularly the bridging of the Sone, the largest tributary of the Ganges.

Sand erosion near the pillars of this old bridge has created structural problems recently.

== New Koilwar Bridge ==
A new 1.52 km long, 6-lane wide road bridge, parallel to the existing 2-lane wide Koilwar Bridge, has been inaugurated by Union Minister Nitin Gadkari on 10 December 2020. New Koilwar Bridge or Vashishtha Narayan Setu is named after Indian mathematician and Padma Shri awardee Vashishtha Narayan Singh.

== See also ==
- Digha–Sonpur Bridge
- Arrah-Chhapra Bridge
- New Koilwar Bridge
- List of road–rail bridges
- List of longest bridges above water in India
