= Binawar =

Binawar Binavar
- Town
- Location in Uttar Pradesh, India
- Coordinates: 28.13°N 79.22°E
- Country: India
- State: Uttar Pradesh
- District: Badaun

Languages
  - Official: Hindi
- Time zone: UTC+5:30 (IST)
- PIN: 243634
- Vehicle registration: UP 24

Binawar is a town and a gram panchayat in Badaun District in the Indian state of Uttar Pradesh. It is located 14 km (8.7 mi) away from Budaun railway station. Its census code is 128304. Binawar falls on Bareilly-Budaun road of Rohilkhand division.
