= Ganga Expressway =

Expressway in Uttar Pradesh, India

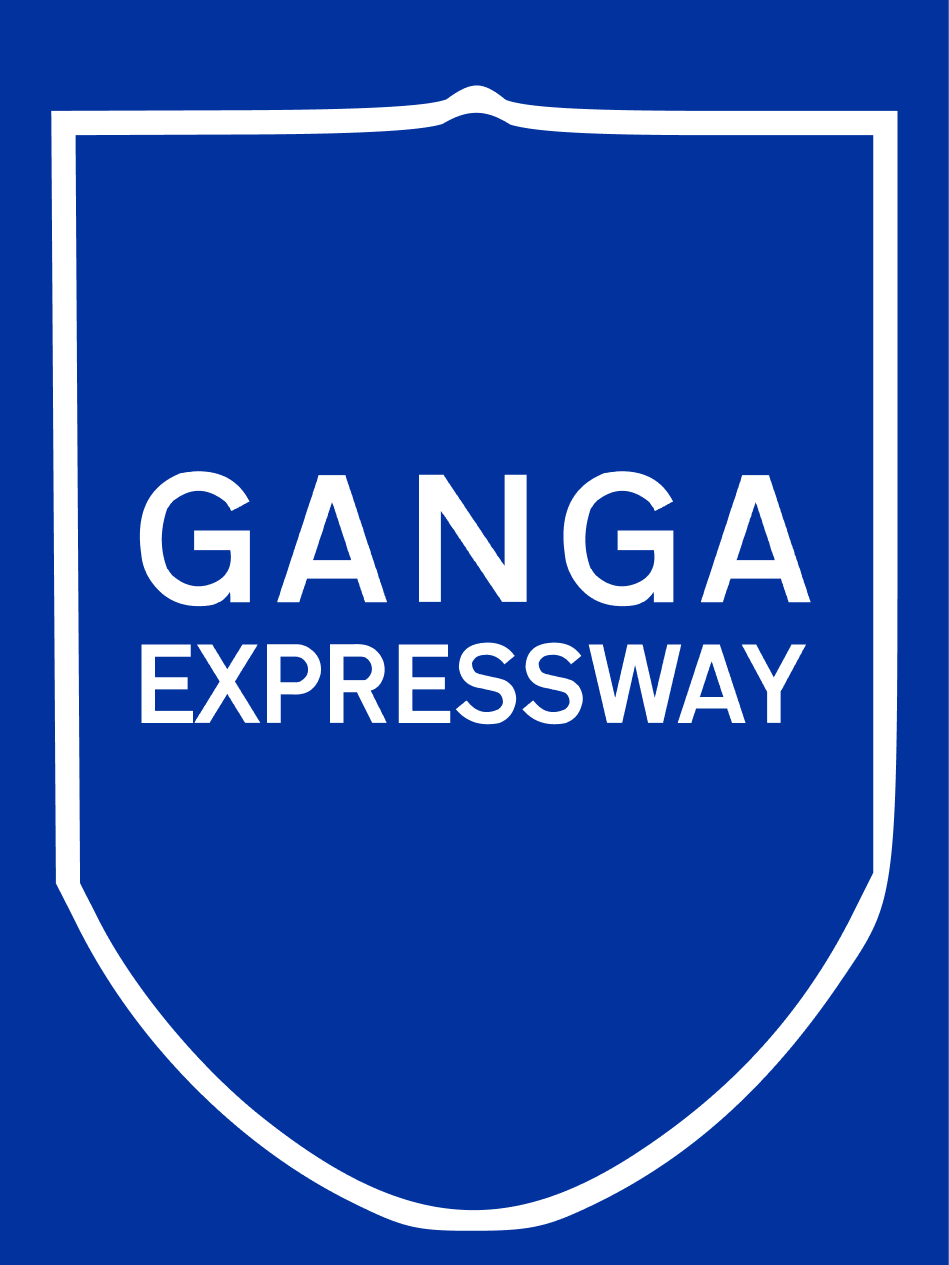
Ganga Expressway
- National Expressway X
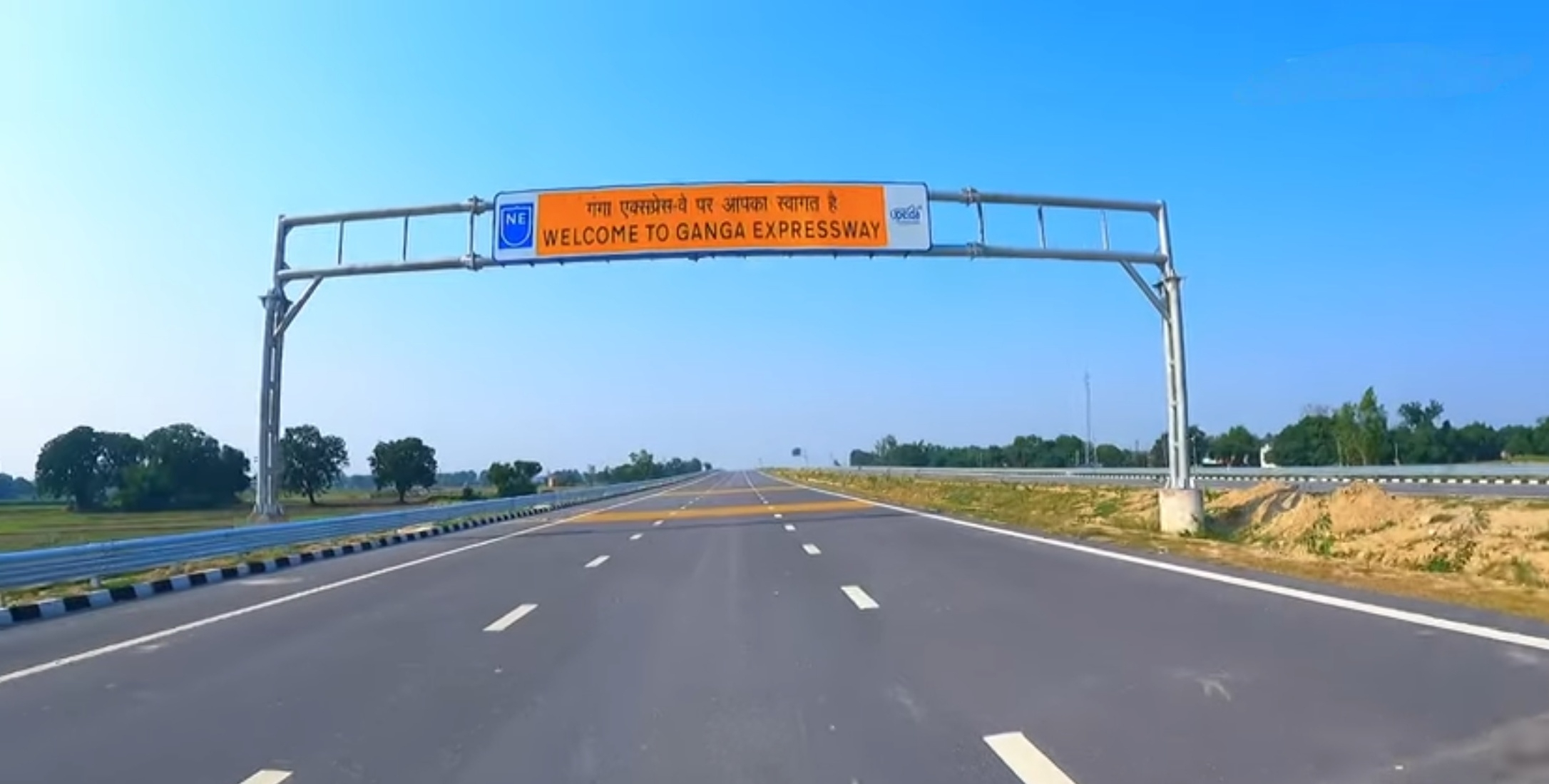
- Ganga Expressway - NE X, Prayagraj, Uttar Pradesh - KM-600

Route information
- Maintained by Uttar Pradesh Expressways Industrial Development Authority (UPEIDA)
- Length: 1,049 km (652 mi)
- Status: Phase 1 Opened
- Existed: 29 April 2026 –present

Major junctions
- West end: NH 334 in Bijauli village, Meerut district
- SH 65 in Bhaina; NH 9 in Singhawali; NH 21 in Binawar; NH 330D in Bilgram; Agra–Lucknow Expressway in Kursath; NH 27 in Unnao; NH 31 in Lalganj; NH 30 in Jagatpur
- East end: NH 19 in Judapur Dandu village, Prayagraj district

Section 1
- Major intersections: Meerut, near Bareilly, near Kanpur and Prayagraj

Section 2
- Major intersections: Haridwar, Varanasi and Ballia

Location
- Country: India
- States: Uttar Pradesh, Uttarakhand
- Major cities: Meerut, Hapur, Bulandshahr, Sambhal, Budaun, Bareilly, Shahjahanpur, Hardoi, Kanpur, Unnao, Raebareli, Pratapgarh, Prayagraj, Mirzapur, Varanasi, Ballia

Highway system
- Roads in India; Expressways; National; State; Asian
← NH 34	→ NH 19

Ganga Expressway or National Expressway X (NE X) is a partially opened 594 km (369 mi) long, 6-lane (expandable to 8 lanes), greenfield National Expressway along the Ganga River connecting eastern and western boundaries of Uttar Pradesh state in India. It constitutes two phases, the completed Phase-1 Meerut-Prayagraj 594 km (369 mi) long, and under-construction Phase-2 (455 km (283 mi) extension entailing Spur-1 Upper Ganges Canal Expressway 110 km from Bulandshahr-Meerut to Haridwar route in the west and Spur-2 314 km Prayagraj-Ballia Expressway route in the east.

== History ==
=== 2007: Conception ===
In 2007, Ganga Expressway was initially proposed by Uttar Pradesh Chief Minister (CM), Mayawati as Greater Noida–Ballia Expressway, but remained stalled.

=== 2019: Project revival ===
In 2019 the project was revived by the Chief Minister Yogi Adityanath, who allocated the first installation of budget of ₹2,000 crores for the construction of Phase-1 in 2020. Uttar Pradesh Expressways Industrial Development Authority (UPEIDA) is the government agency responsible for the project.

=== 2019-2026: Phase-1 construction ===
The total expected project cost in 2021 was ₹37,350 crores, including the land acquisition cost of around ₹9,500 crores. In 2019, the land acquisition commenced and progressed regularly, which was mostly completed by 2021 In 2021 the environmental clearance from Ministry of Environment, Forest and Climate Change was obtained and Uttar Pradesh Cabinet approved ₹36,230 crore budget to build the expressway. On 18 December 2021, after Prime Minister Narendra Modi laid the foundation stone in Shahjahanpur, the construction work started in April 2022.

UPEIDA divided the Phase-1 construction work into 12 packages to be constructed on Design-Build-Finance-Operate-Transfer (DBFOT) Model. The list of Phase-1 contractors is as follows:

Package No.	From	To	Length in km	Contractor
1.	Bijauli (Meerut)	Chandner (Hapur)	48.9	IRB Infrastructure
2.	Chandner (Hapur)	Mirzapur Dungal (Amroha)	30.0	IRB Infrastructure
3.	Mirzapur Dungal (Amroha)	Nagla Baraha (Budaun)	50.7	IRB Infrastructure
4.	Nagla Baraha (Budaun)	Binawar (Budaun)	52.1	Adani Enterprises
5.	Binawar (Budaun)	Dari Gulau (Shahjahanpur)	46.7	Adani Enterprises
6.	Dari Gulau (Shahjahanpur)	Ubariya Khurd (Hardoi)	52.9	Adani Enterprises
7.	Ubariya Khurd (Hardoi)	Iksai (Hardoi)	52.4	Adani Enterprises
8.	Iksai (Hardoi)	Raiya Mao (Unnao)	50.2	Adani Enterprises
9.	Raiya Mao (Unnao)	Sarson (Unnao)	53.1	Adani Enterprises
10.	Sarson (Unnao)	Terukha (Raebareli)	51.8	Adani Enterprises
11.	Terukha (Raebareli)	Naudhiya (Pratapgarh)	52.0	Adani Enterprises
12.	Naudhiya (Pratapgarh)	Judapur Dandu (Prayagraj)	53.0	Adani Enterprises

=== 2025 onwards: Phase-2 construction ===
Phase-2 was approved in January 2025, paving the way for preparation of pre-construction DPR (Detailed Project Report).

== Route ==
=== Phase-1 ===
==== Main route ====
The 594 km long Ganga Expressway Phase-1 alignment, from west to east, is as follows

Ganga Expressway Phase-1 (594 km) alignment: Meerut–Prayagraj
District	Alignment / key locations
Meerut	Bijauli village near Kharkhauda on NH-334
Hapur	Simbhaoli
Bulandshahr	Hingwara; Upper Ganga Canal Expressway begins here; Siana village — crosses the Ganga via Siyana–Rukhalu bridge
Amroha (Jyotiba Phule Nagar District)	Rukhalu village — Ganga crossing via Siyana–Rukhalu bridge
Sambhal	Isapur Sunwari; Chandausi
Budaun	Binawar; Dataganj
Shahjahanpur	Jalalabad
Hardoi	Sandi; Bilgram
Unnao	Unnao city
Raebareli	Dalmau; Unchahar; Balipur
Pratapgarh	Lalganj
Prayagraj	Judapur Dandu village near Soraon on NH-19

==== Spurs ====
- Ganga-Yamuna Expressway (Bulandshahr-Noida Expressway): 74.3 km long, 120 metre wide, Rs 4,000 cr expressway, from Siyana northeast of Bulandshahr on Ganga Expressway to Yamuna Expressway at Pari Chowk in Greater Noida, thus providing connectivity to Noida Airport, Eastern Peripheral Expressway, Western Peripheral Expressway and Delhi-Mumbai Expressway. Land acquisition commenced in 2025.

==== Phase-1 Interchanges ====
The types of interchanges are listed west to east:

Legends: NH is National Highways, SH is State Highways, MDR is Major District Road, and ODR is Other District Road.

Major interchanges along the Ganga Expressway
Highway/Expressway	Location/Description	Type
Delhi–Meerut Expressway	Dummy interchange (direct connectivity)	—
NH-334 (Meerut–Hapur)	Trumpet interchange	Trumpet
NH-24 (Hapur–Garhmukteshwar)	Diamond interchange	Diamond
SH-65 (Bulandshahr–Garhmukteshwar)	Diamond interchange	Diamond
MDR-162W (Hasanpur–Anupshahar)	Diamond interchange	Diamond
ODR (Anupshahr–Moradabad)	Diamond interchange	Diamond
NH-509 (Babrala–Chandausi)	Double Trumpet interchange	Double Trumpet
SH-125 (Chandausi–Budaun)	Diamond interchange	Diamond
SH-33 (Budaun–Bareilly)	Double Trumpet interchange	Double Trumpet
SH-29 (Farrukhabad–Shahjahanpur)	Double Trumpet interchange	Double Trumpet
SH-138 (Farrukhabad–Shahbad)	Diamond interchange	Diamond
SH-21 (Kannauj–Hardoi)	Double Trumpet interchange	Double Trumpet
Agra–Lucknow Expressway	Double Trumpet interchange	Double Trumpet
NH-27 (Kanpur–Lucknow)	Diamond interchange	Diamond
NH-31 (Lalganj–Raebareli)	Double Trumpet interchange	Double Trumpet
NH-30 (Raebareli–Unchahar)	Double Trumpet interchange	Double Trumpet
Yamuna Expressway (via spur to Noida Airport)	—	—

=== Phase-2 ===
==== Main route ====
The Phase-2, of 453 km length, includes the following extensions.

===== Meerut-Haridwar: Upper Ganges Canal Expressway =====
Upper Ganges Canal Expressway (Spur-1 or Hapur Expressway or Bulandshahr-Meerut-Haridwar Expressway): The Government of Uttar Pradesh decided to extend the expressway 110 km northwest i.e. Meerut to Haridwar. At Haridwar it will connect to the Char Dham Highway and Char Dham Railway.

===== Prayagraj-Ballia =====
Prayagraj-Ballia Expressway (Spur-2): 314 eastward extension from Prayagraj to Ballia via Varanasi.

==== Spurs ====
Please help expand this by listing additional spurs off the two planned extensions (Meerut-Haridwar and Prayagraj-Ballia):

==== Phase-2 interchanges ====
Listed west to east (please help expand the partial list):

- Upper Ganges Canal Expressway (Meerut-Haridwar section):
  - Delhi–Dehradun Expressway (Saharanpur-Haridwar Spur)
  - Char Dham Highway
- Prayagraj-Ballia section:
  - Prayagraj-Mirzapur-Bhadohi-Varanasi-Chandauli-Ballia

== Economic use ==
=== Ganga Industrial corridor ===
Area along the Ganga Expressway is being developed as the industrial corridor. New Industries are coming up around Meerut, Baduan, Kanpur, Varanasi and Prayagraj. and there are government plans to setup the pharma parks, textile parks, IT parks along the Ganga Expressway.

- Meerut, In 2023, Uttar Pradesh government acquired the land to set up an industrial city in Meerut, adjacent to entry and exit points of the expressway.
- Kanpur, after the completion of both phases, will serve as a major node for economic and industrial activity, as it will be the central point of the expressway, with many projects planned in the Agra-Lucknow Expressway and Awadh Expressway region.

=== Military airstrip ===
Sections of Ganga Expressway have been constructed to operate as the airstip for the Indian Military. Indian Air Force fighter jets and transport aircraft conducted landing and take-off drills on 2 May 2025 from a 3.5 km (2.2 mi)-long Emergency Landing Facility on the Expressway near Shahjahanpur with several types of aircraft which included Su-30MKI, Mirage 2000, MiG-29, Jaguar, C-130J Super Hercules, An-32, and the Mi-17 V5 helicopter.

== Current status ==
=== Phase-1: Meerut-Prayagraj ===
The Ganga Expressway project, first proposed in 2007, was revived and officially relaunched by Chief Minister Yogi Adityanath on 29 January 2019. Planned to run broadly parallel to the Ganga river while maintaining a 10 km distance to meet environmental norms, the expressway is being executed in phases, with the 594 km Phase-1 connecting Meerut to Prayagraj.

By 2020, ₹2,000 crore was allocated for construction, and land acquisition accelerated through 2021, reaching over 90% by August that year. The project received environmental clearance in November 2021, and Prime Minister Narendra Modi laid the foundation stone on 18 December 2021. Contracts were awarded to Adani Enterprises and IRB Infrastructure, and physical construction began in April 2022.

By late 2023, major groundwork—including clearing, grubbing, and initial earthworks—was largely completed, and the Uttar Pradesh government also announced an industrial city near Meerut, adjacent to the expressway.

As of April 2026, Phase-1 had achieved 100% earthwork, 100% GSB, 100% WMM, 100% DBM in Main Carriageway, and 1,498 of 1,498 structures completed, with overall progress stands at 100%.

Prime Minister Narendra Modi inaugurated the much anticipated expressway on April 29, 2026. With its inauguration the Uttar Pradesh Government is planning to create industrial hubs along the expressway as a part of Industrial corridor in a Hub and Spoke model.

=== Phase 2 ===
Phase-2 includes two spur routes. Spur-1 (Meerut–Haridwar) received a ₹50 crore budget allocation in February 2025 for pre-construction activities. Spur-2 (Prayagraj–Ballia) remains in pre-construction, with surveys completed by UPEIDA in 2024 and preparatory work ongoing as of August 2025.

== See also ==
- Expressways in Uttar Pradesh
  - Ludhiana-Siliguri Industrial Corridor
    - Gorakhpur–Siliguri Expressway
    - Ambala-Shamli Expressway
  - Purvanchal Expressway
  - Bundelkhand Expressway
- Expressways in India
