= Bharouli Khas, Ballia =

Bharouli Khas
- village
- Location in Uttar Pradesh, India. Bharouli Khas (India)
- Coordinates: 25.60225°N 83.98501°E
- Country: India
- State: Uttar Pradesh
- District: Ballia

Government
  - Type: Panchayati raj (India)
  - Body: Gram panchayat

Population (2011)
  - Total: 8,200

Languages
- Time zone: UTC+5:30 (IST)

Bharouli Khas is a village in Ballia district, Uttar Pradesh, India.
