= Chand Saray =

Village in Uttar Pradesh, India

- Village
- Location in Uttar Pradesh, India Chand Saray (India)
- Coordinates: 26.77389°N 81.09237°E
- Country: India
- State: Uttar Pradesh
- District: Lucknow

Area
  - Total: 1.784 km^{2} (0.689 sq mi)
- Elevation: 117 m (384 ft)

Population (2011)
  - Total: 2,222
  - Density: 1,246/km^{2} (3,226/sq mi)

Languages
  - Official: Hindi
- Time zone: UTC+5:30 (IST)
- Vehicle registration: UP-32

Chand Saray, also spelled as Chand Sarai, is a village in Gosainganj block of Lucknow district, Uttar Pradesh, India. It forms the western endpoint of the under construction Purvanchal Expressway. As of 2011, the population of Chand Sarai is 2,222, in 421 households.
