= Bundelkhand Expressway =

Indian highway in Uttar Pradesh

- Bundelkhand Expressway in red

Route information
- Maintained by Uttar Pradesh Expressways Industrial Development Authority (UPEIDA)
- Length: 296.07 km (183.97 mi)
- Existed: 16 July 2022–present

Major junctions
- North end: Kudrail village, Etawah district
- South end: Gonda village, Chitrakoot district

Location
- Country: India
- State: Uttar Pradesh

Highway system
- Roads in India; Expressways; National; State; Asian; State Highways in Uttar Pradesh

Bundelkhand Expressway is a 296 km-long (184-mile), four-lane wide (expandable to six) access-controlled expressway in the state of Uttar Pradesh, India. It connects Gonda village on NH-35 in Chitrakoot district with Kudrail village on Agra–Lucknow Expressway in Etawah district. Prime Minister Narendra Modi laid down the foundation stone of Bundelkhand Expressway on 29 February 2020 in Gonda village, Chitrakoot, and the expressway was inaugurated on 16 July 2022. The expressway will boost tourism to Chitrakoot Dham.

The project was launched in April 2017 by the Chief Minister of Uttar Pradesh, Yogi Adityanath. It is being developed by the Uttar Pradesh Expressways Industrial Development Authority (UPEIDA) with a total project value of ₹14,716 crores.

== Route ==
Bundelkhand Expressway will connect Kudrail village on Agra–Lucknow Expressway in Etawah district with Gonda village on NH-35 in Chitrakoot district. It will pass through 7 districts of Uttar Pradesh i.e. (from north to south) Etawah, Auraiya, Jalaun, Hamirpur, Mahoba, Banda and Chitrakoot.

Following is the route of the expressway from Kudrail village (Etawah) to Chitrakoot Dham:

- east of Bharthana
- west of Phaphund
- west of Auraiya
- west of Jalaun
- south-west of Orai
- north of Rath
- south of Maudaha
- north of Banda
- north-east of Atarra

== Construction ==
The construction work of the 296 km-long (184-mile) Bundelkhand Expressway is divided into six packages and awarded to four different contractors. A total of four railway-over-bridges (ROB), 14 major bridges, 268 minor bridges, 18 flyovers, six toll plazas, seven ramp plazas and 214 underpasses will be constructed on this expressway. Its construction cost is around ₹7,766 crores (excluding the cost of Land). The list of contractors is as follows:

Sr. No	Package	Length in km	Contractor
1.	Gonda (Chitrakoot)–Mahokhar (Banda)	50.5	Apco Infratech
2.	Mahokhar (Banda)–Kaohari (Mahoba)	50.3	Apco Infratech
3.	Kaohari (Mahoba)–Baroli Kharka (Hamirpur)	49.0	Ashoka Buildcon
4.	Baroli Kharka (Hamirpur)–Salabad (Jalaun)	51.0	Gawar Construction
5.	Salabad (Jalaun)–Bakhariya (Auraiya)	50.0	Gawar Construction
6.	Bakhariya (Auraiya)–Kudrail (Etawah)	45.3	Dilip Buildcon

== Status updates ==
- April 2017: Chief Minister of Uttar Pradesh Yogi Adityanath announces plan to build Bundelkhand Expressway.
- Aug 2017: Plan announced to connect the expressway to Agra–Lucknow Expressway via Bateshwar.
- Nov 2017: Work related to route survey is started, which will be followed by preparation of Detailed Project Report (DPR).
- Jun 2018: Due to lack of funds, Government of Uttar Pradesh requests the Government of India to build the expressway.
- Nov 2018: Government of Uttar Pradesh releases ₹ 640 crores for land acquisition.
- Dec 2018: Land acquisition started. The plan is to complete land acquisition in 2 months. Construction work to begin after 80% of the required land is acquired.
- Feb 2019: DPR prepared and 27% of required land has been acquired.
- May 2019: 60% of required land has been acquired. Bidding process to start after Lok Sabha Model Code of Conduct.
- Jun 2019: 79% of required land has been acquired.
- July 2019: ₹ 1,150 crore budget booster given for the expressway.
- Aug 2019: 90% of required land has been acquired. Construction work to start in October 2019.
- Oct 2019: Construction work of the expressway is divided into 6 packages. The government of Uttar Pradesh shortlisted 4 private firms for developing the expressway.
- Jan 2020: The construction work of all 6 packages started by contractors, but, the pace of construction work is going slow in Mahoba district.
- Feb 2020: Prime Minister Narendra Modi laid the foundation of the expressway on 29 February in Chitrakoot. 95% land is acquired, 2% of soil work completed.
- Apr 2020: Road construction work which was halted due to COVID-19, resumes in 3 out of 6 packages.
- Jun 2020: The expressway will pass through 182 villages across 7 districts. 3,483 out of 3,654 hectares (95.32%) of required land has been acquired until 15 June.
- Aug 2020: 14% of construction work completed ahead of schedule.
- May 2021: 90% of the earthworks and 60% of construction work completed. 581 out of total 818 structures completed as of 31 May.
- Aug 2021: 71% of construction work and 704 out of total 880 structures completed as of 31 August.
- Sep 2021: The expressway's section from Etawah to Jalaun is almost completed, and is expected to become operational by December 2021.
- Oct 2021: Uttar Pradesh Expressways Industrial Development Authority (UPEIDA) completes over 73% of construction work of the expressway.
- Jan 2022: 100% of earthwork and 820 structures out of 881 structures are completed, overall 83.30% of construction work of the expressway has been completed.
- April 2022: 92.58% of construction work and 866 out of 881 structures has been completed.
- June 2022: Over 96% of construction work has been completed, and the inauguration date is now scheduled to the second week of July.
- July 2022: Over 98% of construction work has been completed, and the inauguration date is confirmed on 16 July.
- July 2022: On 16 July, Prime Minister Narendra Modi inaugurated the expressway at an event in Jalaun district.

== Controversies ==
Just within five days of inauguration of the expressway, stretches of road caved deep in at different locations during the first rain on 20 July 2022, resulting in accidents of some vehicles. Several videos went viral on social media, with people blaming and questioning the Government for the poor quality and extent of corruption in construction of the expressway.

Former Chief Minister of Uttar Pradesh and SP president Akhilesh Yadav also raised issues, sharing a video showing incomplete, under construction parts of the expressway and stating that the hasty inauguration of the half complete expressway gives rise to ‘Chaltaau’ (passable/sub standard) developmental culture.

== See also ==
- Expressways in India
- Purvanchal Expressway
- Gorakhpur Link Expressway
- Ganga Expressway
- Yamuna Expressway
