= Shaheed Path =

Route information
- Maintained by UPRDA, NHAI
- Length: 23.55 km (14.63 mi)

Major junctions
- south end: Transport Nagar
- east end: Chinhat

Location
- Country: India
- States: Uttar Pradesh
- Major cities: Lucknow

Highway system
- Roads in India; Expressways; National; State; Asian

Shaheed Path is a four lane outer road constructed to divert traffic coming from and going to Kanpur Road or Ayodhya Road to avoid the heavy traffic of the colonial streets and lanes of Lucknow.

== History ==
It was a dream project of former Prime Minister Atal Behari Vajpayee, who represented the Lucknow constituency in the Lok Sabha. It was started in 2001 and was scheduled for completion in 2004, but due to regime change and shortage of funds it got delayed and was finally completed only in 2012.

== Stretch ==
Shaheed Path is 23 km long and is a part of the east-west corridor, connecting Lucknow-Kanpur Road (NH-25) with Lucknow-Ayodhya (NH-28) via Lucknow-Sultanpur Road (NH-56) and Lucknow-Raebareli Road (NH30). The total stretch of the flyover is 22.5 kilometres. The four-lane flyover has a uniform width, and each side of the divider is 8.75 meters wide. It starts from Transport Nagar metro station at Kanpur Road and meets at Chinhat at Ayodhya Road.

== Use ==
It is a four-lane express highway for the traffic from Kanpur Road or Ayodhya Road to go to other highways along the bypass. The flyover has service lanes and under passes at NH-56 and NH-24, linking it to Lucknow-Sultanpur and Lucknow-Rae Bareli national highways respectively. Besides this, the flyover has been connected to various vital localities like Gomtinagar and Gomtinagar extension to allow residents to use the facility accordingly.
