= Udyog Path =

Road around Kanpur, India

The Kanpur Outer Ring Road, also known as Udyog Path, is an under-construction 93-kilometre-long (58 mi) 6 lane access-controlled ring road encircling the city of Kanpur, Uttar Pradesh, India with a speed limit of 120kmph for Light Vehicles and 90kmph for Heavy vehicles.

It will start from Mandhana on Kanpur Aligarh Highway and will pass through Kanpur Jhansi/Agra Highway at Sachendi, Hamirpur Road near Ramaipur Defence Corridor, Allahabad Highway at Maharajpur, from there it will cross Ganga river near Chakeri Airport (where a connecting road is also proposed till Kanpur Airport) and a bridge is also proposed on Ganga River. Then it will reach Unnao district where it will connect Raebareli Highway and under construction Awadh Expressway or Lucknow Kanpur Expressway, further it will pass through Kanpur Lucknow Highway and Trans Ganga City and will again enter Kanpur district by crossing Ganga river between Ganga Barrage and Bithoor and end at Mandhana forming a circle.

This Udyog Path/Outer Ring Road will cost about ₹9,400 crore. On 11 September 2021, NHAI issued notification for acquiring land for 22.5km first phase of ring road. The first phase will be between Mandhana and Sachendi whereby land of 79 villages will be acquired. In total, there will be four phases, and notification for land acquisition of the other 3 phases has been issued.

This Outer Ring Road/Udyog Path will play a major role in the development of the Kanpur Metropolitan Area as many IT cities, Housing Societies, Integrated Mega-Townships, Wellness City, Educational Hubs, and Commercial Hubs, Defence Corridor, Mega Leather Cluster, etc. across multiple thousands of acres of land are proposed to be established around this Ring Road. It is set to offload nearly 4.5 lakh vehicles off the main roads of the city of Kanpur as of now.

All four phases are currently under construction (including two bridges on ganga river)

The deadline for Mandhana-Sachendi phase is January, 2027.

== Status updates ==
- Aug 2019: PWD department have done survey and costing estimates.
- Aug 2020: Uttar Pradesh Government to prepare new alignment and new detailed project report whereby the length of ring road could get shortened.
- June 2021: Project approved by NHAI.
- July 2021: Survey for land acquisition is expected to start from August-end.
- August 2021: Work for making of Detail Project Report started.
- September 2021: Notification for 1st phase land acquisition issued by NHAI.
- August 2024: Work has started on three phases and will begin soon on the last phase after tender finalisation. It is expected to be completed by January, 2027.

== See also ==
- National Highway 230 (India)
