= Agra–Lucknow Expressway =

Longest expressway in India

- Agra Lucknow Expressway in red
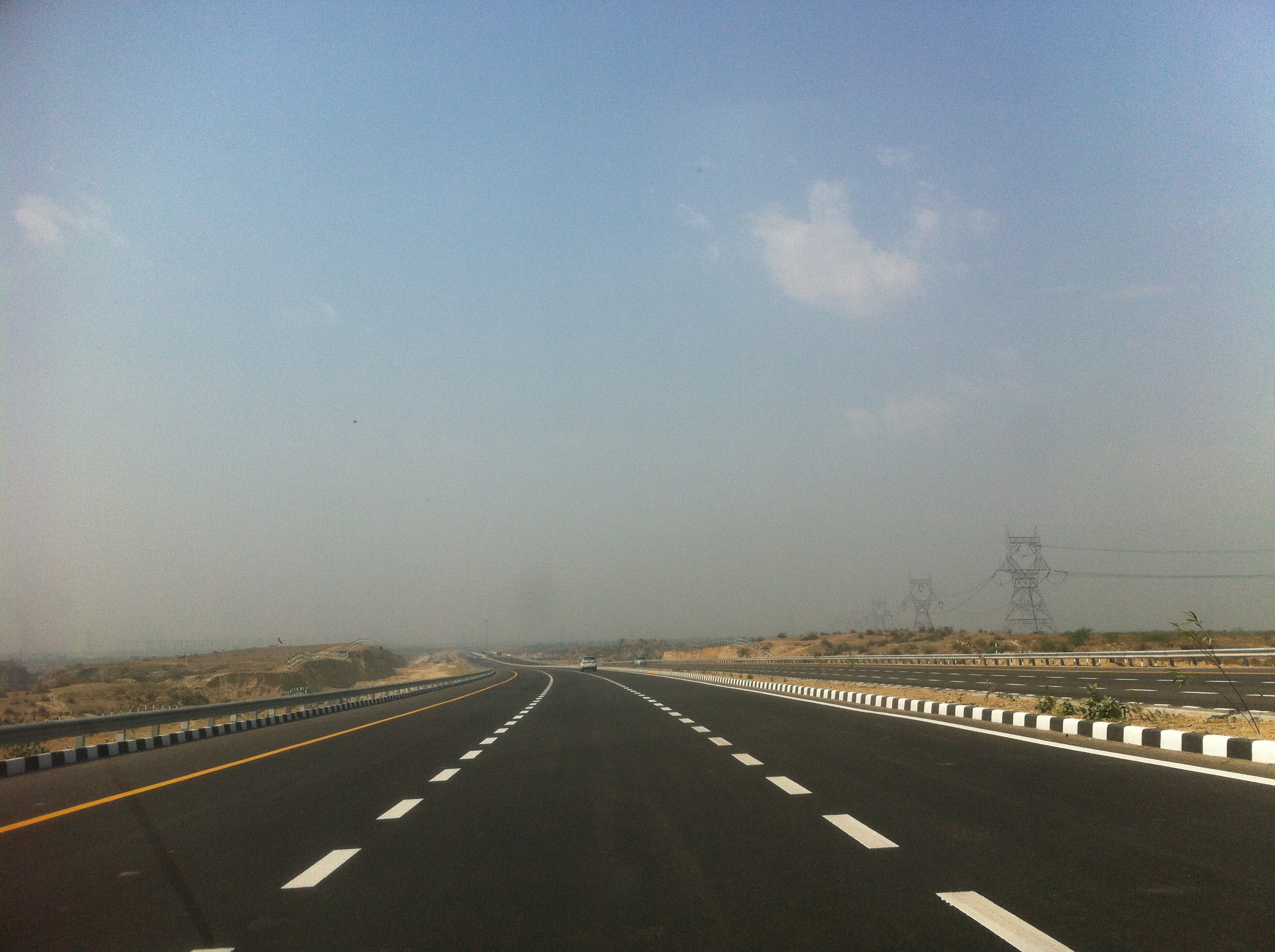
- A section of Agra-Lucknow Expressway

Route information
- Maintained by UPEIDA
- Length: 302.22 km (187.79 mi)
- Existed: 21 November 2016–present

Major junctions
- West end: Hingot Kheria village, Agra district
- List: NH 19 in Kathfori; NH 234 in Chaupula; NH 234 in Kannauj; NH 34 in Araul; NE 10 in Kursath
- East end: SH 40 in Sarosa Bharosa village, Lucknow district

Location
- Country: India
- State: Uttar Pradesh
- Districts: Agra; Firozabad; Etawah; Kannauj; Kanpur Nagar; Unnao; Lucknow

Highway system
- Roads in India; Expressways; National; State; Asian; State Highways in Uttar Pradesh

The Agra–Lucknow Expressway is a 302 km long, 6-lane wide (extendable to 8-lanes) access-controlled expressway constructed by the Uttar Pradesh Expressways Industrial Development Authority (UPEIDA) to reduce traffic in already congested roads and to reduce pollution and carbon footprint. The expressway reduced the distance between the cities of Agra and Lucknow in the Indian state of Uttar Pradesh and is presently one of the India's longest operational expressways.

It was completed and inaugurated on 21 November 2016 by then Chief Minister of Uttar Pradesh, Akhilesh Yadav. It is widely seen as his dream project and the flagship model of development in the state, being the first of its kind to be completed in the shortest span of time.

== Overview ==
The cost of project was expected to be ₹15,000 crore (equivalent to ₹240 billion or US$2.4 billion in 2026) but was completed in ₹13,200 crore (equivalent to ₹210 billion or US$2.2 billion in 2026) and in record time of 22 months. It would cut travel time between Lucknow and Agra from 6 hours to 3:30 hours. The expressway is 6-lane wide (expandable to 8-lane in future) although the structures (major, minor bridges and underpasses) on the expressway are already being constructed as 8-laned to be in tune with the expanded width of the expressway in future. It is proposed on minimum distance and minimal agricultural land formula and was financed by the Government of Uttar Pradesh. The Expressway will carry all public amenities via underpasses, service roads, provision for green belt, rest houses, petrol pumps, service centres, restaurants and four agricultural mandis for dairy, potatoes, grains, fruits and vegetables.

=== Route and exits ===
S.No	Station	Inter-station distance in km	Chainage in km from Agra
1	Agra	0.000	0.000
2	Firozabad	24	24
3	Shikohabad	45	70
4	Etawah	17	87
5	Kannauj	80	165
6	Bangarmau	83	238
7	Lucknow	40	302

This expressway is connected to Yamuna Expressway through the Agra Ring Road, and thus providing an express link between Greater Noida, NCR to Lucknow via Agra. It connects Agra and Lucknow via Shikohabad, Firozabad, Mainpuri, Etawah, Auraiya, Kanpur, Kannauj, Bangarmau and Lucknow. The expressway will start at village Etmadpur Madra near Agra and will end at village Sarosa Bharosa near Mohan Road, Lucknow.

Agra Lucknow Expressway will reduce the distance from Meerut to Lucknow by about 130 km. Ganga Expressway will connect to Agra Lucknow Expressway at Bangarmau. Through the Dimond interchange there, vehicles coming from Meerut will be able to go to Agra Lucknow Expressway. The distance from Kharkhoda Interchange to Bangarmau Interchange will be around 300 km

And from Bangarmau Interchange, where Agra Lucknow Expressway and Ganga Expressway will connect, the distance from Mohan Road Buddheshwar Lucknow is only 60 km.

Agra Lucknow Expressway will also reduce the distance from Noida, Ghaziabad, Delhi to Lucknow Prayagraj And Purvanchal and other North East States Vehicles coming from Noida, Ghaziabad, Delhi will be able to go towards Lucknow and Prayagraj and Purvanchal from the Ganga Expressway interchange to be built on NH 24 in Hapur

=== Rest areas ===
These are given below in direction of travel, as notably different from non-expressway custom, services on one side of the road are only meant for travelers for that side of the direction of travel, so only services created on left of the road are available to travelers, but not the same available while traveling in other direction, usually, a similar set of service is created on other side of road at same spot or within few km. of other side facility.

- Eastbound (Agra to Lucknow) - there are two rest areas while going east:
  - About 100 km from Agra Toll Entrance
  - At 219 km from Agra Toll Entrance
- Westbound (Lucknow to Agra) - these rest areas are available while going west:
  - At 105 km milestone from Lucknow toll entrance.
  - At 205 km milestone from Lucknow toll entrance.

=== Toll rates ===
The toll rates applicable for the Agra Lucknow Expressway (as in December 2025) are shown in the table below:

Vehicle Type (Agra to Lucknow)	Rate (in ₹)
Car, jeep, van or light motor vehicles	655
Light commercial vehicle or mini bus	1,055
Bus and truck	2,075
Heavy construction work machine and multi-axle vehicle (3 to 6)	3,185
Over-sized vehicle (7 and above axles)	4,095
Motorcycles (2-wheeler)	330

== Construction ==
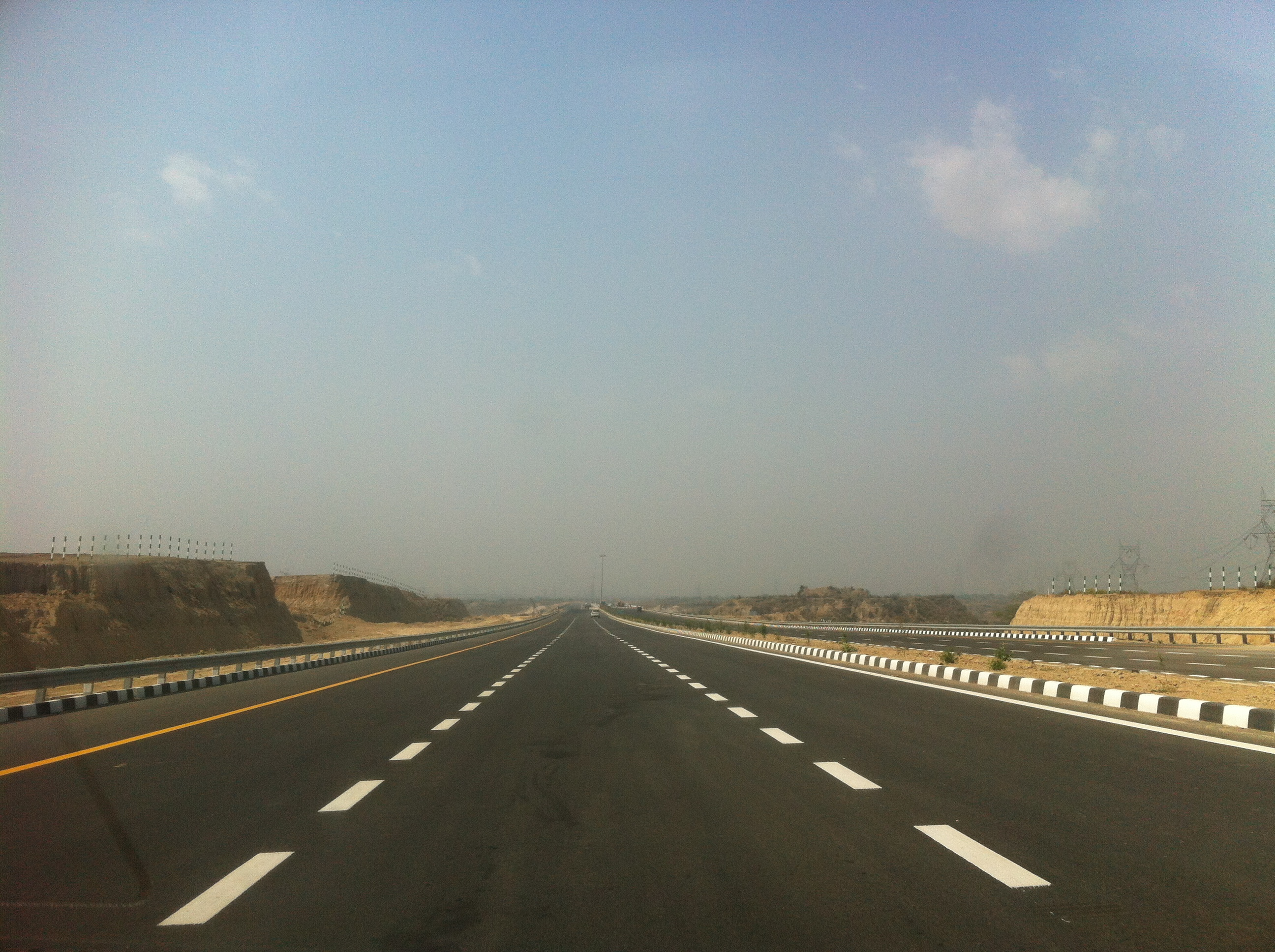
Agra Lucknow Expressway

The construction work of 302 km long Agra–Lucknow Expressway was divided into 5 packages. The list of appointed contractors was as follows:

Sr. No	Package	Length (km)	Contractor
1.	Agra–Firozabad	56	PNC Infratech
2.	Firozabad–Etawah	62	Afcons Infrastructure
3.	Etawah–Kannauj	57	Nagarjuna Construction Company
4.	Kannauj–Unnao	64	Afcons Infrastructure
5.	Unnao–Lucknow	63	Larsen and Toubro

== Greenfield project ==
The Agra–Lucknow Expressway is considered to be a greenfield project as there were no work constraints of existing buildings or infrastructure. Uttar Pradesh Expressways Industrial Development Authority (UPEIDA) purchased almost 3,127 hectares of land without a murmur of dissent and decided to pay four times the circle rates (CR) to the land owners in rural areas and twice the CR in urban parts, as purchase cost. The rest of land was acquired through land acquisition method

== Use as an emergency airstrip ==
Bangarmau Emergency Airstrip (Unnao district) 26.919334°N 80.253053°E

- A group of six fighter jets of the Indian Air Force, comprising Sukhoi Su-30MKI and Dassault Mirage 2000, touched down to perform test runs on Agra-Lucknow expressway on the day of its inauguration.
- According to UPEIDA, "A dedicated 3 km stretch has been built for war-like emergencies on expressway."
- In May 2015, as a first military aviation in the country, IAF successfully landed a French Dassault Mirage-2000 fighter jet on the Yamuna Expressway near Raya village, Mathura, as a part of elaborate trials to see how many other highways can be used for war-like emergencies.
- In Oct 2017, IAF conducted a dedicated exercise and successfully landed/touched down French Dassault Mirage-2000, Sukhoi Su-30MKI, SEPECAT Jaguar, Lockheed C-130J Super Hercules fighter jets.

== Controversy ==
It was alleged that some of the 3,500 hectare of land that was purchased for the route were artificially inflated in price by officials who then received kickbacks from the landowners. Lands that were in fact farmland were listed as residential, which gave them a higher value.

== Status updates ==
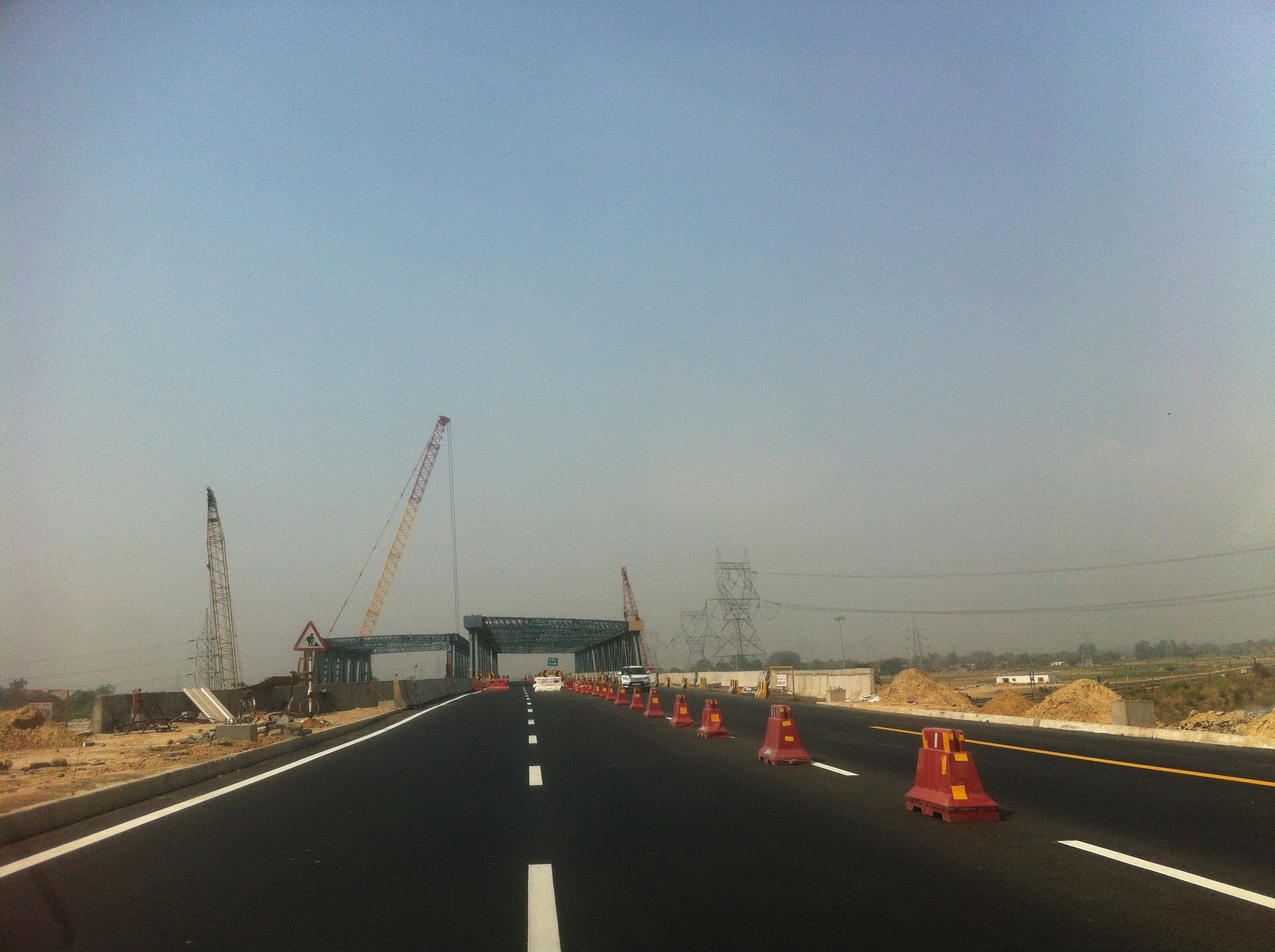
As of early March 2017, one side of the rail over bridge at Bhadan is still under construction

- Nov 2013: No developers bid for this ₹9,000 crore project on a "build, own, operate and transfer" basis. Exclusion of provision for free land parcels across the expressway to developer was the main concern among participating developer companies for keeping them away from project.
- Jun 2014: Government of Uttar Pradesh decided to execute this project through state government financing, rather than private vendor financed basis, without provision for free land parcels across the expressway to developer companies. The Government invited bids in 5 packages for the Agra–Lucknow Expressway. Following this, 24 companies submitted their applications for 5 different patches of the expressway.
- Aug 2014: Through the bidding process developers are finalized who will be executing each of five sections simultaneously.
- Sep 2014: 50% of the land required for the project is already acquired.
- Nov 2014: Foundation stone of Agra–Lucknow Expressway laid on 23 November 2014 by Mulayam Singh Yadav at an event in Hingot Kheria, Agra district. Around 7,000 acres acquired for this 15,000 Crores project. The target for the completion of the project is set to 22 months.
- May 2015: Work on two major bridges on Yamuna and Ganga river started. UP Chief Secretary, Alok Ranjan said that the expressway would be operational by the end of October 2016.
- Nov 2016: The expressway was inaugurated on 21 November 2016 by Chief Minister Akhilesh Yadav.
- Dec 2016: The expressway was partially opened to public from Lucknow till Shikohabad. As of 23 December 2016, only light vehicles were allowed to pass the stretch.
- Feb 2017: The expressway is opened to the public from Lucknow till Agra on 23 February 2017, but still road construction is happening at some places.
- Jan 2018: Toll collection starts by authorities wef 19 January 2018.
- Aug 2018: A 20 metre deep road caved-in at Wazidpur village near Dauki in Agra district. Its contractor, PNC Infratech Ltd., blamed poor maintenance for this accident.

== See also ==
- Expressways in India
- National Highways Development Project
- Purvanchal Expressway
- Awadh Expressway
- Udyog Path
- Kisan Path
- Ganga Expressway
- Eastern Peripheral Expressway
- Western Peripheral Expressway
- Yamuna Expressway (Greater Noida to Agra)
- Highway strip
