= Purvanchal Expressway =

Indian expressway connecting Lucknow and Ghazipur

- Purvanchal Expressway in red

Route information
- Maintained by Uttar Pradesh Expressways Industrial Development Authority (UPEIDA)
- Length: 211.8 mi (340.9 km)
- Existed: 16 November 2021–present

Major junctions
- West end: Chand Saray village, Lucknow district
- East end: Haydaria village, NH-31, Ghazipur district

Location
- Country: India
- State: Uttar Pradesh

Highway system
- Roads in India; Expressways; National; State; Asian; State Highways in Uttar Pradesh

Purvanchal Expressway is a 340.8 km long, 6-lane wide (expandable to 8) access-controlled expressway in the state of Uttar Pradesh, India. The expressway connects Chand Saray village near Gosainganj in Lucknow district with Haydaria village on NH-31 in Ghazipur district. It is developed by the Uttar Pradesh Expressways Industrial Development Authority (UPEIDA). The Purvanchal Expressway has a 3.2 km long airstrip at Akhalkiri Karwat village near Kurebhar in Sultanpur district for emergency landing of aircraft. The construction work was started by the UPEIDA on 10 October 2018 and was inaugurated and opened to the public on 16 November 2021.

The project was announced and laid down by the then Chief Minister of Uttar Pradesh Akhilesh Yadav as Lucknow-Azamgarh-Ballia Samajwadi Purvanchal Expressway in May 2015. Later, route was changed to Lucknow-Azamgarh-Ghazipur by the Yogi Adityanath government, and upon acquisition of around 95% of required land, foundation stone of Purvanchal Expressway was laid on 14 July 2018 by Prime Minister Narendra Modi. With a total project value of ₹22,494 crore, including the land acquisition cost, the Expressway was India's longest expressway at the time of completion.

The expressway is to be linked with Varanasi–Azamgarh highway through a separate link road. UPEIDA is also constructing the Gorakhpur Link Expressway, which will connect Jaitpur village in Gorakhpur district with Purvanchal Expressway at Salarpur village in Azamgarh district. Upon the completion of 17 km long, 4-lane wide Buxar–Ghazipur Elevated Road (Bharauli near Buxar to Haydaria in Ghazipur), Lucknow in Uttar Pradesh will be directly connected to Buxar, Arrah and Patna in Bihar by Purvanchal Expressway and NH-922.

5 industrial corridors will be set up alongside Purvanchal Expressway. As on Nov., 2023, the land has been identified and process for bainama is underway. In Ghazipur district, 25% bainama of land has been done till May, 2024.

In Ghazipur IMLC, 83.89% of Proposed Land has been acquired as on 24.02.2026.

== Route ==
The Purvanchal Expressway connects Chand Saray village near Gosainganj in Lucknow district with Haydaria village on Mohammadabad–Buxar highway (NH-31) in Ghazipur district. It passes through 9 districts of Uttar Pradesh i.e. (from west to east) Lucknow, Barabanki, Amethi, Sultanpur, Ayodhya, Ambedkar Nagar, Azamgarh, Mau and Ghazipur.

=== Entry/ Exits ===
The following entry/exit points are present in the expressway:

Chainage	Intersecting Road No	Details of the Intersecting Road	Project Structure
-0+270	NH 56 (NH731)	National Highway NH56/731	Trumpet Interchange
36+870	SH 13	Haidergarh - Barabanki Road	Slip Roads with toll booth
58+380	SH 31	Inhauna - Rudauli Road	Slip Roads with toll booth
81+900	SH 15	Raebareli - Faizabad Road	Interchange with Toll Plaza
121+860	SH 9	Sultanpur - Faizabad Road	Interchange with Toll Plaza
138+150	NH 232 (NH-128)	Sultanpur - Akbarpur Road	Interchange with Toll Plaza
161	MDR 113E	Akbarpur - Dostpur Road	slip Roads with Toll booth
182+360	SH 5	Akbarpur - Jaunpur Road	Slip Roads with toll booth
191	TRUMPET INTERCHANGE	Gorakhpur Link Expressway	ENTRY AND EXIT POINT
203	SH 124	AHIRAULA-BUDHANPUR ROAD	SLIPS ROAD WITH TOLL BOOTH
234+650	NH 233 (NH-28)	Azamgarh - Tanda Road	Interchange with Toll Plaza
253+850	SH 34	Azamgarh - Mau Road	Slip Roads with toll booth
294+200	SH 34	Mau - Ghazipur Road	Interchange with Toll Plaza
329+500	Ballia Link	Ballia Link Road (future)	Slip Roads with toll booth
340+500	NH 19 (NH-31)	National Highway Road NH19	Trumpet Interchange

== Construction ==
The UPEIDA divided the construction work of 340.8 km long Purvanchal Expressway into 8 packages, which were awarded to 5 different contractors. The design work was done by Egis India Consulting Engineers (Package 1 to 4) and Ayesa India (Package 5 to 8).

22 Flyovers, 7 Railway-over-bridges (ROB), 7 major bridges, 114 minor bridges, 6 Toll Plazas, 45 vehicular-underpasses (VUP), 139 Light VUP, 87 pedestrian underpass and 525 Box culverts has been constructed. Total construction cost (excluding the cost of Land) is around ₹11,216 crores.

Following is the list of contractors:

Sr. No.	Package	Length in km	Contractor
1.	Chand Saray (Lucknow)–Sansara (Barabanki)	40.4	Gayatri Projects
2.	Sansara (Barabanki)–Jarai Kalan (Amethi)	39.7	Gayatri Projects
3.	Jarai Kalan (Amethi)–Siddhi Ganeshpur (Sultanpur)	41.7	Apco Infratech
4.	Siddhi Ganeshpur (Sultanpur)–Sansarpur (Sultanpur)	42.7	GR Infraprojects
5.	Sansarpur (Sultanpur)–Govindpur (Azamgarh)	54.0	PNC Infratech
6.	Govindpur (Azamgarh)–Mojrapur (Azamgarh)	28.2	PNC Infratech
7.	Mojrapur (Azamgarh)–Bijaura (Ghazipur)	46.0	GR Infraprojects
8.	Bijaura (Ghazipur)–Haydaria (Ghazipur)	48.0	Oriental Structural Engineers

== Inauguration ==
Prime Minister Narendra Modi arrived at the inauguration site in the C-130 Hercules and later touch and go exercise was also performed on the expressway by the Indian Air Force (IAF). Indian Air Force fighter jets performed the 'touch and go' operation, under which 30 fighter planes touched the Purvanchal expressway airstrip and then took off. Fighter jets including Mirage 2000, AN-32, Jaguar, and Sukhoi performed touch and go operations and showcased a landing on the expressway. The Indian aircraft showcased tricolor in the sky.

== Delhi–Lucknow–Patna connectivity ==
The Purvanchal Expressway is a part of Government of Uttar Pradesh's initiative to connect Lucknow with Ghazipur in order to improve transportation facilities and trade & commerce activities in East UP and Bihar. Upon the completion of 4-lane wide Buxar–Ghazipur Elevated Road (Bharauli near Buxar to Haydaria in Ghazipur), people can also travel from New Delhi to Patna in Bihar via Agra and Lucknow in Uttar Pradesh by using following route:

Sr. No.	Name of Road	from	to	Distance in km
1	DND Flyway	New Delhi	Noida	6.0
2	Noida–Greater Noida Expressway	Noida	Greater Noida	24.5
3	Yamuna Expressway	Greater Noida	Agra	165.5
4	Agra Ring Road	Kuberpur (Agra)	Hingot Kheria (Agra)	~10
5	Agra–Lucknow Expressway	Agra	Lucknow	302.2
6	Lucknow Ring Road	Sarosa Bharosa (Lucknow)	Chand Saray (Lucknow)	40
7	Purvanchal Expressway	Lucknow	Ghazipur	340.8
8	Ghazipur–Buxar Elevated Road	Ghazipur	Buxar	17.0
9	Buxar–Arrah–Patna (NH-922) (Including the entire stretch of the upcoming Danapur-Bihta Elevated Road)	Buxar	Patna	125.0

Note: Union Minister Nitin Gadkari announced on 28 August 2021 that the Government of India will construct Ghazipur–Arrah–Patna Expressway at an event in Arrah, Bihar.

== Status updates ==
- May 2015: Uttar Pradesh Chief Minister Akhilesh Yadav announces intention to take up the Lucknow-Ballia Expressway soon.
- Oct 2015: Government of UP finalized the alignment out of three proposed alignment for expressway. Detailed Project Report (DPR) to be prepared in three months.
- Nov 2015: The Lucknow–Azamgarh–Ballia Expressway renamed as Purvanchal Expressway.
- Feb 2016: State Government allocated ₹1,500 crores for the expressway in the budget.
- Dec 2016: Akhilesh Yadav, then Chief Minister of Uttar Pradesh lays foundation stone of Lucknow-Azamgarh-Ballia Expressway on 22 December 2016.
- Mar 2017: Yogi Adityanath of BJP became the new Chief Minister of Uttar Pradesh on 19 March 2017.
- May 2017: Yogi Adityanath government cancels tenders issued by the previous Akhilesh Yadav government, stating that currently only 40.17% of needed land is acquired. The fresh tenders will be issued, when at least 80% of the required land will be acquired. UP Government orders faster land acquisition.
- Sep 2017: 60% land acquired at cost of ₹4,500 crore. Total land acquisition may cost up to ₹6,500 crore. NITI Aayog says the Central Government may bear construction cost, if UP government bears the land acquisition cost.
- Jan 2018: 85% land acquisition done, foundation stone to be laid in March 2018.
- Apr 2018: 91% land acquired. Request for Proposal (RFP) document floated.
- Jul 2018: On 14 July 2018, Prime Minister Narendra Modi laid the foundation stone of Purvanchal Expressway (Lucknow-Azamgarh-Ghazipur Expressway) at Azamgarh. Tender awarded for road construction to 5 firms for 8 packages.
- Oct 2018: Construction work started on 10 October for Package 2 to 8.
- Nov 2018: Construction work started by Gayatri Projects on 24 November for Package-1.
- Feb 2019: The Government of Uttar Pradesh allocated ₹1,194 crores in UP Budget 2019.
- Jun 2019: Government of Uttar Pradesh saves ₹620 crore in bidding process for Purvanchal Expressway. 10% of construction work has been completed.
- Jul 2019: Proposal to extend the Purvanchal Expressway to Ballia.
- Sep 2019: 97% of earth work completed. To check the progress of construction work without physical inspection, UPEIDA to launch mobile app soon.
- Oct 2019: 20% of construction work is completed.
- Apr 2020: Work resumed after being on-hold for nearly a month due to COVID-19.
- Aug 2020: 52% of construction work completed, as of 10 August.
- Jun 2021: 90% of construction work and 928 out of total 934 structures completed as of 28 June.
- Jul 2021: 95% of construction work and 930 out of total 934 structures completed as of 26 July. The deadline for construction work is October 2021.
- Aug 2021: Union Minister Nitin Gadkari announced on 28 August 2021 that the Government of India will construct Ghazipur–Arrah–Patna Expressway at an event in Arrah, Bihar.
- Sep 2021: On 10 September, CM Yogi Adityanath confirmed to inaugurate the expressway in October 2021. 97% of construction work completed as of 20 September.
- Nov 2021: The expressway was inaugurated by Prime Minister Narendra Modi on 16 November at an event in Sultanpur district.
- May 2022: Toll collection starts at all Toll Plazas with effect from 1 May 2022.

== Controversies and Criticism ==
The first seasonal rains in October 2022 caused wide stretches of road caving deep in, some extending to even 15 feet deep. Accidents were reported at several places, with multiple injuries and damage to numerous cars garnering significant coverage in media. The much proclaimed dream project of Yogi Adityanath, built over a whopping 22000 crore expense by the Yogi government and inaugurated by Prime Minister Narendra Modi in November 2021, faced subsequent backlash and criticism for the alleged irregularities and corruption in construction of the expressway which couldn't withstand the first few hours of rain within a year following its inauguration.

== See also ==
- Delhi–Noida Direct Flyway
- Yamuna Expressway
- Agra–Lucknow Expressway
- Ganga Expressway
- Bundelkhand Expressway
- Gorakhpur Link Expressway
- Danapur-Bihta Elevated Road
- Delhi–Mumbai Expressway
- Expressways in India
