= Bharauli, Bhojpur =

Bharauli
- village
- Location in Uttar Pradesh, India. Bharauli (India)
- Coordinates: 25.63506°N 84.37600°E
- Country: India
- State: Uttar Pradesh
- District: Bhojpur

Government
  - Type: Panchayati raj (India)
  - Body: Gram panchayat

Population (2011)
  - Total: 5,432

Languages
- Time zone: UTC+5:30 (IST)

Bharauli is a village in Balia district, Uttar Pradesh.
