= Lucknow Outer Ring Road (NH 230) =

Lucknow Outer Ring Road

National Highway 230
- Lucknow outer ring road in red
- Schematic map of National Highways in India

Route information
- Length: 104 km (65 mi)
- Existed: 2023-06–present

Major junctions
- From: Bakshi ka Talab
- NH-27 / NH-731 / NH-30 / NH-27
- To: Bakshi ka Talab

Location
- Country: India
- States: Uttar Pradesh
- Primary destinations: Chinhat

Highway system
- Roads in India; Expressways; National; State; Asian
| ← NH 30 | → NH 30 |

National Highway 230 (NH 230), also known as Kisan Path or Lucknow Outer Ring Road, is National Highway in Uttar Pradesh, India which also includes sections of Lucknow Inner Ring Road. The Lucknow outer ring road is an 8 lane that expand to 10 lanes at key junctions and 104 km long quadruple carriageway (2*4 lanes) road project with a speed limit of 100kmph for Light Vehicles and 80kmph for Heavy vehicles. The 6 lane 11 km long stretch between Kursi Road to Sultanpur road (Kisan Path) has been constructed by the NHAI. This Ring Road has multiple 6 lane flyovers for smooth and swift commuting of the travellers. This Outer Ring Road will play a major role in the establishment of the Lucknow State Capital Region or the Uttar Pradesh State Capital Region as many IT cities, Housing Societies, Integrated Mega-Townships, Wellness City, Educational Hubs, and Commercial Hubs etc. across Multiple thousands of acres of land are proposed to be established around this Ring Road. It is set to offload nearly 1.60 lakh vehicles off the main roads of the city of Lucknow as of now.

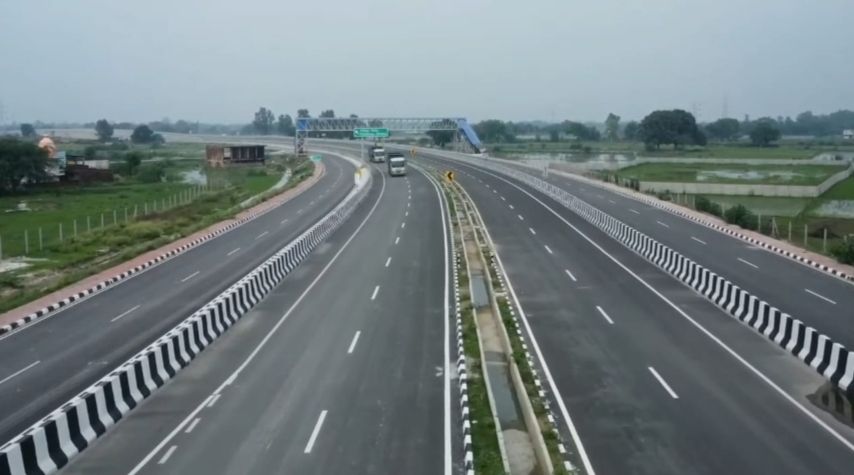
8 lane Lucknow ORR quadruple Carriageway (2*4 Lanes).

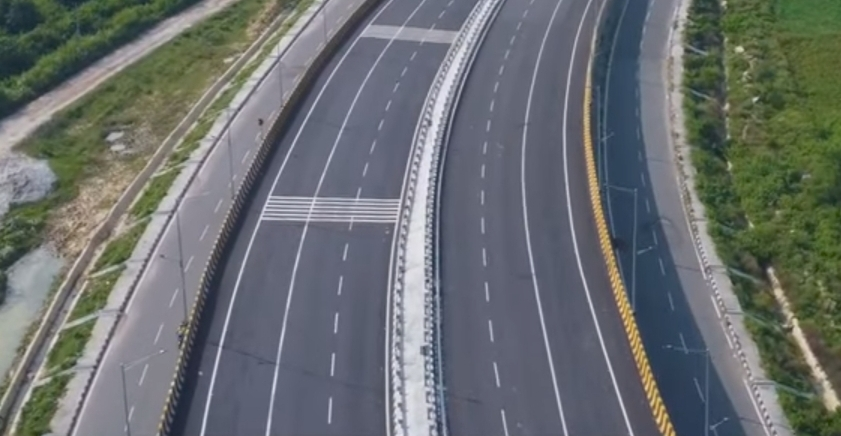
Lucknow ORR 8 lane quadruple Carriageway Drone view.

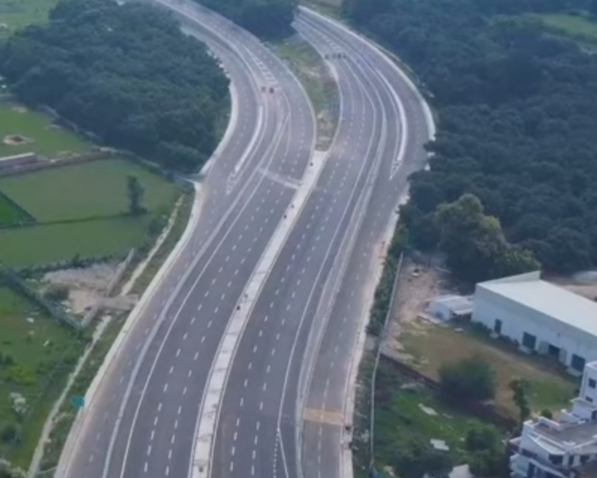
6 lane Kisan Path between Sultanpur Road and Ayodhya Road, Lucknow.

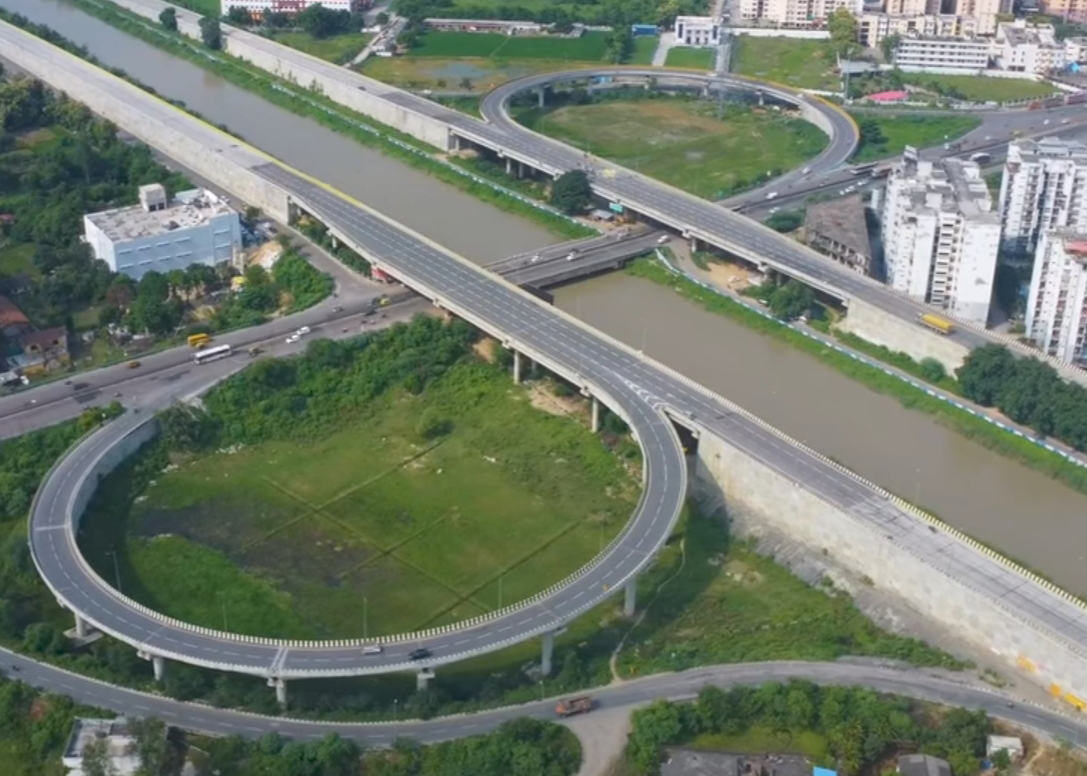
6 lane Kisan Path Cloverleaf Interchange at Ayodhya Road, Lucknow.

== Construction ==
The NHAI had divided the construction work of Lucknow outer ring road (NH-230) under 2 Phases into multiple packages.

- Phase - 1

The first phase included the development from Bakshi Ka Talab (BKT) to Asti Road, Sultanpur Road, Behta Road, Sitapur Road, Kursi Road, Ayodhya Road, Indira Canal, Mohanlalganj and Kanpur Road near Daroga Khera.

| Sr. No. | Package | Length in km | Contractor |
|---|---|---|---|
| 1. | Sultanpur road to Behta road | 31.75 | PNC Infratech |
| 2. | Behta road to Sitapur road | 32.89 | |
| 3A. | Sitapur road to Kursi road | 14.62 | DRA Infracon |
| 3B. | Kursi road to Faizabad road | 14.70 | DRA Infracon |

- Phase - 2

In the second phase, construction was carried out from Daroga Khera on Kanpur Road to BKT via Mohan and Kakori Road.

== Status updates ==
- Mar 2019: 15 km of the road project was completed and inaugurated.
- May 2020: Work on rest of road project progressing.
- Oct 2020: Outer ring road to be ready by December 2021.
- Oct 2021: Work on the remaining 76 km of outer ring road is progressing and is expected to be completed by June 2022.
- Feb 2022: After six months the ring road is ready, with the work going very fast. Earthworks from Agra Expressway to Hardoi Road have almost been completed.
- Mar 2024: Inauguration of completed parts with a patch from Mohan Road to BKT still inoperative. Construction for the patch is almost complete and should be operational within a few months.

== See also ==
- List of national highways in India
