= Driving in India =

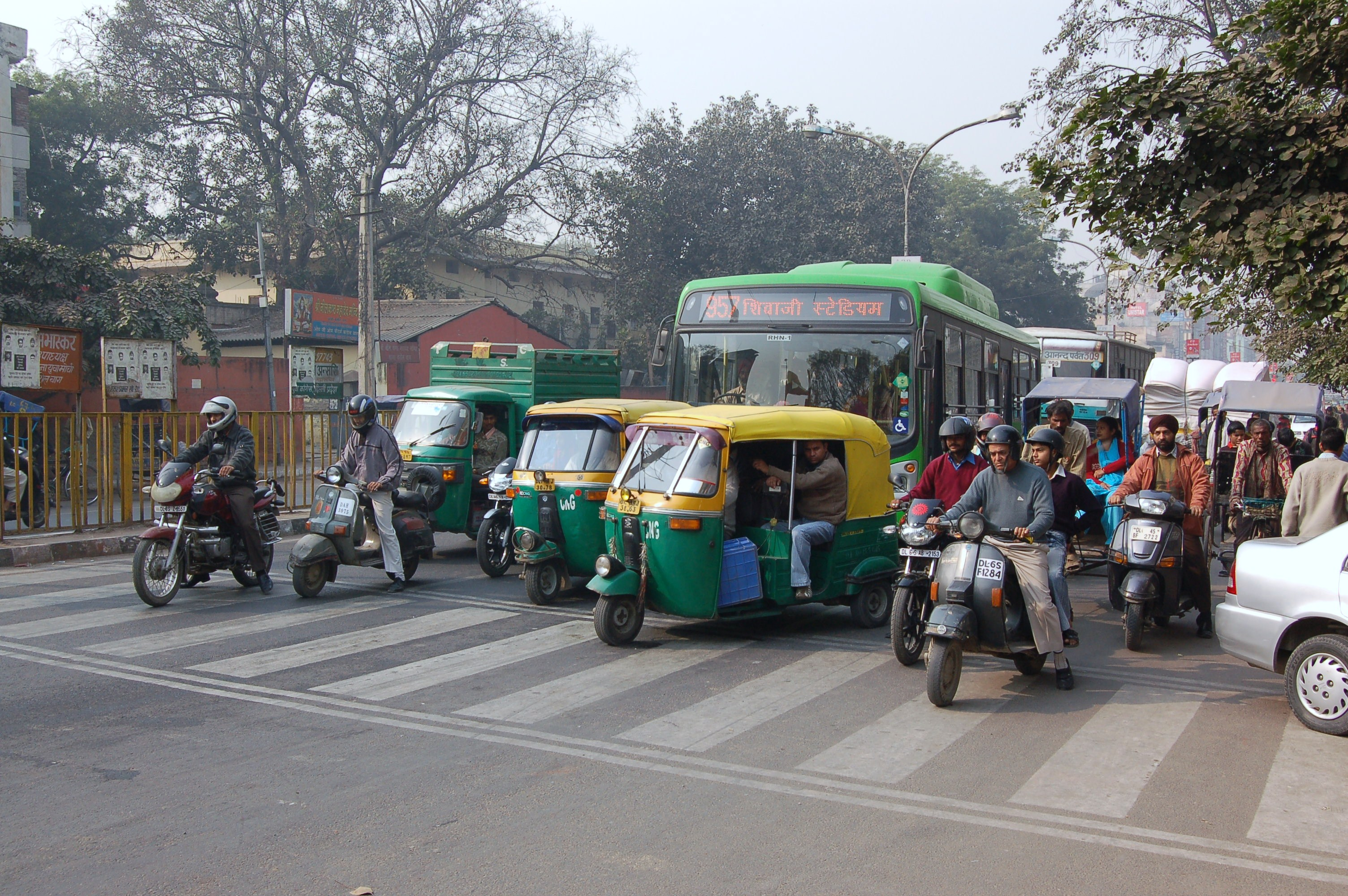
A variety of vehicles waiting at a junction in Delhi

Driving in India is governed by various legal powers and in some cases is subject to the passing of a driving test. The Ministry of Road Transport and Highways, a branch of the Government of India, is the apex body for formulation and administration of the rules, regulations and laws relating to road transport, national highways and transport research, in order to increase the mobility and efficiency of the road transport system in India. Indian traffic drives on the left.

== Highway Safety Code ==
Indian Roads Congress (IRC) had published a Highway Safety Code [IRC publication code IRC:SP:44-1996]. In the publication, it states that "this code is not a manual of traffic law, although some of the measures dealt within it are prescribed by Law. Others are dictated by good sense and courtesy. However, each category is as important as the other". This book is created based on the recommendations of First Highway Saferty workshop help at Chandigarh in January 1972. Copyrights of this book is owned by Indian Road Congress. This book consists of a number of chapters covering various types of road users. Road users explicitly covered are Pedestrians, Animal Drawn Vehicles, Cyclists, Motor Cyclists and other Motorised vehicles. Unlike a few other countries, this book is not available on retail stores for sales to purchase, and is sold through IRC only.

== Speed limits ==
Road speed limits in India are defined by the road types and Vehicle category. As per section 112 of The Motor Vehicles Act, 1988, Central government of India has power to notify the minimum and maximum speed limits at national level where as similar power is granted to Indian State governments or their nominated agency has power to notify speed limits under their jurisdiction.

Until 2014, there was no national upper speed limit for cars in India, as local police set the limits in their own areas. Local governments are still encouraged to set specific limits within their own jurisdiction.

Below are the latest Maximum speed limited defined by the Government of India on 6 April 2018.

Maximum speed in kilometers per hour on roads in India						
S. No.	Class of Motor Vehicles	Expressway with Access Control	4 lane and above divided carriageway (roads with Median strips/Dividers)	Road within Municipal Limits	Other Roads	Near Schools, Construction Site, Hospitals and on roads without footpaths and soft shoulders where pedestrians use a part of the carriageway to walk.
(1)	(2)	(3)	(4)	(5)	(6)	(7)
1.	Motor vehicles used for carriage of passengers comprising not more than eight seats in addition to the driver’s seat (M1 category vehicles)	120	100	70	70	25
2.	Motor vehicles used for carriage of passengers comprising nine or more seats in addition to the driver’s seat (M2 and M3 category Vehicles)	100	90	60	60	25
3.	Motor vehicles used for carriage of goods (All N category vehicles)	80	80	60	60	25
4.	Motor Cycles	80*	80	60	60	25
5.	Quadricycle	-	60	50	50	25
6.	Three wheeled vehicles	-	50	50	50	25
* If permitted to ply on Expressway.						

== Pedestrian crossings ==
There are two broad categories of pedestrian crossing to aid the safe passage across major roads by those travelling on foot.

- Traffic light controlled crossings: Drivers are controlled by traffic light signals.
- Zebra crossings: Black and white stripes are painted on the road. Drivers must give way to pedestrians on the crossing.

== Driving licence ==
Driving licences may be obtained by any citizen of age 18 or above, subject to certain conditions. Initially, a provisional licence is issued, which restricts the holder to driving whilst accompanied by a driver who has held a full licence in the category of vehicle they are supervising the learner driver. The provisional licence may be exchanged for a full licence after the holder has passed the driving test. On reaching the age of 50, drivers may apply to have their licences renewed with a medical/fitness certificate. Many foreign driving licences permit one to drive in India for a period of one year.

== Enforcement ==
Enforcement of traffic rules in India is primarily through monetary penalties ("challans") for specific offences, with the Motor Vehicles (Amendment) Act, 2019 significantly increasing fines for violations such as driving without a licence, drunk driving, not wearing a helmet or seat belt, and overspeeding. Many states now use an electronic challan (e-challan) system and automated cameras to record violations; in cities such as Bengaluru, an Intelligent Traffic Management System (ITMS) with AI-enabled automatic number plate recognition (ANPR) cameras is used to issue fines for offences like helmet non-compliance, red-light jumping and overspeeding. A national penalty-points framework to link repeated violations to licence suspension (for example, suspension after accumulating 12 points within three years) has been proposed, but implementation varies across states and is still evolving.

== Fatalities ==
India is generally considered to be one of the most dangerous countries in the world in which to drive. Road accidents claimed 150,000 lives in India in 2021 - an average of 17 per hour. A representative of Delhi's Institute of Road Traffic Education suggested that among the main causes were the lack of traffic management, "We do not design traffic management systems to separate different streams", and poor driver training. A 2014 article published by Reuters described a driving test in Delhi, which lasted less than two minutes, and involved one examiner testing ten people at the same time. Peter Foster, a journalist for The Daily Telegraph, recounted that in his experience, fellow drivers paid little heed to the rules of the road, and did anything they could to avoid queueing; succeeding in blocking up more of the road. The wide variety of methods of transportation, and what is often portrayed as a common disregard for the rules of the road, contribute to the fatalities.

== See also ==
- Roads in India
- Speed limits in India
- Road signs in India
