= Driving licence in India =

- Type: Driving Licence
- Issued by: District level Regional Transport Officer of respective States and Union Territories
- First issued: 1939
- Purpose: Driving a motor vehicle Identification
- Valid in: India
- Eligibility: Indian Citizen; 18 years of age or older; Should pass the Driving Test
- Expiration: 20 Years (before 2010) until the age of 40; 10 Years (between 40 and 65 years of age); 5 Years (65 years of age or older)
- Cost: Cost may vary
- Website: Official Website

In India, a driving licence is an official document that authorises its holder to operate various types of motor vehicles on highways and some other roads to which the public has access. In various Indian states, they are administered by the Regional Transport Offices/Authorities (RTO/RTA). A driving licence is required in India by any person driving a vehicle on any highway or other road defined in the Motor Vehicles Act, 1988. This act sets limits on the minimum age for vehicle operation ranging from 16 to 20, depending on specific circumstances. A modern photo of the driving licence can also serve many of the purposes of an identity card in non-driving contexts, such as proof of identity (e.g. when opening a bank account) or age (e.g. when applying for a mobile connection).

== Background ==
Application for a provisional driving licence can be made from the age of 16. Provisional licences allow the holder to drive a moped or gearless motorcycle from age 16, or a motorcycle/scooter with manual transmission, three wheeler, car, or any motor vehicle with a maximum of four wheels and less than 7500 kilograms, from age 18. Licenses issued by one RTO allows the licensee to drive throughout the country. This permits the holder to drive non-transports vehicle (white registration plates with black letters; green registration plates with white letters for electric vehicles) or self-drive vehicles (black registration plates with yellow letters.)

For driving commercial vehicles with any tyre count or weight (yellow registration plates with black letters; green registration plates with yellow letters for electric vehicles), one should obtain an endorsement (and a minimum age of 20 years, in some states) in the driving licence to effect under s.3(1) of The Motor Vehicles Act, 1988. Until a driving test—consisting of a verbal or written test (depending on the state), a road sign test, and a supervised driving examination—has been passed, a driver may hold only a provisional licence and is subject to certain conditions:

- L-plates must be conspicuously displayed on the front and rear of the vehicle.
- Learner drivers of a particular category and transmission type of vehicle must be accompanied by somebody who has held a full driving licence for that category and transmission type, except in the case of solo motorcycles and vehicles of certain categories designed solely for one person.
- Motorcycle riders must not carry any passengers on the pillion.
- Bus drivers must not carry any passengers except a person giving or receiving instruction.

Anyone applying for a driving licence for the first time has to apply for a learner licence (LLR) as a prerequisite. Holders of a learner's permit are only permitted to drive while under a licensed driver's supervision.

After passing a driving test, the provisional licence must be surrendered in exchange for a full licence for the relevant kind of vehicle. Depending on state-specific laws, full car licences allow use of mopeds, motorcycles, three-wheelers and cars.

A licence is valid until the age of 40 if the holder applied before 30 years of age. Between 30 and 50 years of age, it is valid for 10 years. From 50 to 55 years of age, it is valid until the holder's 60th birthday. Above 55 years of age, it is valid for 5 years under the Motor Vehicles (Amendment) Act, 2019. The driving licence is required to be renewed after the expiry of its validity. It previously had 20 years of validity.

Applications for driver's licences in India can be submitted online or in person. The website is known as the Parivahan Seva. Assistance in applying for a driver's licence can be sought at government-authorized driving-licence-issuing centers.

== Testing ==
Tests on basic driving rules are conducted at the RTOs when an individual applies for a provisional licence. This test consists of basic road sign questions, which are the same for car and motorcycle tests:

- Multiple-choice questions. At least nine questions should be answered correctly to pass this section. The test can also consist of up to 20 additional questions, of which the applicant must get at least 14 questions correct.
- Verbal or written test (depending on the state).

The basic test is completed on a computer, and both sections must be passed in order to pass.

== Driving licence categories ==
This is a list of the categories that might be found on driving licences in India.

- MC 50CC (Motorcycle 50cc) — motorcycles with an engine capacity of up to 50cc.
- MC EX50CC (Motorcycle more than 50cc) — motorcycles, light motor vehicle, and cars.
- Motorcycles/Scooters of any engine capacity, with or without gears with an engine capacity of 50cc or more (old category).
- MC Without Gear or M/CYCL.WOG (Motorcycle Without Gear) — motorcycles, scooters without gears.
- MCWG or MC With Gear or M/CYCLWG (Motorcycle With Gear) — motorcycles, engine capacity more than 175cc.
- LMV-NT (Light Motor Vehicle—Non Transport) — for personal use only.
- LMV-INVCRG-NT (Light Motor Vehicle—Invalid Carriage Non Transport) — for personal use by physically handicapped persons only.
- LMV-TR (Light Motor Vehicle—Transport) — for commercial transportation, including light goods carrier.
- LMV (Light Motor Vehicle) — including cars, jeeps, taxis, delivery vans (16th Apr 2018 GOI Ministry of Road Tran & Highways No. RT-11021/44/2017-MVL).
- LDRXCV (Loader, Excavator, Hydraulic Equipment) — for commercial application of all hydraulic heavy equipment if state RTO provides.
- HMV (Heavy Motor Vehicle) — a person holding an LMV driving licence can only apply for a heavy licence.
- HPMV (Heavy Passenger Motor Vehicle).
- HTV Heavy Transport Vehicle (Heavy Goods Motor Vehicle, Heavy Passenger Motor Vehicle).
- TRANS (Heavy Goods Motor Vehicle, Heavy Passenger Motor Vehicle & Any type of Trailer).
- AGTLR (Agricultural Tractor and Power Tiller) — A person holding an AGTLR can drive an agricultural tractor and power tiller on farms, local roads, some Major District Roads and some highways without a trailer (most of the highways are restricted for farm machinery and slow-moving equipment, some jurisdictions have different rules, so the operator need to go through the concerned authority).
- Additional Endorsement of Driving licence — (AEDL) Private/Commercial drivers should have an additional badge if they are driving a taxi or any other public transport vehicle.
- IDL (International Driving licence) — Driving licence permit to be made separately to ride or drive abroad. This Indian licence is valid in the listed countries. In places where the IDL is not accepted, one must take that nation's test before driving there.
- Excavator/ Hydraulic Equipments — can get licence from Skill India or Ministry of Labour or Private agencies

In order to drive a vehicle carrying hazardous goods, the driver must have an additional Hazardous Goods endorsement, in addition to a transport-, or LMV-class licence.

To drive a motor vehicle in hilly terrain or a ghat section the driver needs a Hill Driver endorsement.

Most of the legislation regarding licensing is in the Rules of the Road Regulation and the Motor Vehicles Act, 1988.

== Obligation to carry and produce ==
Drivers are legally obliged to carry a valid driving licence while driving. Under S.130 of the Motor Vehicles Act, 1988, a police officer or any other official authorised by the government can ask for vehicle-related documents, and the driver should produce them within 15 days at the police station (or the concerned department).

== Violations and punishments ==
The law permits officials to seize a licence, and issue a temporary one for a specified time. The law also allows the state government to set fines or prison terms for minor traffic violations, and specifies who has the rights to enforce these rules.

Every driving licence has a maximum number of endorsements allowed. If the driver does not follow the traffic rules or causes any fault, then a penalty fine is issued and an endorsement put on the licence. An excessive number of endorsements may lead to cancellation.

India uses a cumulative points systems for offenders, which is broadly similar, but different in detail, to those in different countries.

Points are given for driving offenses by law courts, and the licence is endorsed accordingly. An Indian driving licence may be endorsed by the courts for various offences, not only for those committed whilst driving or in charge of a vehicle. If the individual committing the offence does not hold a valid driving licence the driver may be subject to imprisonment of up to 3 months. Violation of traffic signals, triple driving on motorcycle/scooter/two-wheeler, using vehicles without registration or in unsafe condition may acquire 3 negative points in each case.

In the case of two-wheelers, helmet laws are mandatory for both the main rider and the pillion rider. Offences such as for drunk or drugged driving are recorded on the licence; and the offender is prosecuted and liable to being imprisoned.

Twelve points on the licence makes the driver liable to cancellation/suspension of the driving licence for one year; accumulation of twelve points for the second consecutive time would lead to suspension of the driving licence for five years.

== See also ==
- Driving in India
- Speed limits in India
- Road signs in India
