= Street Signs =

Street Signs may refer to:

- Street signs, traffic signs for informing drivers
  - Road signs in India
- Street Signs (TV series), a CNBC business television programme
- Street Signs (album), a 2004 album by Ozomatli
- Traffic Signal (film), a 2007 Indian film
