= Nachuni =

Village in Odisha, India

Nachuni ନାଚୁଣୀ
- Village
- Location in Odisha, India
- Coordinates: 19.8386°N 85.3228°E
- Country: India
- State: Odisha
- District: Khordha
- Block: Banapur

Government
  - Type: Panchayati raj
- Time zone: UTC+5:30 (IST)
- PIN: 752034
- STD code: 06756
- Vehicle registration: OD-02

Nachuni is a village and a commercial centre located in the Khordha district of the Indian state of Odisha. It is situated along National Highway 16, which connects Chennai and Kolkata.

== Geography ==
Nachuni is located at 19.8386°N 85.3228°E in the coastal plains of Odisha. It sits approximately 95 kilometres southwest of the state capital, Bhubaneswar, and lies close to the border of the Ganjam district. The geography is characterized by its proximity to Chilika Lake, the largest coastal lagoon in India, which influences the local climate and economy. The soil is primarily alluvial, suitable for paddy cultivation.

== Demographics ==
According to the 2011 Census of India, Nachuni has a population structure typical of the coastal Odisha region. The literacy rate in the village is generally higher than the national average, supported by local educational institutions. The primary language spoken is Odia.

== Education ==
The village hosts several educational institutions catering to the secondary and higher secondary levels:

- Nachuni Mahavidyalaya: A degree college established to provide higher education to students from the Banapur and Chilika areas.
