= Regional Transport Office =

Indian government authority

Agency overview
- Type: Government agency
- Jurisdiction: All States and Union Territories of India
- Agency executive: Regional Transport Officer (RTO)
- Parent agency: Respective states and Union Territories motor vehicles/transport department.
- Website: https://parivahan.gov.in

The Regional Transport Office or District Transport Office or Regional Transport Authority (RTO/DTO/RTA) is an office administered by the State Governments constituted under Section 213 (1) of the Motor Vehicles Act, 1988 of India and is responsible for implementing the various provisions of this Act. It operates under the Transport Department of the State Government. It is responsible for maintaining a database of drivers and a database of vehicles for various states of India.

The RTO issues driving licences, organises collection of vehicle excise duty (also known as road tax and road fund licence) and sells personalised registrations.

Along with this, the RTO is also responsible to inspect vehicle's insurance and fitness and clear the pollution test.

Function of RTO:

1. To enforce the provisions of the various acts of motor vehicles, central motor vehicle rules and the State motor vehicle rules as laid down by the government from time to time.
2. To ensure that co-ordinated development of road transport through management of permit.
3. To charge and collect tax as per the provisions of the motor vehicle act.
4. To enforce road safety and bring in new amendments into force with relation to the Indian Motor Vehicle Act 1988.

The officer ranks are categorized as: (Rank from lower to higher, Mostly known by different names for designations across different states)

1. Junior Inspector of Motor Vehicles/ Assistant Motor Vehicles Inspector (AMVI)
2. Senior Inspector of Motor Vehicles/Motor Vehicles Inspector (MVI)
3. Assistant Regional Transport Officer/Joint Regional Transport Officer (Jt.RTO)
4. Regional Transport Officer (RTO)
5. Followed by other top-level officers, such as Deputy, Joint, and Additional Transport Commissioners, with the Transport Commissioner acting as the administrator for the department.
- The above-mentioned designation names are as per the nomenclature of the Government of Karnataka and the Government of Kerala.

== RTO database ==
The RTO identifies untaxed vehicles (Periodic or Lifetime), and identify keepers of cars entering various Indian states, or who exceed speed limits on a road that has speed cameras by matching the cars to their keepers utilising the RTO database.

The High Security Registration plates (HSRP) were introduced to help reduce vehicle crime and improve security. It is intended to deter criminals from disguising stolen cars with the identity of written off or scrapped vehicles.

The RTO database will include important details such as Make, Model, VIN number, and further changes (if any) and the owner of the car is completely entitled to with any law offense or change of ownership or renewal procedures.

=== Vehicle registration certificate ===
The owner of a vehicle can apply and get duplicate copy of the vehicle registration certificate from the concerned RTO office if it is stolen, lost, destructed and completely written off. A complaint should be lodged to the police station which is situated under the jurisdiction / area of lost before approaching the regional transport officer. After completing the formalities, the owner has to submit FORM 26 and the Police Certificate to the Registering Authority along with the required documents for applying duplicate vehicle registration certificate.

Certain states in the country allow for acquiring a certificate for candidates appearing to Heavy Motor Vehicle licenses to which Government of India or Government of India allied centers take responsibility in teaching Road safety, Public driving skills and risk aversion management.

Vehicle certification pertaining to scrappage of a motor vehicle after the expiry of Green Tax validity and after the completion of Life Time Tax (Petrol vehicles up to 20 years and Diesel vehicles up to 15 years) is also carried with the Regional Transport Office of the respective states.

Certain states in the country also ensures the Regional Transport Office/Officer to inspect and issue a certification for protocol management of VIP convoys for to ensure safety and to avoid mismanagement.

== See also ==
- Driving licence in India
- List of RTO districts in India
- Vehicle registration plates of India
