= Roads in India =

Indian National Highway network map

Indian highway density map in lane kilometres per 100,000 people as of 2012. Average lane kilometres per 100,000 equals average kilometres of road per 100,000 multiplied by average number of lanes per road for a country. India's average was 7.7 lane km per 100,000, compared to 49 for Japan and 114 for the US.

Roads in India are an important mode of transport in India. India has a network of over 6,617,900 km (4,112,200 mi) of roads. As of June 2026, India has the largest road network in the world. At (1.94 km, 1.21 mi) of roads per square kilometre of land, the quantitative density of India's road network is equal to that of Hong Kong, and substantially higher than the United States (0.71 km, 0.44 mi), China (0.54 km, 0.34 mi), Brazil (0.23 km, 0.14 mi) and Russia (0.09 km, 0.056 mi). Adjusted for its large population, India has approximately 5.13 kilometres (3.19 mi) of roads per 1,000 people, which is much lower than United States 20.5 kilometres (12.7 mi) but higher than that of China 3.6 kilometres (2.2 mi). India's road network carries over 71% of its freight and about 85% of passenger traffic.

Since the 1990s, major efforts have been underway to modernize the country's road infrastructure. As of 31 March 2020, 70.00% of Indian roads were paved. As of 31 December 2023, India had completed and placed into use over 35,000 kilometres (22,000 mi) of four or more lane highways connecting many of its major manufacturing, commercial and cultural centres. According to the Ministry of Road Transport and Highways, as of March 2021, India had about 151,019 kilometres (93,839 mi) of national highways and expressways, plus another 186,528 kilometres (115,903 mi) of state highways. Major projects are being implemented under the Bharatmala, a Government of India initiative. Private builders and highway operators are also implementing major projects.

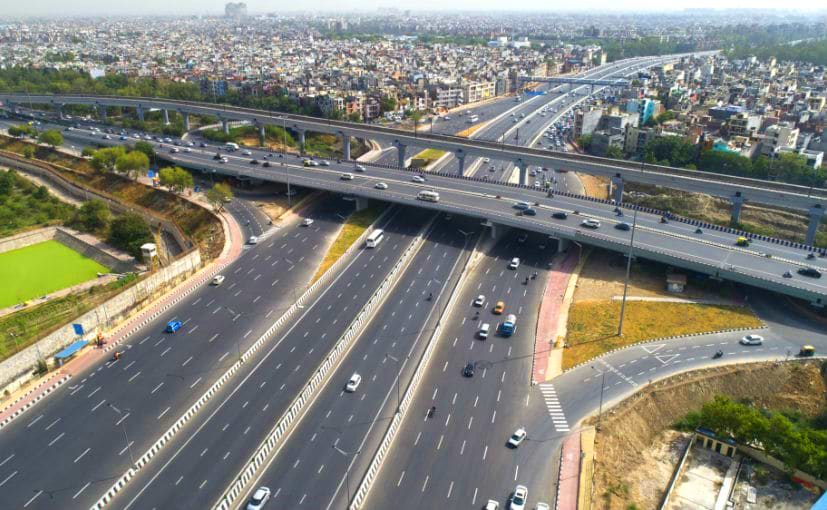
Delhi-Meerut Expressway, one of the widest expressway in India with 14 lanes

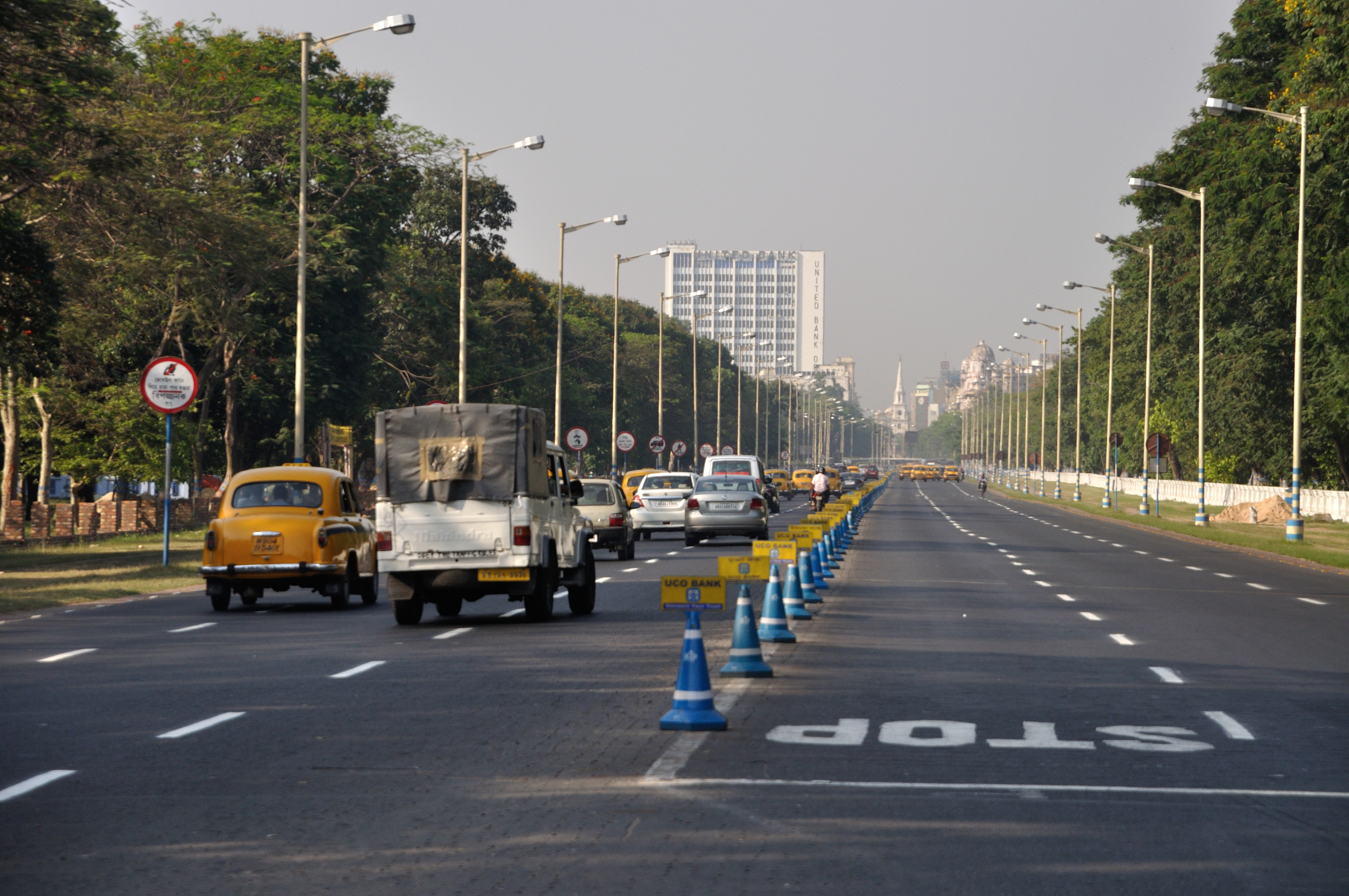
Red Road, a major 6-lane highroad in Kolkata

== Organization ==
The Indian road network is administered by various government authorities, given India's federal form of government. The following table shows the total length of India's road network by type of road and administering authority as of 31 March 2020.

Category	Managing Authority	Length (km)	Length percentages
National highways	Ministry of Road Transport and Highways	151,000	2.19%
State highways	Public works department of state/union territory	186,528	3.00%
District Roads	Public works department of state/union territory	632,154	10.17%
Rural roads	Panchayats and PMGSY	4,535,511	72.97%
Urban roads	Municipal corporations and municipalities	544,683	8.76%
Project roads	Various government departments of states/union territories, and SAIL, NMDC and BRO	354,921	5.70%
Total	Total roadways	6,404,797 km	100%

== History ==
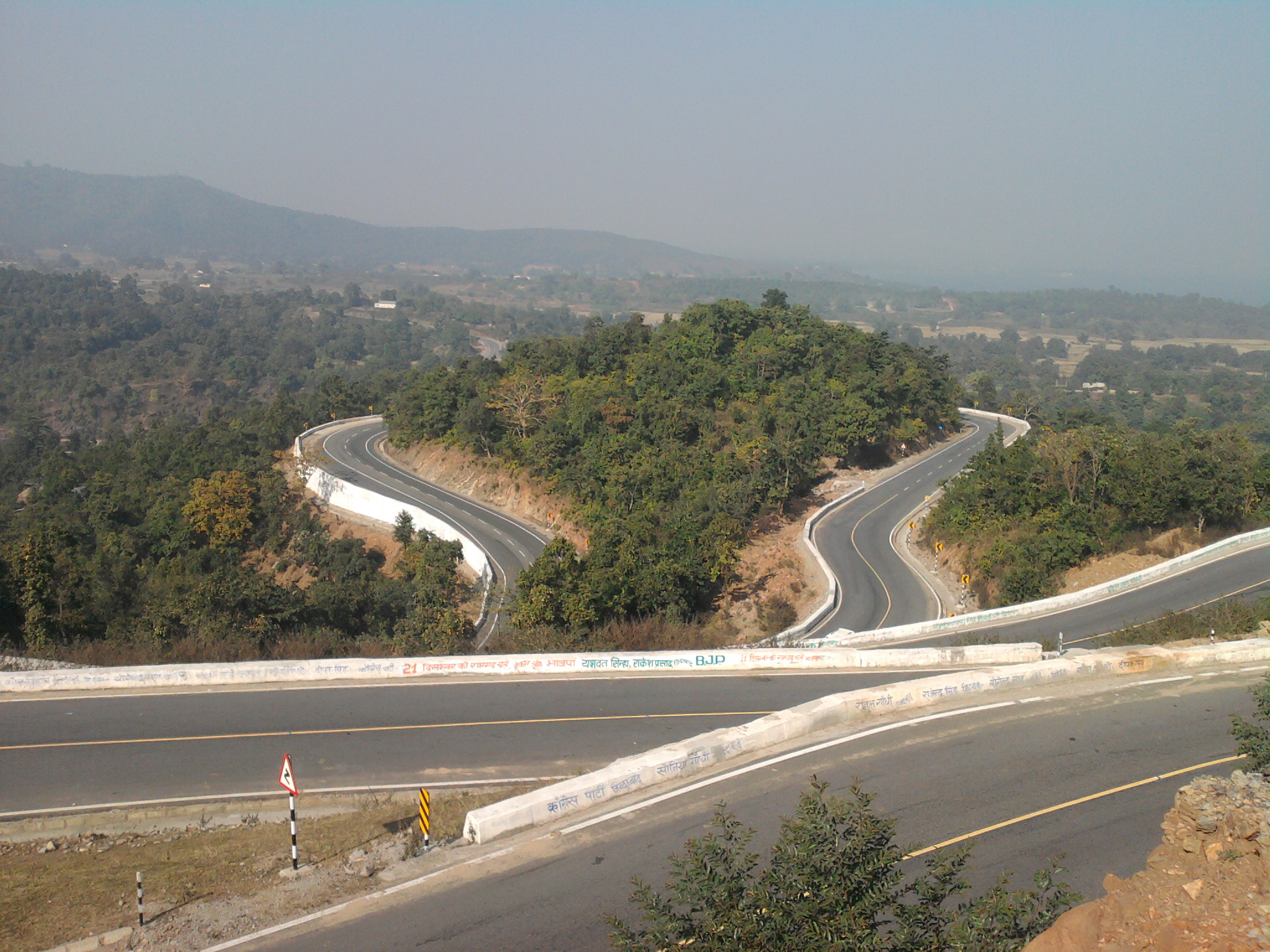
State Highway near Ranchi

Evolution of Indian trade networks. The main map shows the routes since Mughal times, Inset A: shows the major prehistorical cultural currents, B: pre-Mauryan routes, C: Mauryan routes, D: routes c. 1st century CE, and E: the Z-shaped region of developed roads.

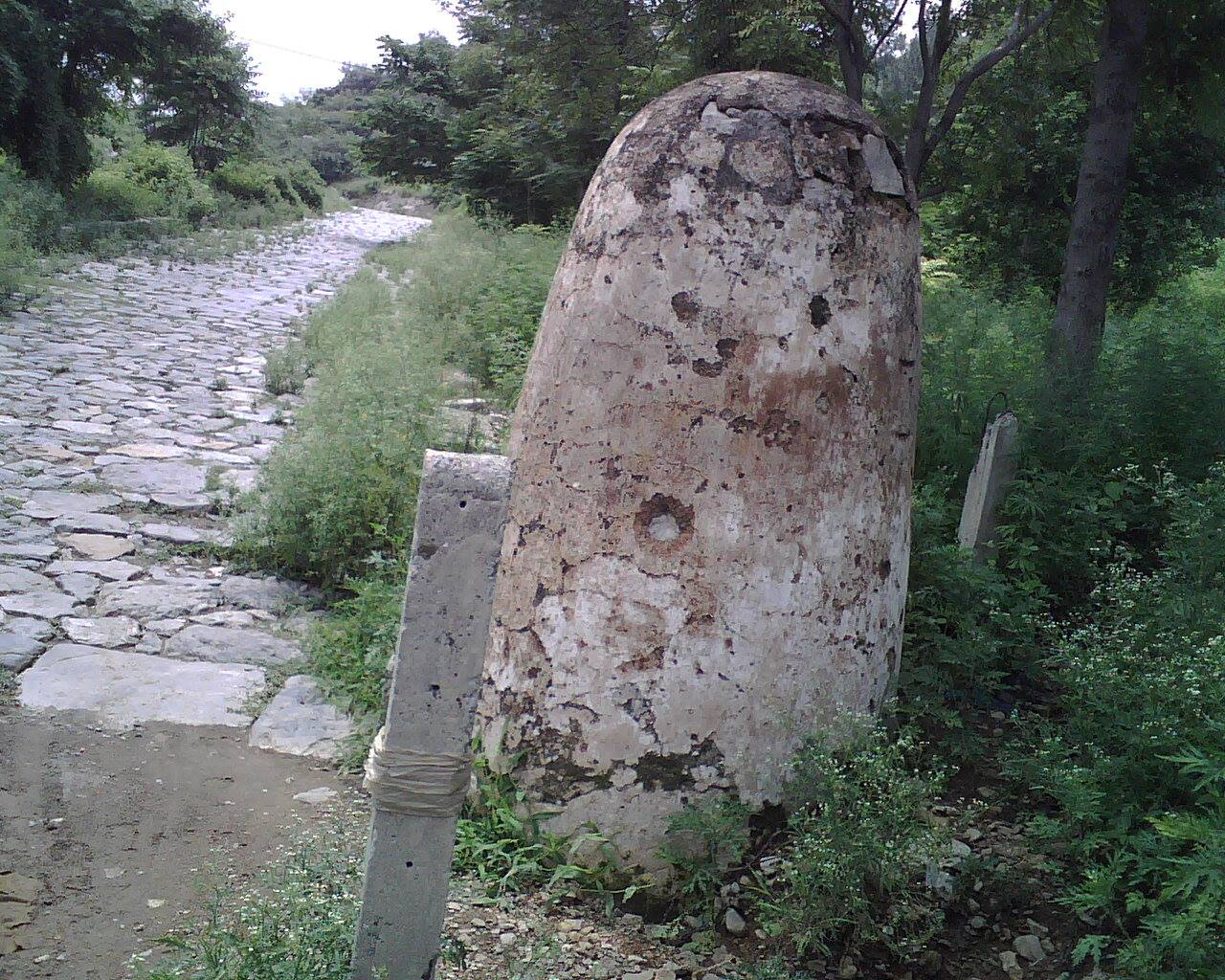
A section of the Old Grand Trunk Road, one of the oldest roads in Asia. Originally built by Ashoka and rebuilt by Sher Shah Suri. Kos Minars (right) were used to mark major routes.

The first evidence of road development in the Indian subcontinent can be traced back to approximately around 2800 BC in the ancient cities of Harrapa and Mohenjodaro of the Indus Valley Civilization. Ruling emperors and monarchs of ancient and medieval India continued to construct roads to connect the cities.

Two roads the Dakshinapatha(The Southern Road) and Uttarapatha(The Northern Road) were used in Ancient India for trading and travelling. The Dakshinapatha eventually went out of use. Initially, the term Uttarapatha referred to the northern high road, the main trade route that followed along the river Ganges, crossed the Indo-Gangetic watershed, ran through the Punjab to Taxila (Gandhara) and further to Zariaspa or Balkh (Bactria) in Afghanistan. The Eastern terminus was of the road was the port of Tamluk( at that time called Tamraliptika). The port was a major centre of trade in ancient India. The Uttrapatha was connected to the Dakhinpatha at the city of Varanasi.

The Uttarapatha is now called the Grand Trunk Road.

The existing Grand Trunk Road was re-built by the Mauryan Empire, and further rebuilt by subsequent entities such as the Sur Empire, the Mughal Empire and the British Empire.

In the 1830s, the British East India Company started a programme of metalled road construction (a.k.a. gravel road), for both commercial and administrative purposes. The Grand Trunk Road – from Calcutta, through Delhi to Peshawar – was rebuilt at a cost of £1,000 per mile; roads from Bombay to Pune, Bombay to Agra and Bombay to Madras were constructed; and a Public Works Department and the Indian Institute of Technology Roorkee were founded, to train and employ local surveyors, engineers and overseers, to perform the work, and to maintain the roads. This programme resulted in an estimated 2,500 kilometres (1,600 mi) of metalled roads being constructed by the 1850s.

In December 1934, the Indian Roads Congress (IRC) was formed, on the recommendations of the Indian Road Development Committee (Jayakar Committee) of the Government of India. In 1943, they proposed a twenty-year plan to increase the road network from 350,000 kilometres (220,000 mi) to 532,700 kilometres (331,000 mi) by 1963, to achieve a road density of 16 km per 100 km^{2} of land. The construction was to be paid in part through the duty imposed, since 1939, on petrol sales. This became known as the Nagpur Plan. The construction target was achieved in the late 1950s. In 1956, a Highways Act was passed, and a second twenty-year plan proposed for the period 1961–1981, with the ambition of doubling road density to 32 km per 100 km^{2}. This second plan became known as the Bombay Road Plan.

In 1988, an autonomous entity called the National Highways Authority of India (NHAI) was established by an Act of Parliament and came into existence on 15 June 1989. The Act empowered NHAI to develop, maintain and manage India's road network through National Highways. However, little happened until India introduced widespread economic liberalization in the early 1990s. Since 1995, NHAI has increasingly privatized road network development in India.

Golden Quadrilateral connects the four major Metropolitan Cities of India, viz., Delhi (north), Kolkata (east), Chennai (south) and Mumbai (west).

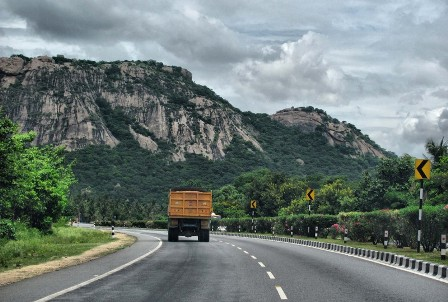
NH76: Part of India's Golden Quadrilateral highway network

In 1998, National Highways Development Project (NHDP) was started by the then Prime Minister Atal Bihari Vajpayee. The flagship project of the NHDP is the Golden Quadrilateral, a total of 5,846 kilometres (3,633 mi) of four-to-six-lane highways connecting the four major cities of Delhi, Mumbai, Chennai and Kolkata. The total cost of the project is ₹300 billion (US$3.1 billion), funded largely by the government's special petroleum product tax revenues and government borrowing. In January 2012, India announced that the four-lane GQ highway network was complete.

Another important road project of the NHDP is the 7,142-kilometre (4,438 mi) four-to-six-lane North–South and East–West Corridor, comprising national highways connecting four extreme points of the country. The project aims to connect Srinagar in the north to Kanyakumari in the south (including a spur from Salem to Kanyakumari, via Coimbatore and Kochi), and Silchar in the east to Porbandar in the west. As of 31 October 2016, 90.99% of the project had been completed, 5.47% of the project work is under implementation and 3.52% of the total length is remaining.

As of May 2017, under NHDP, about 28,915 kilometres (17,967 mi) of four-to-six-lane highways have been constructed (including the GQ and N–S/E–W Corridor), while a total of 48,793 kilometres (30,319 mi) of road has been planned to have four-to-six lanes under the NHDP.

The National Highways and Infrastructure Development Corporation Limited (NHIDCL) is a Public Sector Enterprise(PSE) created by the Ministry of Road Transport and Highways (MoRTH), Government of India in the year 2014 to build highways in technical challenging and high altitude regions of the Northeast India, Uttarakhand, Jammu and Kashmir, Ladakh and the Andaman & Nicobar Islands. It has the task to implement the Special Accelerated Road Development Programme for North Eastern Region (SARDP-NE) in National Highways portion. The SARDP-NE is under implementation in Phases.

- Phase-A: Approved in 2005, it included about 4,099 km length of roads (3,014 km of NH and 1,085 km of State roads). The SARDP-NE Phase ‘A’ is expected to be completed by 2023–24.
- Phase-B: It covers 3,723 km (2,210 km NHs and 1,513 km of State roads) of road. Phase ‘B’ of SARDP-NE shall be taken up after completion of Phase ‘A’.

Bharatmala is a centrally-sponsored and funded road and highways project of the Government of India, started in 2017, with a target of constructing 83,677 km (51,994 mi) of new highways at an estimated cost of ₹5.35 trillion (US$56 billion). Bharatmala Phase I plans to construct 34,800 kilometres (21,600 mi) of highways (including the remaining projects that were under NHDP) by 2021–22, at an estimated cost of ₹535,000 crore (US$56 billion). In 2021, Asia's longest high speed track, National Automotive Test Track was inaugurated in Indore, which would be used to measure the maximum speed capabilities of high-end cars and other categories of vehicles.

India's rate of road building has accelerated since 2010s. It averaged about 12 kilometres (7.5 mi) per day in 2014–15 and 30 kilometres (19 mi) per day in 2018–19. The country's target is to build 40 kilometres (25 mi) of highways per day.

On July 21, 2021, the Minister of Road Transport and Highways Nitin Gadkari said that India has created a world record of constructing 2.5 kilometres (1.6 mi) of four-lane concrete road in 24 hours and 26 kilometres (16 mi) of single lane bitumen road in just 21 hours as per the highest IRC norms and specifications of the MoRTH to ensure quality control. Also, an average of 36.5 kilometres (22.7 mi) of highways have been constructed every day during 2020–21. As of 2021, 64.5% of all goods in India are moved through the country's road network, 90% of India's total passenger traffic uses the road network to commute and the road network contributes 4.8% to the country's gross domestic product.

In 2023, India's road network became the world's second largest, after the United States. From 2013 to 2014 to 2022 to 2023, the country's road network grew by approximately 59%. In August 2023, the Border Roads Organisation, a statutory body under the Ministry of Defence, began construction on the Likaru-Mig La-Fukche road in Ladakh, which on its completion will be the world's highest motorable road.

As of 2026, India's road network is the largest in the world.

Growth of Road Network by Categories (km)
Road Category	1950-51	1960-61	1970-71	1980-81	1990-91	2000-01	2010-11	2015-16	2020-21
National Highways	19,811 (4.95%)	23,798 (4.54%)	23,838 (2.61%)	31,671 (2.13%)	33,650 (1.45%)	57,737 (1.71%)	70,934 (1.52%)	101,011 (1.80%)	151,000 (2.51%)
State highways	^	^	56,765 (6.20%)	94,359 (6.35%)	127,311 (5.47%)	132,100 (3.92%)	163,898 (3.50%)	176,166 (3.14%)	186,528 (3.00%)
District roads	173,723 (43.44%)	257,125 (49.02%)	276,833 (30.26%)	421,895 (28.40%)	509,435 (21.89%)	736,001 (21.82%)	998,895 (21.36%)	561,940 (10.03%)	632,154 (10.17%)
Rural roads	206,408 (51.61%)	197,194 (37.60%)	354,530 (38.75%)	628,865 (42.34%)	1,260,430 (54.16%)	1,972,016 (58.46%)	2,749,804 (58.80%)	3,935,337 (70.23%)	4,535,511 (72.97%)
Urban roads	0	46,361 (8.84%)	72,120 (7.88%)	123,120 (8.29%)	186,799 (8.03%)	252,001 (7.47%)	411,679 (8.80%)	509,730 (9.10%)	544,683 (8.76%)
Project roads	0	0	130,893 (14.31%)	185,511 (12.49%)	209,737 (9.01%)	223,665 (6.63%)	281,628 (6.02%)	319,109 (5.70%)	354,921 (5.71%)
Total	399,942	524,478	914,979	1,485,421	2,327,362	3,373,520	4,676,838	5,603,293	6,215,797
Figures in parentheses indicate the percentage of total road length for that fiscal year.

== Types of roads ==
=== Expressway ===
As per NHAI and Indian Roads Congress, expressways are access controlled highways with a divided carriageway, designed for high speed vehicular movement and heavy traffic. Most of the existing expressways in India are toll roads. Expressways make up approximately 5,579 km (3,467 mi) of India's road network, as of 2024.

National Expressways Authority of India (NEAI) operating under the Ministry of Road Transport and Highways will be in-charge of the construction and maintenance of expressways. The NHAI by Government of India aims to expand the expressway network and plans to add an additional 18,637 km (11,580 mi) of expressways by 2024 apart from existing national highways.

India's first 8-lane wide access-controlled expressway, the Delhi Noida Direct Flyway (DND Flyway), operational in January 2001, is an expressway connecting Delhi and Noida in the states of Delhi and Uttar Pradesh. The Mumbai Pune Expressway, connecting Mumbai and Pune in Maharashtra fully operational in 2002, is India's first 6-lane wide access-controlled tolled expressway. The Yamuna Expressway is a 165 km (103 mi) six-lane controlled-access expressway opened on 9 August 2012. On 21 November 2016, the 302 km (188 mi) six-lane Agra Lucknow Expressway was opened. Under construction as of 2019, the Mumbai–Nagpur Expressway is expected to become the largest expressway in the country. Several expressway projects, such as the Delhi–Mumbai Expressway, Amritsar–Jamnagar Expressway, Surat–Chennai Expressway, Delhi-Jaipur Expressway,Ganga Expressway Lucknow-Kanpur Expressway are planned/under-construction.

The Trans Harbour bridge is the longest bridge in India and it will be opened on 12 January 2024, after Prime Minister Narendra Modi inaugurates the bridge. It connects Bombay with Navi Mumbai.

=== National highways ===
North-South East-West Corridors connects Srinagar to Kanyakumari and Porbandar to Silchar

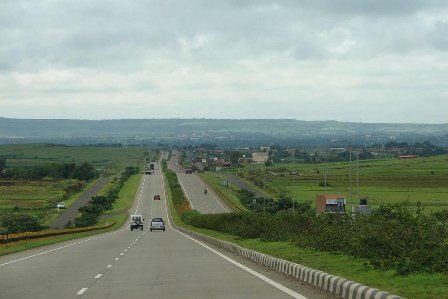
NH75: Part of India's NS and EW Corridor highway network

National highways are highways connecting major cities throughout the country with premium quality and are at-grade roads. National Highways are designated with NH, followed by the highway number. Indian national highways are further classified based on the width of the carriageway of the highway. India has around 150,000 km (93,000 mi) of National Highways as of April 2021 and is expected to reach 200,000 km By 2024 consisting of Top Notch Highways And Expressways. National Highways constituted 2.7% of India's total road network, but carried about 40% of road traffic, as of 2013. In 2016, the government vowed to double the highway length from 96,000 to 2,00,000 km.

The National Highways Authority of India (NHAI) and the National Highways and Infrastructure Development Corporation Limited (NHIDCL) are the authorities responsible for the development, maintenance and management of the National Highways in India. The NHAI has been undertaking developmental activities under the National Highways Development Project (NHDP) in five phases. From 2018, the pending projects under NHDP are expected to be subsumed under Bharatmala. The NHAI is also responsible for implementing other projects on National Highways, primarily road connectivity to major ports in India.

The Golden Quadrilateral and North–South and East–West Corridor were major ongoing highway development projects in India.

National Highway classification (as of 31 March 2020)
Lanes	Length (km)	Length share
Single-lane (3.75 m / 12.3 ft) or Intermediate lane (5.5 m / 18 ft )	29,693	20.49%
Double-lane (7 m / 23 ft without paved kerb) and (7.5 m / 24.6 ft with paved kerb )	72,281	55.05%
Four-lane / Six-lane / Eight-lane	37,058	24.46%
Total	1,39,032	100%

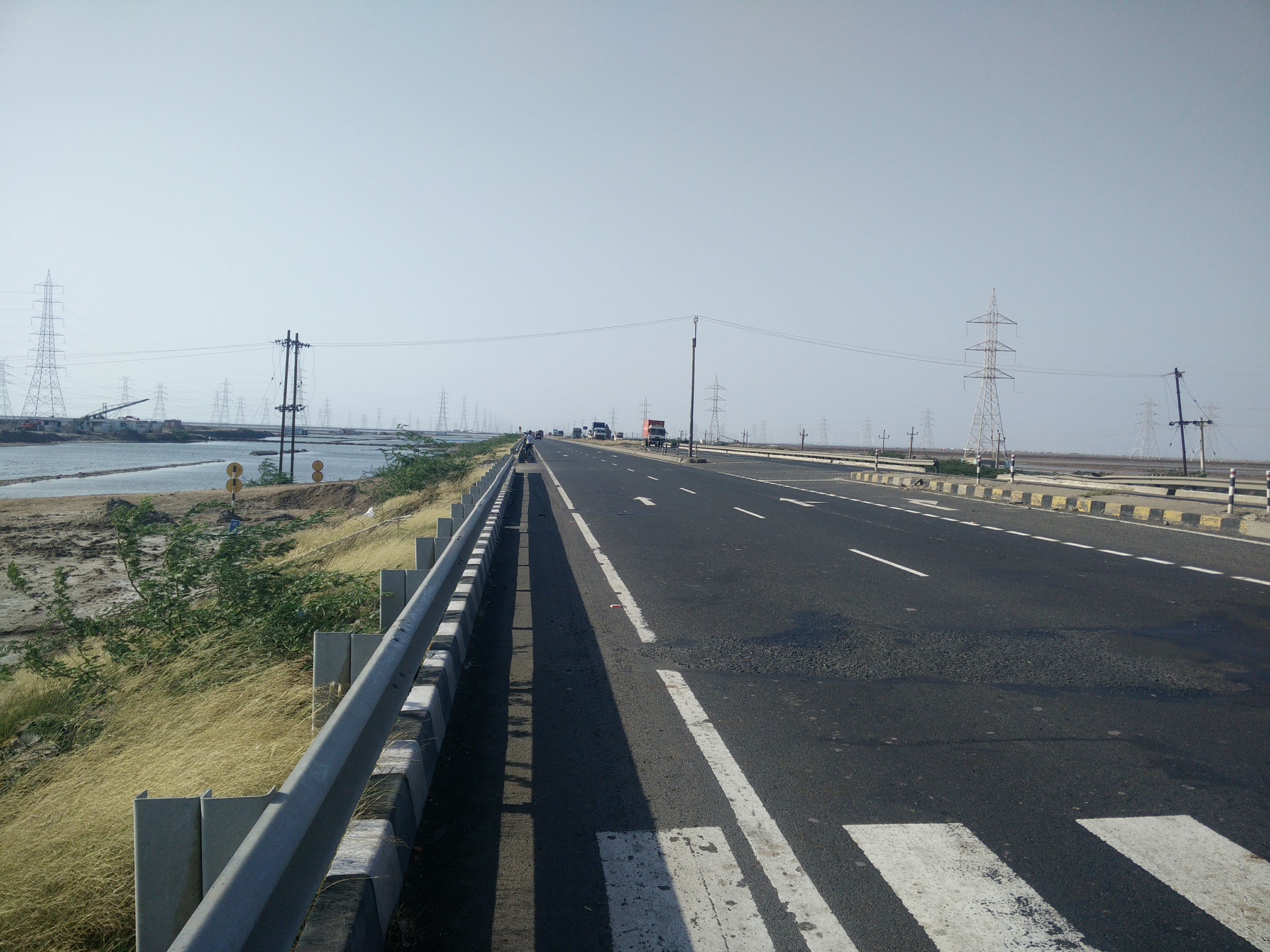
Gujarat State Highway 41

=== State highways ===
State highways are highways connecting major cities throughout a state and are also at-grade roads. They also connect with National Highways or state highways of neighboring states. State Highways are designated with SH, followed by the highway number and preceded by state code. As of 31 March 2020, the total length of state highways was 186,528 kilometres (115,903 mi). As of 31 March 2020, Maharashtra has the largest share of state highways among all states (22.14%), followed by Karnataka (11.11%), Gujarat (9.76%), Rajasthan (8.62%) and Tamil Nadu (6.67%).

State governments have the authority and responsibility to build state highways. Most of the state highways are developed by state public works departments. Independently of the Bharatmala program, state governments have been implementing a number of state highway projects since 2000. By 2010, state highway projects worth US$1.7 billion had been completed, and projects worth an additional US$11.4 billion were under implementation.

=== District roads ===
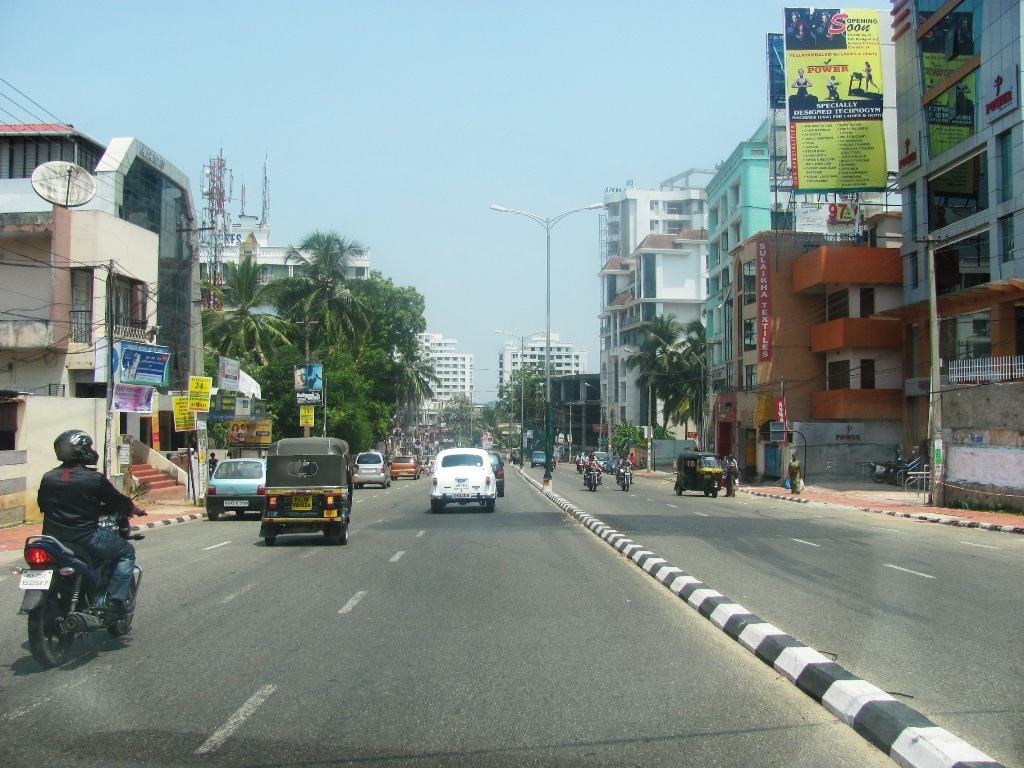
A district road in Thiruvananthapuram

District Roads in India are approximately 632,154 kilometres (392,802 mi), of which 14.80% of the total length was surfaced. Zila Parishads also have the authority and responsibility to build district roads.

=== Rural roads ===
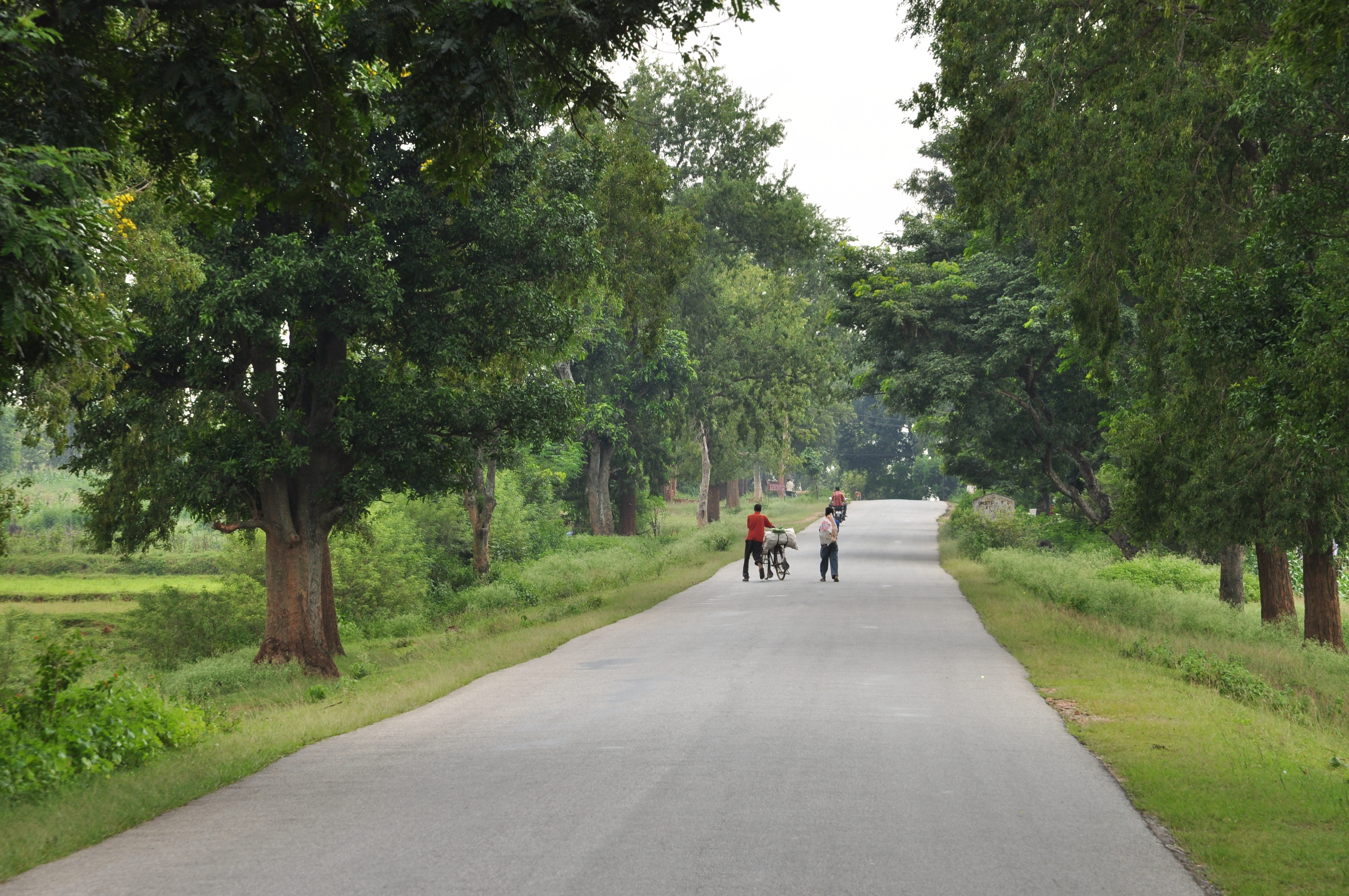
A rural road in Jharkhand

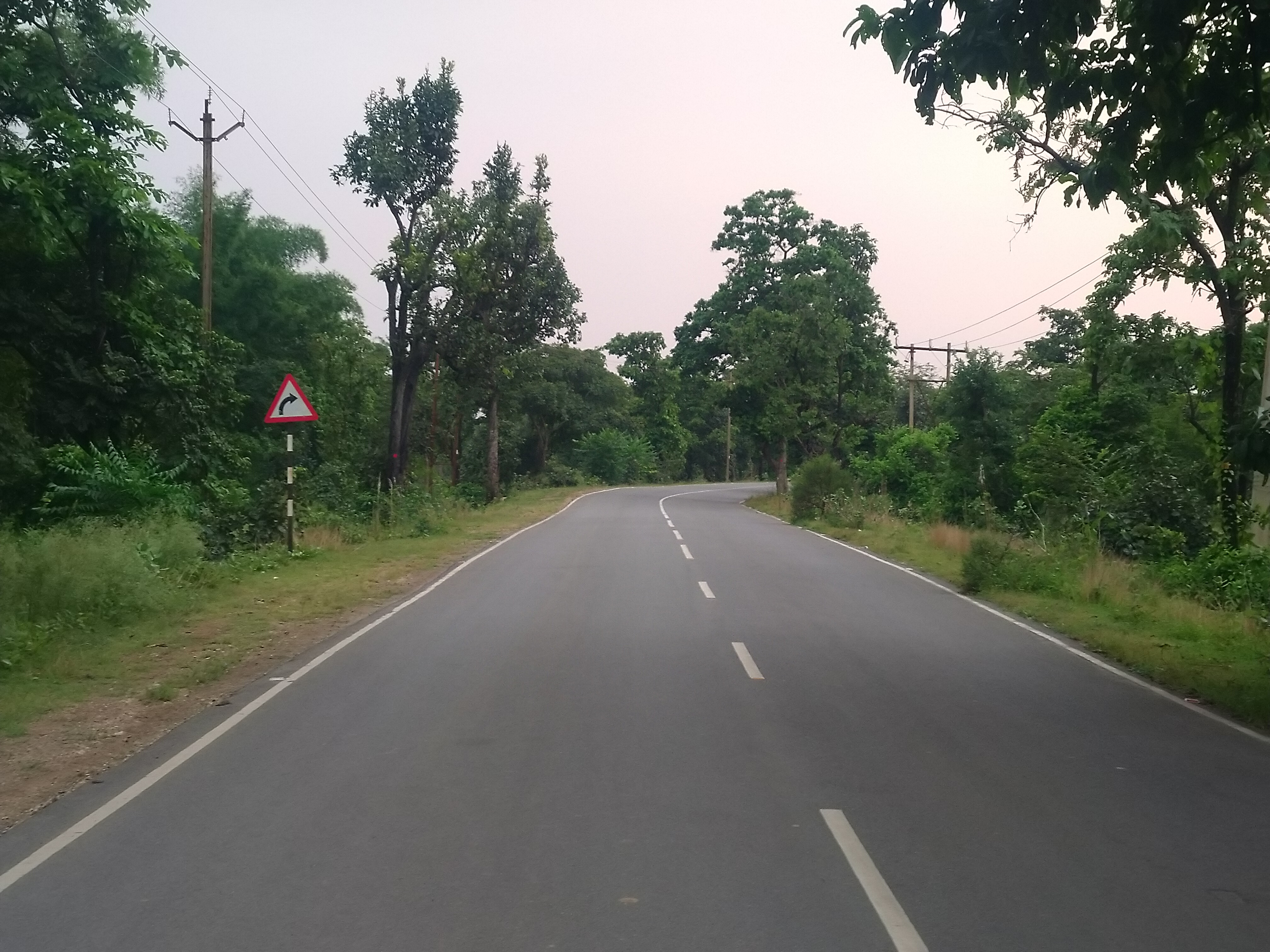
A rural road in Chhattisgarh

Rural roads form a substantial portion of the country's road network, forming 72.97% of the total of roads, as of March 2020. As of the same date, the percentage of unsurfaced roads to the total road length was 31%.

For the development of these rural roads, Pradhan Mantri Gram Sadak Yojana (Prime Minister's Rural Roads Scheme) was launched in December 2000 by the Indian government to provide connectivity to isolated rural habitations. The scheme envisions that these roads will be constructed and maintained by the village panchayats. In some parts of India, the government has attempted to manage the programme directly as a local social spending program.

In other parts of India, the Pradhan Mantri Gram Sadak Yojana and a sister program named Bharat Nirman (Build India) have privatized the rural road construction projects and deployed contractors. The effort has aimed to build all-season single-lane asphalted roads to connect India's rural and remote areas. A significant portion of funding for these projects has come from the World Bank and the Asian Development Bank.

Growth of Rural Road Network (km)
	Length 2001	Length 2011	Length 2021
Total rural roads	2.7 million	3.1 million	4.5 million
Paved unmaintained rural roads	0.5 million		
Unpaved rural roads	2.2 million	1.9 million	
Paved maintained rural roads		728,871	
New rural roads	322,900	82,743	1,500,000

=== Border roads ===
Border Roads are the roads constructed along the northern and northeastern borders of the country. These roads are constructed and maintained by Border Roads Organisation (BRO) which was set up in 1960 by the government of India. BRO is regarded as a symbol of nation building, national integration and an inseparable component in maintaining the security of the country.

== Stakeholders ==
Major stakeholders in construction and maintenance of roads in India
Sl. No.	Stakeholder	Type	Responsibility
1	Ministry of Road Transport and Highways (MoRTH)	Central Government Ministry	Policy making, funding, planning, and oversight of National Highways
2	National Highways Authority of India (NHAI)	Statutory Authority	Development, maintenance, and management of National Highways
3	State Public Works Departments (PWDs)	State Government Departments	Construction and maintenance of State Highways, Major District Roads, and rural roads
4	Border Roads Organisation (BRO)	Defence/Engineering Organisation	Construction and maintenance of roads in border areas and strategic locations
5	National Highways and Infrastructure Development Corporation Ltd (NHIDCL)	Government-owned Company	Development of highways in difficult and remote regions (e.g., Northeast, hilly areas)
6	Rural Development Departments (under Pradhan Mantri Gram Sadak Yojana - PMGSY)	Central/State Joint Initiative	Rural road connectivity and maintenance
7	Urban Local Bodies (Municipal Corporations, Municipalities)	Local Government	Construction and maintenance of urban roads and streets
8	Private Sector (under PPP, BOT, HAM models)	Private Companies	Construction, operation, and maintenance of roads and expressways through public-private partnerships
10	Zilla Panchayats and Gram Panchayats	Local Rural Bodies	Maintenance of village and internal rural roads

== Congestion ==
India's intra-city vehicle speed is among the lowest in the world. As per a study by Ola Cabs, in 2017, the average traffic speed in Delhi was 25 km/h (16 mph). Amongst other major cities, the average traffic speed in Chennai was 18.9 km/h (11.7 mph), in Mumbai was 20.7 km/h (12.9 mph), in Kolkata was 19.2 km/h (11.9 mph), in Hyderabad was 18.5 km/h (11.5 mph), and in Bengaluru was 17.2 km/h (10.7 mph).

== Fatalities ==
The World Health Organization's compilation of road network safety data for major economies found India to have the highest number of road fatalities in the world, with 299,091 deaths caused by road accidents in 2016. Also, fatalities per 100,000 population stay among the highest, at 22.6. Of total fatalities, 40% were of riders of 2 or 3 wheelers, 18% were of drivers and passengers of 4-wheeled cars and light vehicles, 18% were of drivers and passengers of buses and heavy trucks, 10% of pedestrians, 2% of cyclists and 13% of other.

== See also ==
- Indian Roads Congress
- Transport in India
- List of national highways in India
- 2010 renumbering of national highways in India
- Expressways of India
