= Indian Roads Congress =

Indian national technical body

Indian Roads Congress.
- Abbreviation: IRC
- Formation: 1927
- Legal status: On 24th September 1937 registered as society as per the Societies Registration Act, 1860.
- Headquarters: Indian Roads Congress
- Region served: India
- Members: More than five million (direct/indirect) associates and registered members of over 16,700 consisting of various professionals and engineers with all Stakeholders relating to road sector from organisations from State and Central Governments, Public Sectors, Institutions of Research, Local bodies, Private sector, and individuals relating to Consultants, Concessionaires, Contractors, Equipment manufacturers, Machinery manufacturers, Material producers & suppliers, and groups from Industrial Associations, Multilateral & Institutional organization and global organisations like World Bank, Asian Development Bank, Japan International Cooperation Agency, International Road Federation.
- Official language: English
- Website: irc.nic.in

Indian Roads Congress is the premier technical body of highway engineers which was formed in 1934 as India's national body for laying down and designing standards for roads and highway construction and provides a stage for exchanging expertise and latest research developments relating to it.

== History and Objective ==
The Indian Road Congress was formed as the apex body for Engineering in Highway construction in India in the year 1934 with 73 members with the main objective for development of roads and helping to provides a stage for exchanging expertise and latest research developments relating to it are shared. The association is a group of experts from various fields of Civil Engineering laying down road safety norms in India. It was set up after Sir Kenneth Mitchell, Consulting Engineer to the Government of India for Roads, proposed establishing a society to facilitate the exchange of ideas and expertise in road construction and maintenance, and after the approval of Jayakar Committee also known as Indian Road Development Committee. Currently the association has 18,000 members from various fields of engineering consisting of varied ranks in Border Roads Organisation, state and Central governments, engineering services in Army, Institutes in Road Research, engineering colleges, local bodies and private enterprises and awards the "Mitchell Medal" for best submittal published in its journal and discussed in its annual session..

In 2013 Indian Roads Congress had released codes for using plastic wastes for laying roads across country.

== Guidelines ==
=== Footpath Guidelines ===
Design in any road should adhere to certain basic principles for helping pedestrians navigate the footpath safely .

Indian Road Congress (IRC) laid down the following guidelines as per international best practices which are specified by the Institute for Transportation and Development Policy (ITDP).

==== Footpath Width ====
Based on the adjacent land use any footpath width can vary but mandatory requirement of 1.8 metres of minimum clear width is necessary in residential areas as space required for two wheelchairs to cross and for commercial areas the same should be minimum 2.5m.

==== Surface ====
After providing for required space for drainage and prevention of formation of puddles, flat walking surfaces should be provided in footpaths. To assist visual impaired people it is recommended to lay guide tiles along the length of the path.

==== Footpath Elements ====
Well planned footpaths provides space for walking and has provision of additional space for roadside vendors and bus stops not affecting the movement of pedestrians. An ideal footpath helps in integration of multiple elements with a unified structure.

==== Property Entrances ====
For pedestrian movements smoothly, it is recommended for footpaths to be continuous till the entrance of property . They should have standard height and for warning visually impaired people about possible movement of vehicles there should be a display of warning tiles on either part of the entrance of any property . To prevent parking of vehicles on the footpath, Bollards should be placed with a clear width of minimum 1.2m towards the left.

==== Bus Stops ====
To avoid buses pulling over towards left side, stops for buses should be placed adjacent to their linear path of travel and also its inappropriate positioning results in passengers waiting extending to the street during the wait time. To decrease travel time for commuters, bus bays should be avoided. Position for the bus stop should be decided after leaving enough area for pedestrians.

== See also ==
Roads in India.
