= Road signs in India =

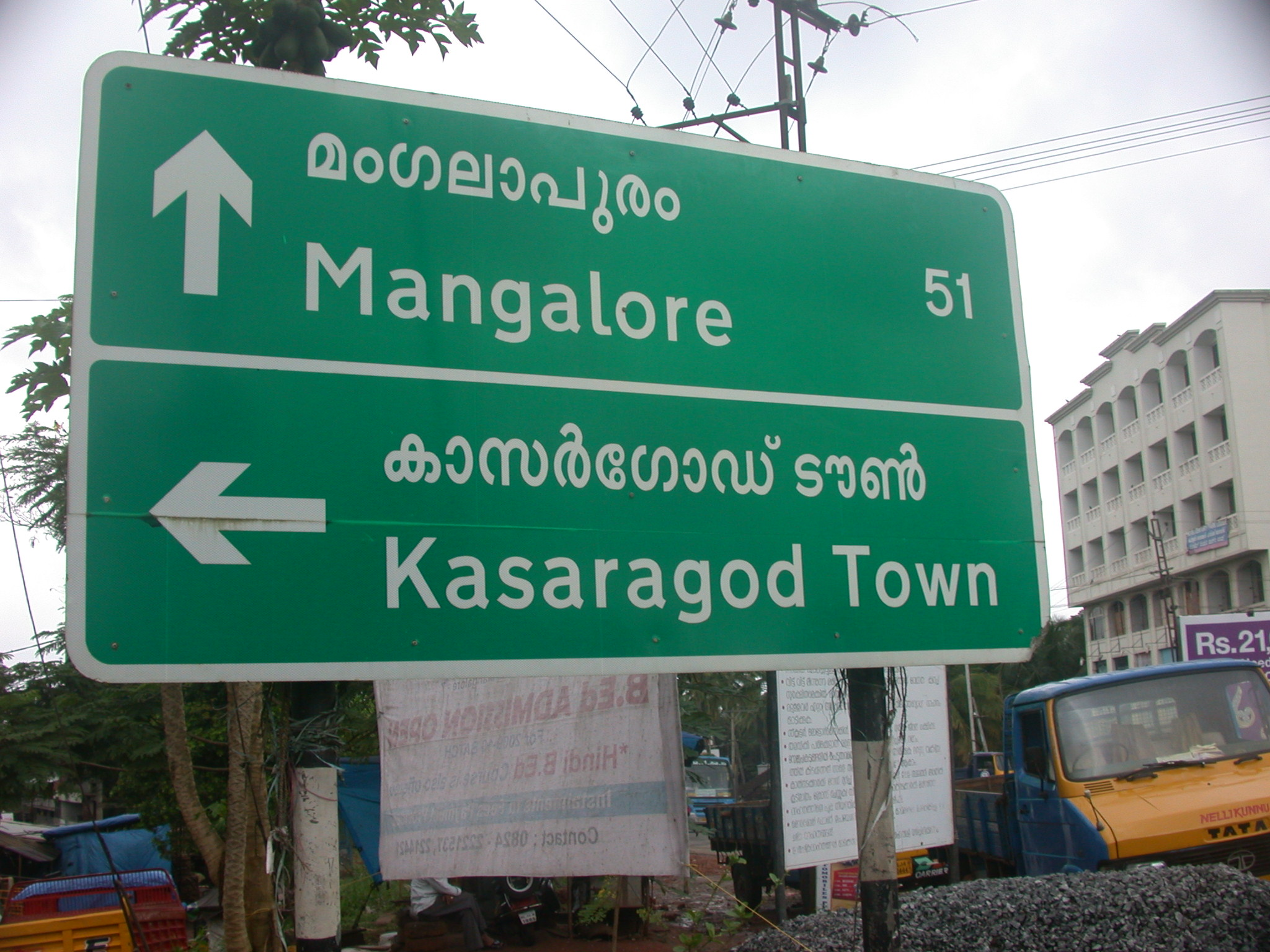
A signboard in Kerala

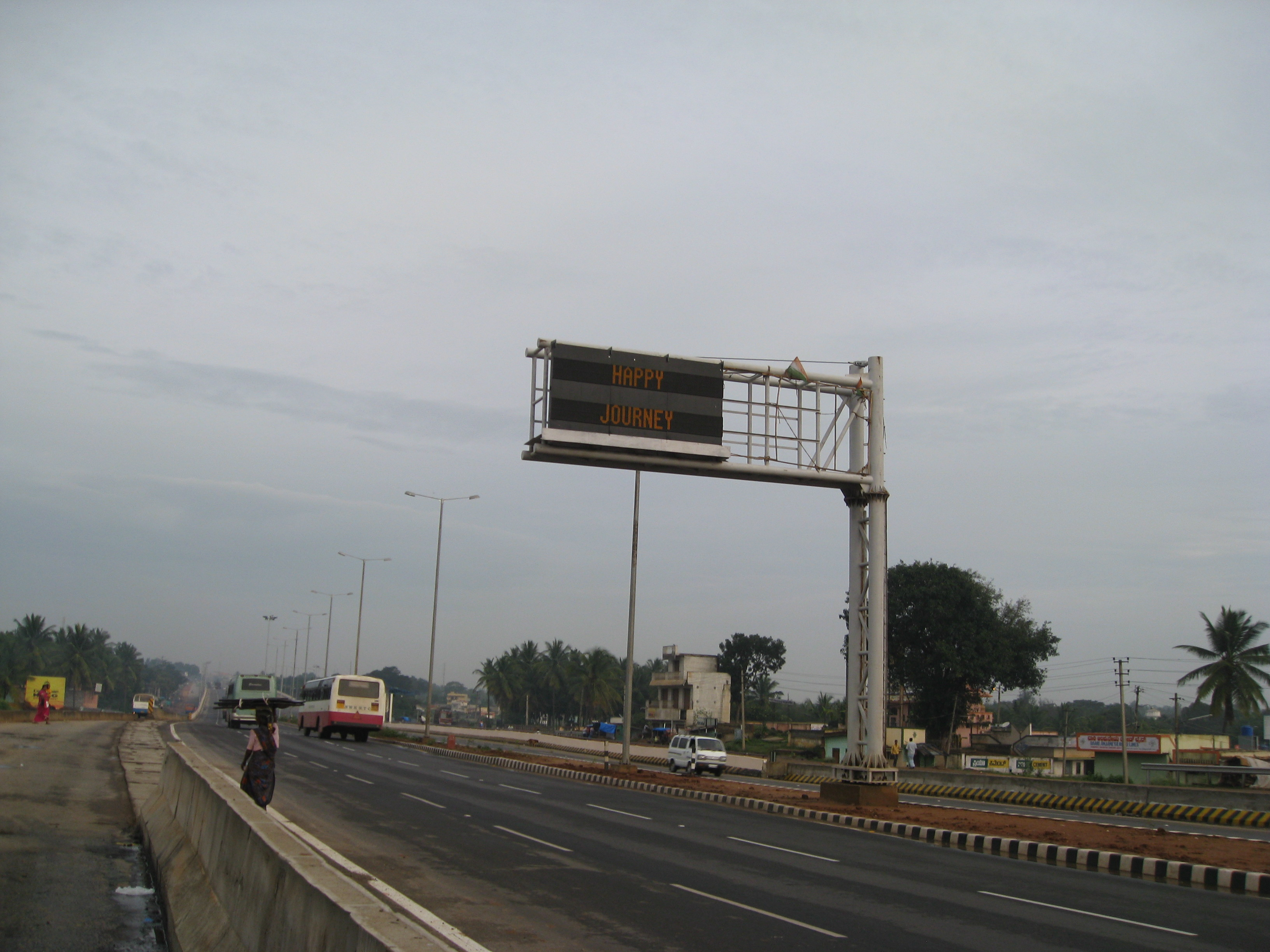
A sign in Bengaluru

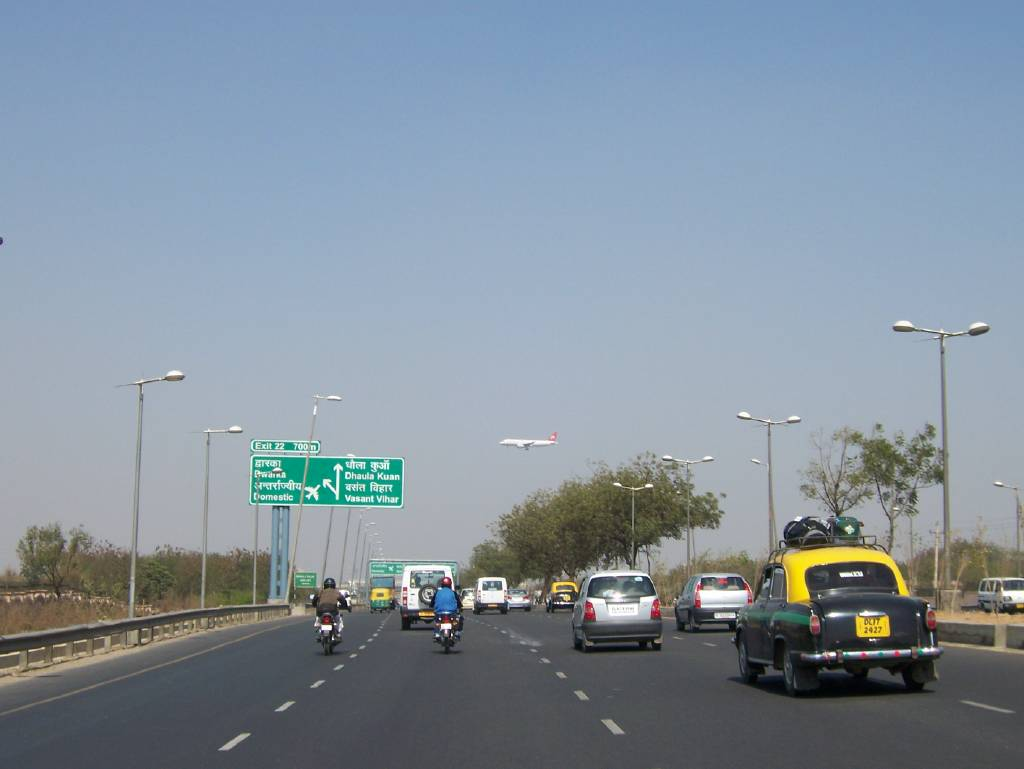
Gurgaon Expressway

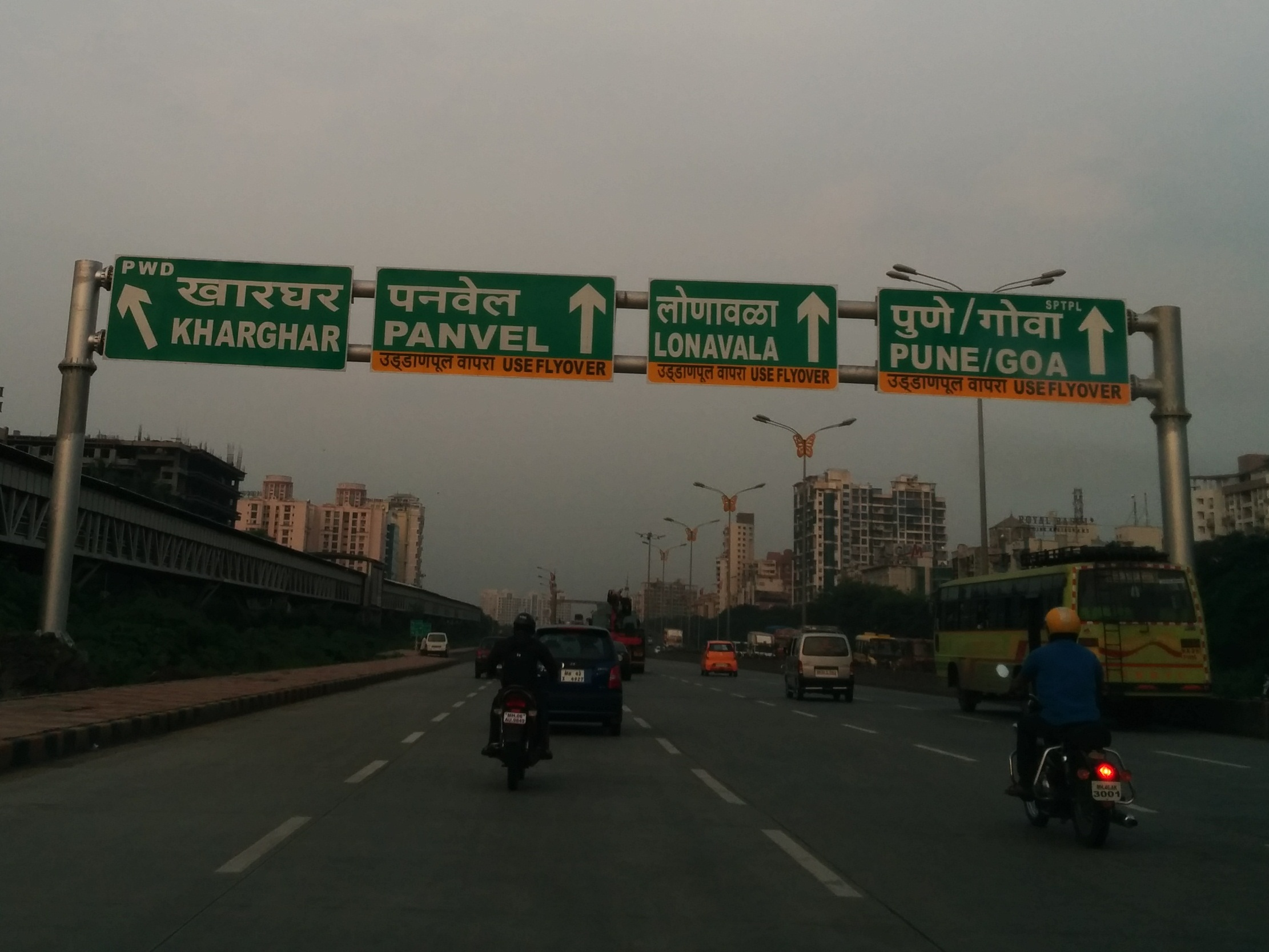
Sion Panvel Highway

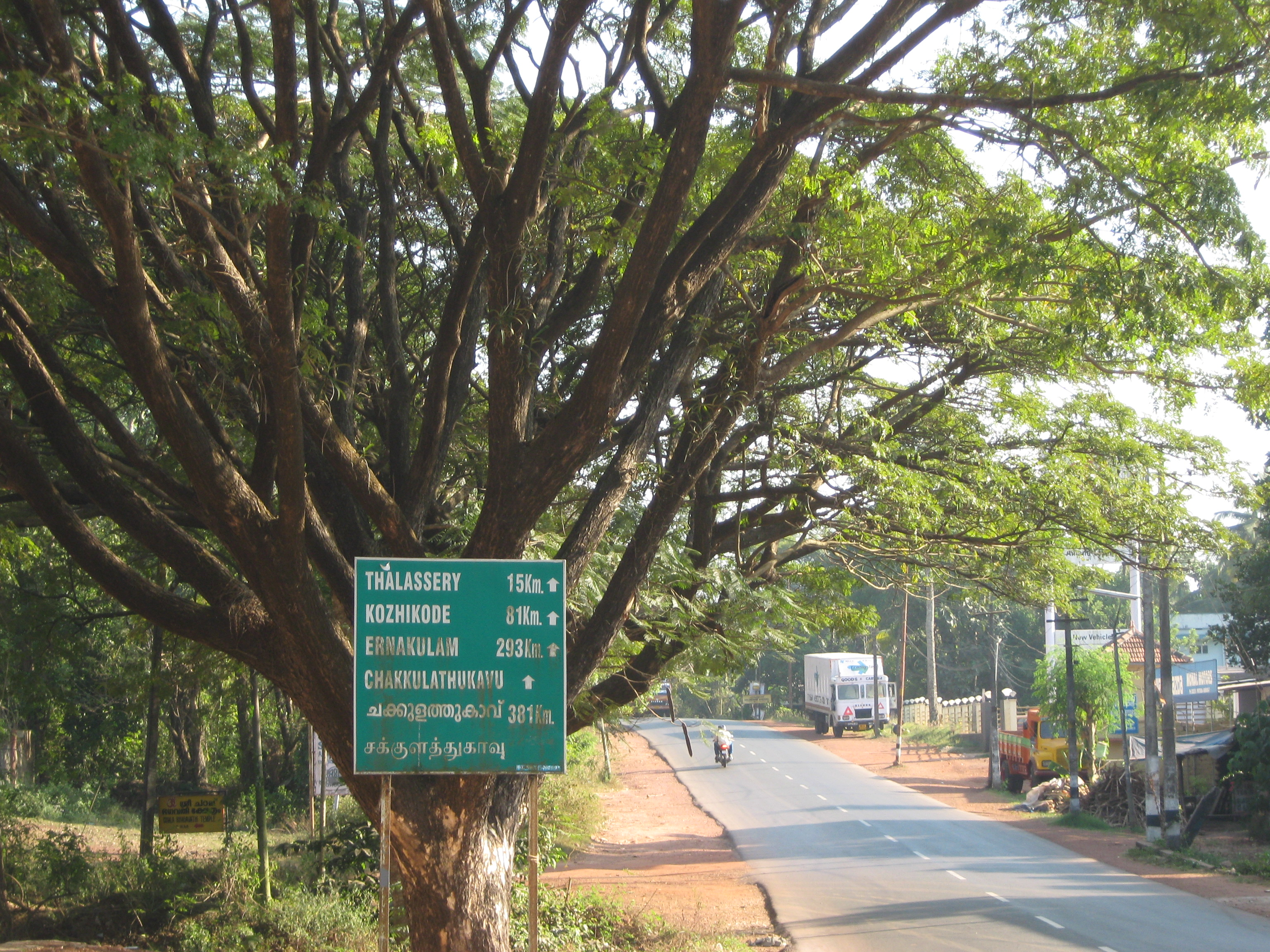
Traffic sign in Kannur

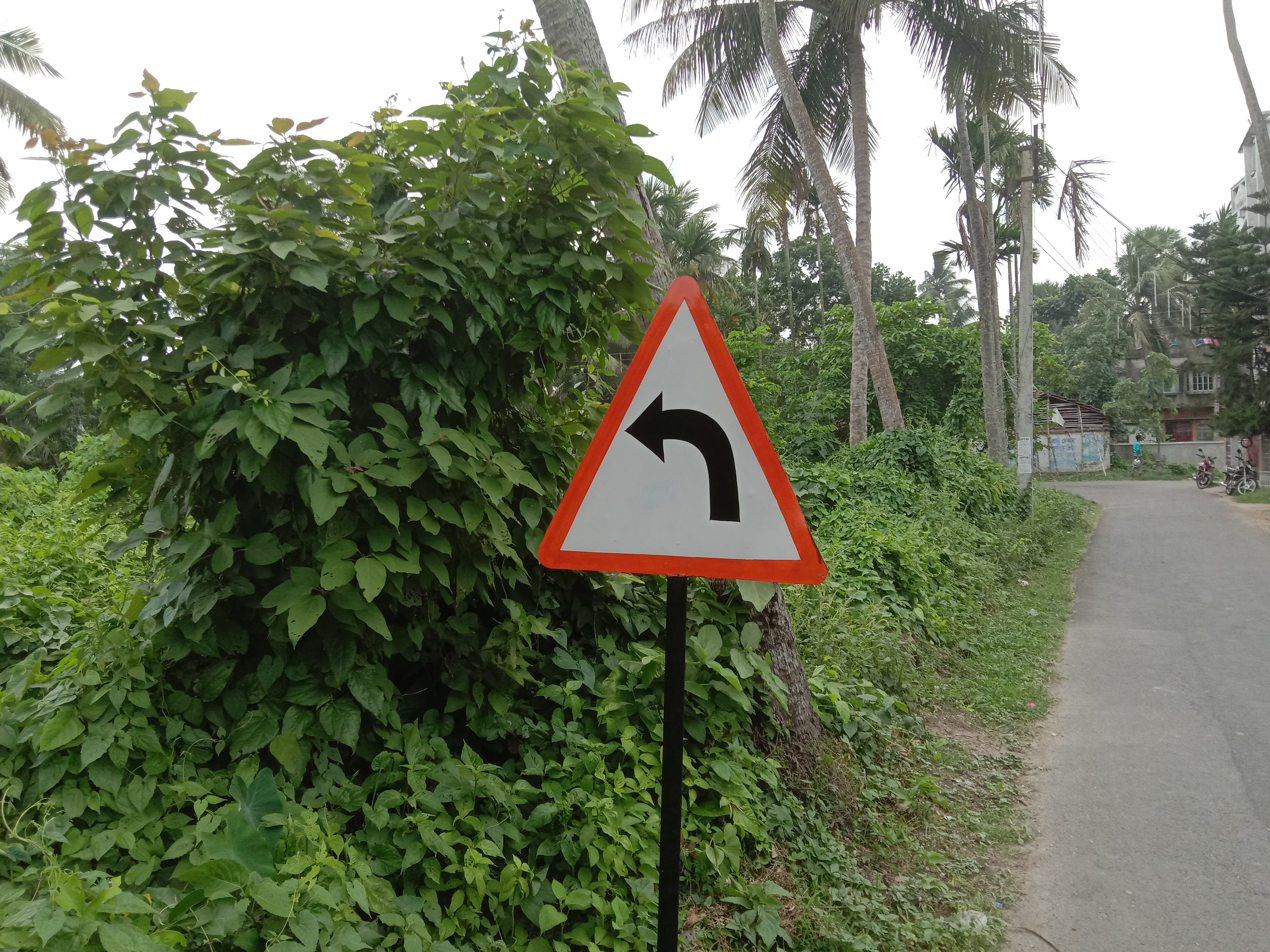
Road sign at a village in West Bengal

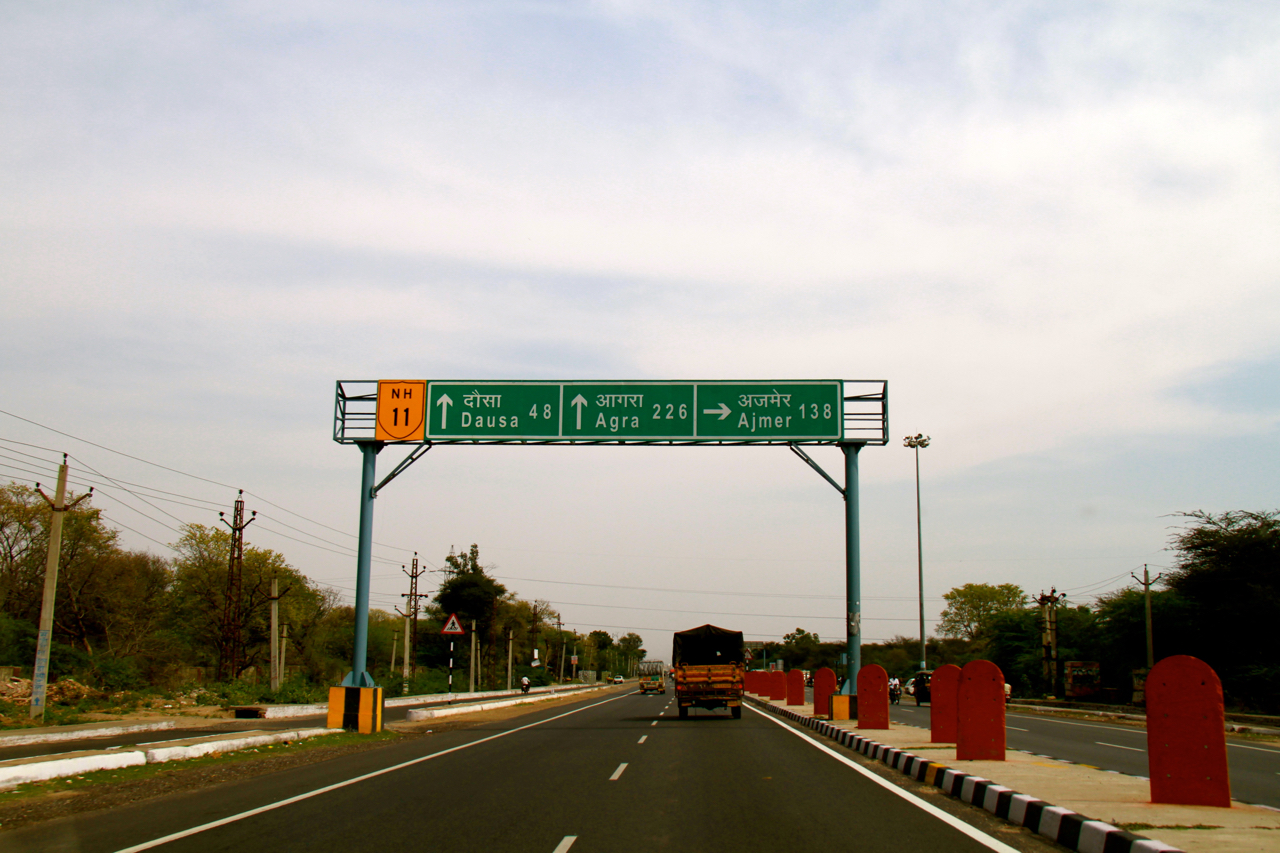
Road sign on NH11 near Ajmer, Rajasthan. This is an example of a Gantry-mounted advance direction ahead of an at-grade junction

Road signs in India are governed by the Indian Roads Congress. For the most part, they tend to follow European practices closely, usually identical to United Kingdom or the Vienna Convention on Road Signs and Signals. However yellow rectangular signs that do carry such messages like "Be gentle on my curves" and "Danger creeps when safety sleeps" are present nationwide.

The official typeface for road signs in India is Transport and Arial. The Official typeface for Highway shields is Highway Gothic. Though sometimes, road signs may use hand-painted fonts. Most urban roads and state highways have signs in the state language and English. National highways have signs in the state language, Hindi and English.

== History ==
From 1963, a circle with a red diagonal slash shows prohibited activities and circles without slashes show rules, blue circles indicate compulsory instructions and triangles with red borders indicate cautions and dangers. Road signs with imperial measures were fully replaced with their metric counterparts.

Prior to 1963, street signs with imperial measurements were used, the warning signage used was triangle above a rectangle which showed dangers and warnings similar to the pre-worboys design used in the United Kingdom and the mandatory signs used were red circles, some with a band such as No Parking and Closed, but some with a rectangular plates that would give written warnings.

== Mandatory/Regulatory signs ==
The mandatory/regulatory signs in India as per the IRC-67 (2022) Guidelines are as follows:

Stop

Stop (in major Indian languages)

Give Way

Give Way to Buses (Exiting the Bus Bay)

Bullock carts prohibited

Bullock cart and hand carts prohibited

Hand carts prohibited

Horse riding prohibited

Tongas prohibited

Buses Prohibited

Trucks prohibited

Cycles prohibited

Pedestrians prohibited

One-way traffic

One-way traffic

No entry

Priority for oncoming vehicles

All motor vehicles prohibited

No vehicles in both directions

Height limit

Width limit

Load limit

Axle load limit

Length limit

Left turn prohibited

Right turn prohibited

Overtaking prohibited

U-Turn Prohibited

Right Turn & And U-Turn Prohibited

Maximum Speed Limit

Stop For Police Check

Horns prohibited

Restriction Ends

No Parking

No Standing

No Stopping

Parking Not Allowed On Footpath

Parking Not Allowed On Half of Footpath

=== Compulsory signs ===
The compulsory signs in India as per the IRC-67 (2022) Guidelines are as follows:

Compulsory Ahead

Compulsory Turn Left

Compulsory Turn Right

Compulsory turn left (In advance of a Junction)

Compulsory turn right (In advance of a Junction)

Compulsory Ahead or turn Right

Compulsory Ahead or turn Left

Compulsory Keep Left

Compulsory Keep Right

Pass Either Side

Mini Roundabout

Compulsory Cycle track/Cycle Only

Compulsory Cyclist and Pedestrian Route

Pedestrian Only

Bus Way/Buses Only

Compulsory Snow Chain

Compulsory Sound Horn

Minimum Speed Limit

== Cautionary/Warning signs ==
The cautionary/ warning signs in India as per the IRC-67 (2022) Guidelines are as follows:

Left curve

Right curve

Right hairpin bend

Left hairpin bend

Right reverse bend

Left reverse bend

Series of Bends

270 Degree Loop

Side road to right

Side road to left

Y-Intersection (Left)

Y-Intersection (Right)

Y-Intersection

Crossroads

Roundabout

Traffic Signals

T-junction

T-junction major road ahead

Major road ahead

Staggered junction

Staggered junction

Merging Traffic ahead from Right

Merging Traffic ahead from Left

Road Narrows Ahead

Road widens

Narrow Bridge Ahead

Steep ascent

Steep descent

Reduced Carriageway Left Lane(s) Reduced

Reduced Carriageway Right Lane(s) Reduced

Start of dual carriageway

End of dual carriageway

Gap in median

Pedestrian crossing

School Ahead

Built-up area

Two Way Operation

Two way Traffic on crossroads Ahead Warning

People At Work

Supplementary plate ''END'' at the leaving side of work zone

Danger warning

Differently Abled Persons Ahead

Deaf Persons Ahead

Blind Persons Ahead

Cycle crossing

Cycle Route Ahead

Dangerous Dip

Speed Breaker

Rumble strip

Rough road

Soft verges

Loose gravel

Slippery road

Slippery road because of Ice

Opening or Swing Bridge

Overhead cables

Quayside or riverbank

Barrier

Sudden Side Winds

Tunnel ahead

Ferry

Trams crossing

Falling rocks

Cattle crossing

Wild Animals

Queues likely ahead

Low-flying aircraft

Unguarded railway crossing

Unguarded railway crossing (50 - 100 Metres Ahead)

Unguarded railway crossing (200 metres ahead)

Guarded railway crossing

Guarded railway crossing (50-100 metres ahead)

Guarded railway crossing (200 metres ahead)

U-Turn Ahead

Single Chevron

Double chevron

Triple chevron

Object Hazard (Left)

Object Hazard (Right)

Two Way Object Hazard Marker

== Informatory signs ==
The informatory signs in India as per the IRC-67 (2022) Guidelines are as follows:

Stack-type advance direction sign

Map-type advance direction sign

Roundabout

Flag-type direction sign

Confirmatory sign

Place identification sign

Truck-lay by

Weigh bridge ahead

Gantry-mounted advance direction sign ahead of a grade-separated junction

Gantry-mounted advance direction ahead of an at-grade junction

Lane dedicated gantry sign

Shoulder-mounted sign in advance of grade-separated junction

Expressway Ahead

Gantry-mounted advance direction sign ahead of a flyover in urban/city roads

Supplementary road sign ''No parking''

Supplementary road sign ''No stopping No standing''

Crash Prone Area

== Facility informatory signs ==
The facility information signs in India as per the IRC-67 (2022) Guidelines are as follows:

Eating Place

Light Refreshment

Resting Place

First Aid Post

Toilet

Filling Station (Fuel Pump)

Hospital

Emergency SOS Facility

U-Turn Ahead

Pedestrian Subway

Foot Over Bridge

Chair Lift

Police Station

Repair Facility

Railway Station/Metro Station/Monorail Station

Cycle Rickshaw Stand

Taxi Stand

Auto-rickshaw Stand

Shared Taxi/Share Auto Stand

Home Zone

Camp Site

Airport

Golf Course

National Heritage

No Through Road

No Through Side Road

Toll Road Ahead

ETC Lane Guide

Country Border

Entry Ramp for Expressway

Exit Ramp for Expressway

Expressway Symbol

End of Expressway

Bus Stop

Bus Lane

Contra Flow Bus Lane

Cycle Lane

Contra Flow Cycle Lane

Holiday Chalets

Emergency Exit (a)

Emergency Exit (b)

Emergency Helpline Number (a)

Emergency Helpline Number (b)

Emergency Lay-by

Fire Extinguisher

Rest and Service Area (a)

Rest and Service Area (b)

Pedestrian Crossing

Speed Breaker

Electric Vehicle Charging Station

=== Parking signs ===
The parking signs in India as per the IRC-67 (2022) Guidelines are as follows:

Parking

Auto Rickshaw Parking

Cycle Parking

Cycle Rickshaw Parking

Scooter and Motorcycle Parking

Taxi Parking

Car Parking

Park and Ride (By Metro)

Park and Ride (By Bus)

Pick Up & Drop Point

Parking Restriction Sign for Traffic Management (a)

Parking Restriction Sign for Traffic Management (b)

Parking Restriction Sign for Traffic Management (c)

Flood Gauge

=== Route Marker signs ===
The Route Marker signs in India as per the IRC-67 (2022) Guidelines are as follows:

State Highway Route Marker

National Highway Route Marker

Asian Highway Route Marker

National Expressway Route Marker

== Retired signs ==
=== 1939 road signs ===
Road signs used from 1939 to 1963, before metrification.

==== Regulatory signs ====
Speed limit

Weight limit

Road closed

Mandatory direction

No parking

Overtaking prohibited

Horns prohibited

Slow down, main road ahead

==== Warning signs ====
Bumpy road

Right reverse bend

Left reverse bend

Crossroads

Guarded railway crossing

Unguarded railway crossing

Right curve

Left curve

School

T-junction

Side road to right

Side road to left

Steep descent

Ferry

Right hairpin bend

Left hairpin bend

Narrow bridge

Bumpy road

Right reverse bend

Left reverse bend

Crossroads

Guarded railway crossing

Unguarded railway crossing

Right curve

Left curve

School

T-junction

Side road to right

Side road to left

Steep descent

Ferry

Right hairpin bend

Left hairpin bend

Narrow bridge

=== 1977 road signs ===
==== Mandatory/Regulatory signs ====
===== Stop and Give Way signs =====
Stop (before 2001)

Give way (before 2001)

===== Prohibitory signs =====
No entry

One-way traffic

One-way traffic

No vehicles in both directions

No motor vehicles (before 2001)

No trucks

No bullock and hand carts

No bullock carts

No tonga carts

No hand carts

No cycles (before 2001)

No pedestrians (before 2001)

No left turn

No right turn

No U-turn

No overtaking

No horns

No parking

No standing or stopping

Speed limit

Width limit

Height limit

Length limit

Load limit

Axle load limit

===== Restriction ends signs =====
Restriction ends

===== Compulsory signs =====
Turn left

Turn right

Ahead only

Turn left ahead

Turn right ahead

Ahead or turn left

Ahead or turn right

Keep left

Cycle track (before 2001)

Sound horn

==== Cautionary/Warning signs ====
Left curve (before 2001)

Right curve (before 2001)

Left hairpin bend (before 2001)

Right hairpin bend (before 2001)

Crossroads

Left side road

Right side road

T-junction

Y-junction

Y-junction

Y-junction

Slippery road

Loose gravel

Cycle crossing (before 2001)

Pedestrian crossing

School

Cattle crossing (before 2001)

Roadwork

Falling rocks

Ferry

Narrow bridge

Road narrows

Road widens

Gap in median

Dip

Bumpy road

Barrier

Unguarded railway crossing

Guarded railway crossing

Staggered junction

Staggered junction

Major road ahead

Major road ahead

Roundabout
