= Speed limits in India =

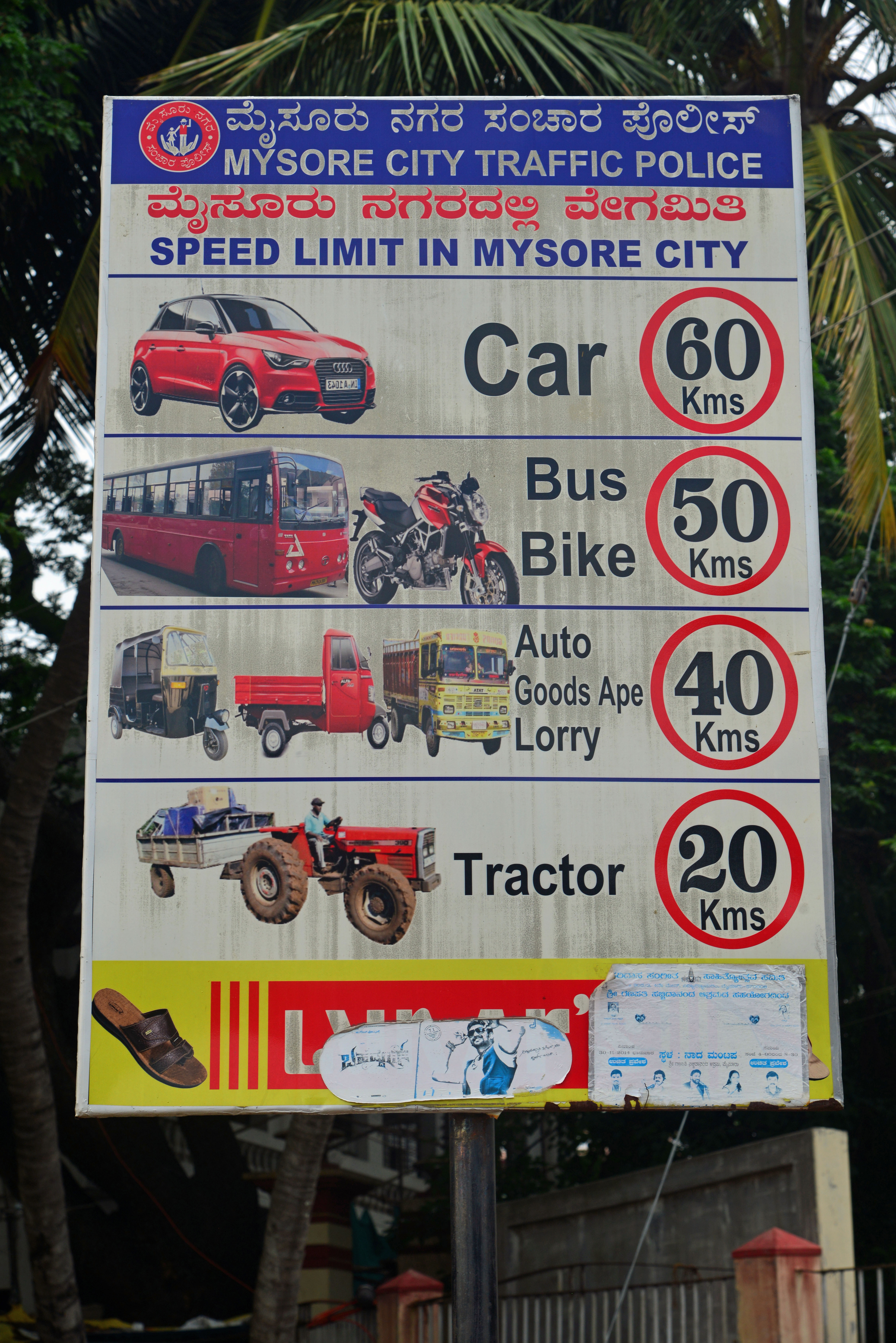
Speed limits in the city of Mysore, Karnataka

Speed limits in India vary by state and vehicle type. In April 2018, the Union Ministry of Road Transport and Highways fixed the maximum speed limit on expressways and national highway are at 120 km/h and for urban roads at 70 km/h for M1 category of vehicles. The M1 category includes most passenger vehicles which have fewer than 8 seats. State and local governments in India may fix lower speed limits than those prescribed by the Union Ministry.

State	Motorcycle	Light motor vehicle (cars)	Medium passenger vehicle	Medium goods vehicle	Heavy vehicle/Articulated vehicle	Vehicle pulling 1 trailer	Vehicle pulling multiple trailers	All other vehicles
Andhra Pradesh / Telangana State	50	No default limit (65 for transport vehicles)	65	65	40/50	60 (50 if trailer > 800 kg)	50	30
Maharashtra	50	No default limit (65 for transport vehicles)	65	65	65	50	50	50
Delhi	30-70	25-50	20-40	20-40	20-40	20-40	20-40	20–40
Uttar Pradesh	40	40	40	40	20-40	20-40	20-40	
Haryana	30/50	50	40/65	40/65	30/40	35/60	40/60	20/30
Karnataka	50	No limit (60 for cars in Bengaluru except in Airport road where it is 80, 100 for cars only on NH 66 between Mangalore and Udupi) (65 for transport vehicles)	60 (KSRTC)	60	60	40/60	40/60	
Odisha	60 (4 lane or above divided carriageway), 40 (NH & SH passing through Municipal area), 50 (others)	40 (4 lane or above divided carriageway), 30 (NH & SH passing through Municipal area), 30 (others)	100 (4 lane or above divided carriageway), 50 (NH & SH passing through Municipal area), 60 (others)	60 (4 lane or above divided carriageway), 30 (NH & SH passing through Municipal area), 50 (others)	60 (4 lane or above divided carriageway), 30 (NH & SH passing through Municipal area), 50 (others)			
Punjab	35/50	50/70/80	45/50/65					30
Tamil Nadu	60	80 100 for four line high ways / 120 for six line high ways						
Kerala	30 (Near School) / 45 (In Ghat roads) / 50 (City/State Highway/ All other places) / 70(National Highway) / 80 (4-lane highway)	50 (City); 70 (All other places); 80 (State Highway); 90 (National Highway); 100 (4-lane highway); 110 (6lane NH)	30-40 (Near School /In Ghat roads / City) / 50-65 (All other places / State Highway / National Highway) 70 (4-lane highway)	30-40 (Near School /In Ghat roads / City) / 50-65 (All other places / State Highway / National Highway) 70 (4-lane highway)	30 (Near School /In Ghat roads) / 40 (All other places /City) / 60 ( State Highway / National Highway) / 65 (4-lane highway)	25-30 (Near School /In Ghat roads) / 40-50 (All other places /City) / 60 ( State Highway / National Highway / 4-lane highway)	25-30 (Near School /In Ghat roads) / 60 (All other places ) / 40 - 50( State Highway / National Highway / 4-lane highway / City)	25-30
