= Laxmi Kanta Mohapatra =

2nd Chief Justice of Manipur High Court (2014 - 2016)

Hon'ble Chief Justice (Retd.) Laxmi Kanta Mohapatra
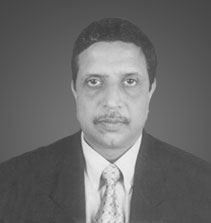

2nd Chief Justice of Manipur High Court
- In office 10 July 2014 – 9 June 2016; Acting CJ : 21 October 2013 - 9 July 2014
- Nominated by: R. M. Lodha
- Appointed by: Pranab Mukherjee
- Preceded by: Abhay Manohar Sapre
- Succeeded by: Rakesh Ranjan Prasad

Judge of Allahabad High Court
- In office 17 October 2012 – 20 October 2013
- Nominated by: S. H. Kapadia
- Appointed by: Pranab Mukherjee
- Acting Chief Justice
- In office 19 September 2013 – 20 October 2013
- Appointed by: Pranab Mukherjee
- Preceded by: Shiva Kirti Singh
- Succeeded by: D. Y. Chandrachud; Sheo Kumar Singh (acting)

Judge of Orissa High Court
- In office 16 September 1999 – 16 October 2012
- Nominated by: K. R. Narayanan
- Appointed by: A. S. Anand

Personal details
- Born: 10 June 1954 (age 72)
- Education: M S Law College, Cuttack

Laxmi Kanta Mohapatra (born 10 June 1954) is a retired Indian judge, who has served as Chief Justice of Manipur High Court. He is a former judge of Allahabad High Court and Orissa High Court.

== Career ==
Justice Mohapatra was born in 1954. His father Late Lokanath Mohapatra retired as District Judge. He passed Law from M S Law College of Cuttack in 1977. He enrolled as Advocate on 25 January 1978 and started practice on Civil, Criminal, Service and Labour matters in Orissa High Court. He served as the legal retainer for South Eastern Railway, Industrial Promotion & Investment Corporation of Odisha, Odisha State Financial Corporation, Stock Exchange and other organizations in the High Court.

He was elevated as judge of the Orissa High Court on 16 September 1999. He was transferred to Allahabad High Court on 17 October 2012 and took charge as the Acting Chief Justice of Allahabad High Court from 19 September to 20 October 2013. He was transferred as Acting Chief Justice of Manipur High Court and took charge of the same n 21 October 2013. Subsequently he was elevated in the post of the Chief Justice of Manipur High Court on 10 July 2014.
