= Shorey =

- Anil Shorey, Indian infantry officer and writer, official spokesman for the Indian army
- Ankita Shorey, Indian actress and former model
- Arun Shourie, Indian author and intellectual
- Dan Shorey, former Grand Prix motorcycle road racer
- Dhruv Shorey, Indian cricketer
- H. D. Shourie (1911–2005), Indian consumer activist
- Konrad Shourie, Canadian police officer
- Meena Shorey (1921–1989), Indian and Pakistani actress
- Mona Shourie Kapoor (1964–2012), Indian producer
- Nalini Singh (born Nalini Shourie), Indian journalist, daughter of H. D. Shourie
- Nicky Shorey (born 1981), English footballer
- Pablo Shorey (born 1983), male wrestler from Cuba
- Paul Shorey (1857–1934), American classical scholar
- Tarlok Nath Shorey, Indian mathematician
- Ranvir Shorey (born 1972), Indian actor and former VJ
- William T. Shorey (1859–1919), late 19th Century American whaling ship captain

== See also ==
- Shorey House (disambiguation)
- Sherrey
- Shorea
