= Siddharth Mridul =

7th Chief Justice of Manipur High Court

Hon'ble Chief Justice (Retd.) Siddharth Mridul
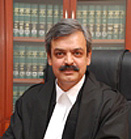

7th Chief Justice of Manipur High Court
- In office 20 October 2023 – 21 November 2024
- Nominated by: D. Y. Chandrachud
- Appointed by: Droupadi Murmu
- Preceded by: P. V. Sanjay Kumar; M. V. Muralidaran (acting)
- Succeeded by: D. Krishnakumar

Judge of Delhi High Court
- In office 13 March 2008 – 19 October 2023
- Nominated by: K. G. Balakrishnan
- Appointed by: Pratibha Patil

Personal details
- Born: 22 November 1962 (age 63)
- Relations: Sandhya Mridul (sister)
- Parent: Pushp Raj Mridul
- Education: B.A and LL.B
- Alma mater: Hindu College, Delhi, Faculty of Law, University of Delhi

Siddharth Mridul (born 22 November 1962) is a retired Indian judge, who has served as Chief Justice of Manipur High Court from 2023 to 2024. He is a former judge of Delhi High Court.

== Early life ==
He was born on 22 November 1962 to Justice P. R. Mridul. His father Pushp Raj Mridul was additional judge of Bombay High Court and actress Sandhya Mridul is his sister. He did his schooling from Army Public School and graduation from Hindu College, Delhi in 1983. He completed his LL.B from Faculty of Law, University of Delhi in 1986 and enrolled as advocate with Bar Council of Delhi on 24 July 1986.

== Career ==
He started practising as advocate in Delhi High Court and also appeared in various other high courts such as Bombay, Karnataka, and Rajasthan as well as before various tribunals.

He was appointed as Standing Counsel for Union of India in 2004 and as Senior Panel Counsel in February 2006. He was designated as Senior Advocate in May 2006. He was elected as member of the Bar Council of Delhi for two terms 1992-1998 and 1998-2003 and served as the Honorary Secretary to the Bar Council of Delhi from 1994 to 1997 and as the Vice Chairman from 1998 to 2003.

He was appointed as Additional Judge of the Delhi High Court on 13 March 2008 and became Permanent Judge on 26 May 2009.

In July 2023, Supreme court collegium recommended his appointment as Chief Justice of Manipur High Court. In October 2023 government cleared this recommendation and he was appointed as the Chief Justice of Manipur High Court on 20 October 2023. He retired on 21 November 2024 after serving 13 months as chief justice of Manipur High Court.
