= D. Krishnakumar =

8th Chief Justice of Manipur High Court

Hon'ble Chief Justice (Retd.) Deivasigamani Krishnakumar
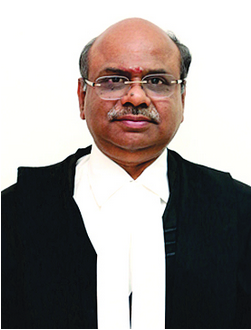

8th Chief Justice of Manipur High Court
- In office 22 November 2024 – 21 May 2025
- Nominated by: Sanjiv Khanna
- Appointed by: Droupadi Murmu
- Preceded by: Siddharth Mridul
- Succeeded by: K. Somashekar

Judge of Madras High Court
- In office 7 April 2016 – 21 November 2024
- Nominated by: Tirath Singh Thakur
- Appointed by: Pranab Mukherjee
- Acting Chief Justice
- In office 18 July 2024 – 26 September 2024
- Appointed by: Droupadi Murmu
- Preceded by: S. V. Gangapurwala; R. Mahadevan (acting)
- Succeeded by: K. R. Shriram

Personal details
- Born: 22 May 1963 (age 63) Dharapuram
- Education: B.Sc and LL.B
- Alma mater: Presidency College, Chennai, Madras Law College

Deivasigamani Krishnakumar (born 22 May 1963) is a retired Indian judge. He was the 8th Chief Justice of Manipur High Court. He is a former Judge of Madras High Court.

== Life and career ==
He was born on 22 May 1963 at Dharapuram and completed schooling from government higher secondary school at Dharapuram. He did his graduation from Presidency College, Chennai and LL.B from Madras Law College. He enrolled as advocate in 1987 and joined chambers of senior advocate K. Duraiswamy.

He was appointed as a Government Advocate in Madras High Court from 1991 to 1996. He also served as Additional Central Government Standing Counsel from 1998 to 1999 and Special Government Pleader from 2001 to 2006. He was also appointed as Special Government pleader (education) from 2013 till his appointed as judge.

On7 April 2016 he was appointed as judge of the Madras High Court and also served as its acting chief justice in mid 2024 due to the elevation of the then acting chief justice R. Mahadevan to Supreme Court of India.

In November 2024, Supreme court collegium led by the then newly appointed CJI Sanjiv Khanna recommended his elevation as chief justice of Manipur High Court and within 48 hours of recommendation government cleared his appointment and he was sworn in as chief justice on 22 November 2024. He retired in May 2025 after serving six month tenure as Manipur Chief Justice.
