= Kalpathi Rajendran Shriram =

43rd Chief Justice of Rajasthan High Court

Hon'ble Chief Justice Kalpathi Rajendran Shriram (Retd)

43rd Chief Justice of Rajasthan High Court
- In office 21 July 2025 – 27 September 2025
- Nominated by: B. R. Gavai
- Appointed by: Droupadi Murmu
- Preceded by: M. M. Shrivastava
- Succeeded by: S. K. Agrawal; S. P. Sharma (acting)

45th Chief Justice of Madras High Court
- In office 27 September 2024 – 20 July 2025
- Nominated by: D. Y. Chandrachud
- Appointed by: Droupadi Murmu
- Preceded by: S. V. Gangapurwala; R. Mahadevan (acting); D. Krishnakumar (acting)
- Succeeded by: M. M. Shrivastava

Judge of the Bombay High Court
- In office 21 June 2013 – 26 September 2024
- Nominated by: Altamas Kabir
- Appointed by: Pranab Mukherjee

Personal details
- Born: 28 September 1963 Mumbai
- Education: B. Com., LLB., M.L.,
- Alma mater: University of Mumbai, Mumbai, King's College, London

Kalpathi Rajendran Shriram also known K.R.Shriram (born 28 September 1963) is a retired Indian judge who served as Chief justice of Rajasthan High Court. He previously served as the Chief Justice of Madras High Court. He has also served as a judge of Bombay High Court.

== Early life ==
Shriram was born on 28 September 1963 in Mumbai to Kalpathi Rajendran of Kerala state. Shriram studied Bachelor of Commerce (Financial Accountancy and Management) and LLB from University of Mumbai. He later obtained a master's degree in maritime law from King's College London.

== As lawyer ==
Shriram enrolled as an advocate in the Maharashtra and Goa Bar Association on 3 July 1986, to practice law. Then he took practice with Senior Advocate S. Venkateswaran as a junior lawyer. In the next year, he individually attended cases related to commercial matters with specialization in Shipping and International Trade Law.

== As judge ==
Siriram was appointed as additional judge of the Bombay High Court on 21 June 2013 and confirmed as permanent judge of the Bombay High Court on 2 March 2016. The Centre notified the appointment of K. R. Shiriram as Chief Justice of Madras High Court on September 21, 2024.

On 26 May 2025 the Supreme Court collegium recommended swapping the chief justices of Rajasthan High Court and Madras High Court and subsequently he was transferred as Chief Justice of Rajasthan High Court.
