= Industrial Promotion & Investment Corporation of Odisha =

Industrial Promotion & Investment Corporation of Odisha Limited
- Company type: Government
- Industry: Industrial Promotion & Investment
- Founded: 1973
- Headquarters: IPICOL House, Bhubaneswar, Odisha, India
- Area served: Odisha
- Key people: Shri Hemant Sharma; IAS, Chairman
- Products: Pig Iron, High Speed Steel, Aluminium Extrusions, Aluminium Powder, Aluminium Rolled Products, Cement, Textile, Paper, Industrial Gases, Synthetic Fibres, Granite, Refractory & More
- Owner: Government of Odisha

The Industrial Promotion & Investment Corporation of Odisha Limited or IPICOL was incorporated on April 12, 1973 by the Government of Odisha to promote medium and large scale industries in the state by providing necessary support services including equity participation and long term financial assistance.

IPICOL has been designated as the State Level Nodal Agency (SLNA) under section 8 of Odisha Industries (Facilitation) Act, 2004 by Government of Odisha, Industries Department. Further, as per Industrial Policy Resolution (IPR), 2007, IPR-2015, IPR-2022 of Government of Odisha, IPICOL, as the SLNA has been further strengthened as Investment Promotion Agency (IPA) to function as an effective one stop shop for investors.

== Key activities ==
The main activity of IPCOL is to make Odisha an investment destination in the identified focus sectors. It also has to develop and maintain various apps, roadshows, events, exhibitions and print medias to bolster the investment scenario of the state.

== Supporting organizations ==
- Agricultural Promotion and Investment Corporation Of Odisha Limited
- Industrial Development Corporation of Odisha Limited
- Odisha Film Development Corporation
- Odisha Industrial Infrastructure Development Corporation
- Odisha Small Industries Corporation
- Odisha State Financial Corporation
