= R. Mahadevan =

Judge of the Supreme Court of India

Hon'ble Justice R. Mahadevan
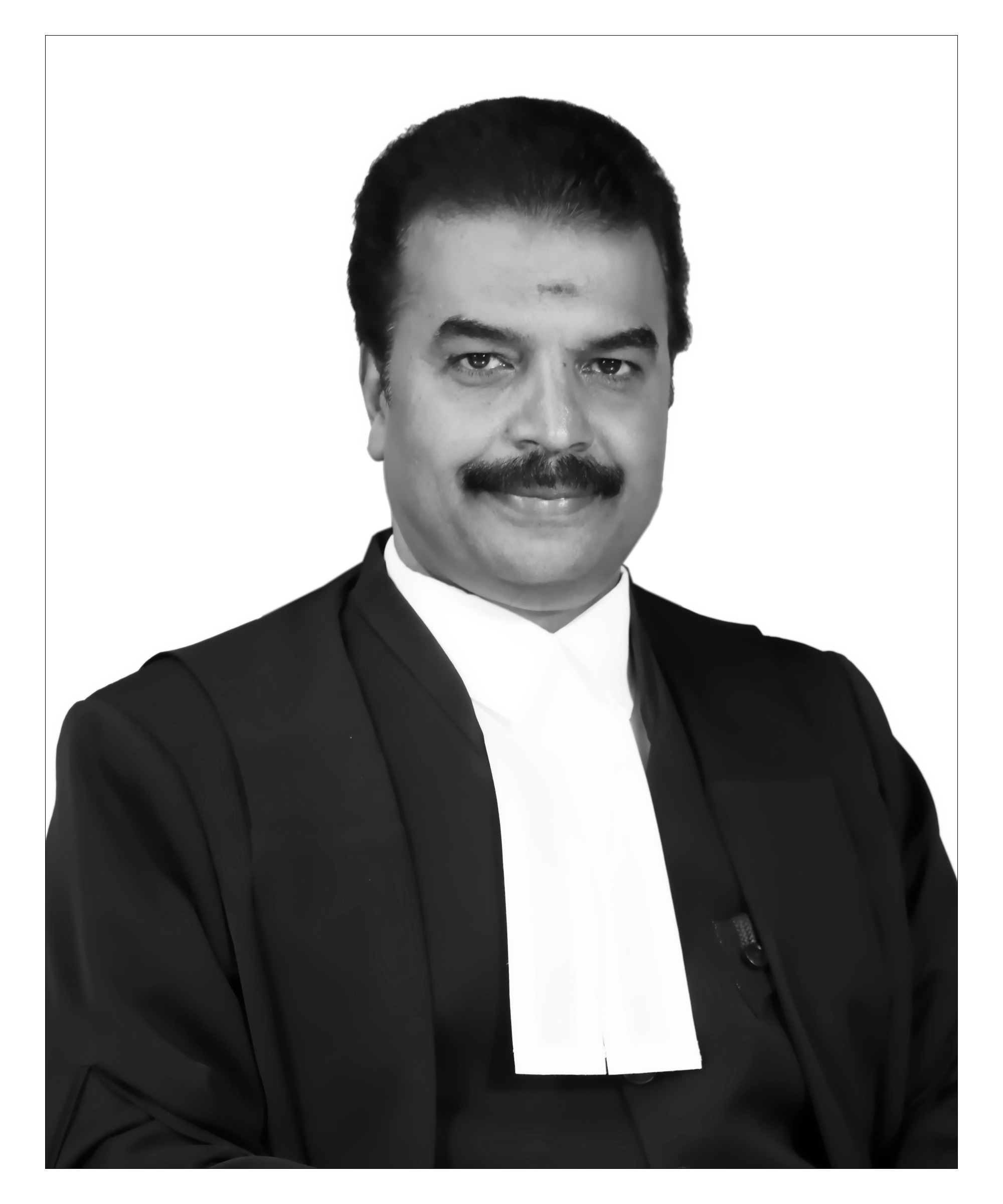

Judge of Supreme Court of India
- Incumbent
- Assumed office 18 July 2024
- Nominated by: Dhananjaya Y. Chandrachud
- Appointed by: Droupadi Murmu

Acting Chief Justice of Madras High Court
- In office 24 May 2024 – 17 July 2024
- Appointed by: Droupadi Murmu
- Preceded by: Sanjay Vijaykumar Gangapurwala
- Succeeded by: D. Krishnakumar (acting); Kalpathi Rajendran Shriram

Judge of Madras High Court
- In office 25 October 2013 – 23 May 2024
- Nominated by: P. Sathasivam
- Appointed by: Pranab Mukherjee

Personal details
- Born: 10 June 1963 (age 63) Madras, Madras State (now Chennai, Tamil Nadu), India
- Parent: M. Aranganathan (father)
- Education: Madras Law College

R. Mahadevan (born 10 June 1963) is a judge of the Supreme Court of India. He is a former judge of Madras High Court, where he also served as the Acting Chief Justice.

== Career ==
Mahadevan was born on 10 June 1963 to Tamil writer M. Aranganathan (1931-2017) in present-day Chennai, Tamil Nadu. He completed his law degree at Madras Law College, Chennai. After completing his law degree, he enrolled with the bar council of Chennai in 1989. Civil, criminal and writ sides with specialization in indirect taxes, customs and Central Excise matters are the areas where he had rich experience for more than 25 years. He also served as an Additional Government Pleader (Taxes) for the Government of Tamil Nadu. He was appointed as a judge of the Madras High Court in 2013.

On 24 May 2024, he was appointed as Acting Chief Justice of Madras High Court after the retirement of Chief Justice Sanjay V. Gangapurwala.

On 18 July 2024, he was appointed as a judge of Supreme Court of India.

== See also ==
- Madras High Court
- High Courts of India
