= Amba Prasad =

Amba Prasad may refer to:

- Amba Prasad (businessman), Indian businessman and philanthropist
- Amba Prasad (politician), Indian politician
- Sufi Amba Prasad, Indian nationalist and pan-Islamist leader
