= Dinesh Karthik =

Indian cricket commentator, coach and former cricketer (born 1985)

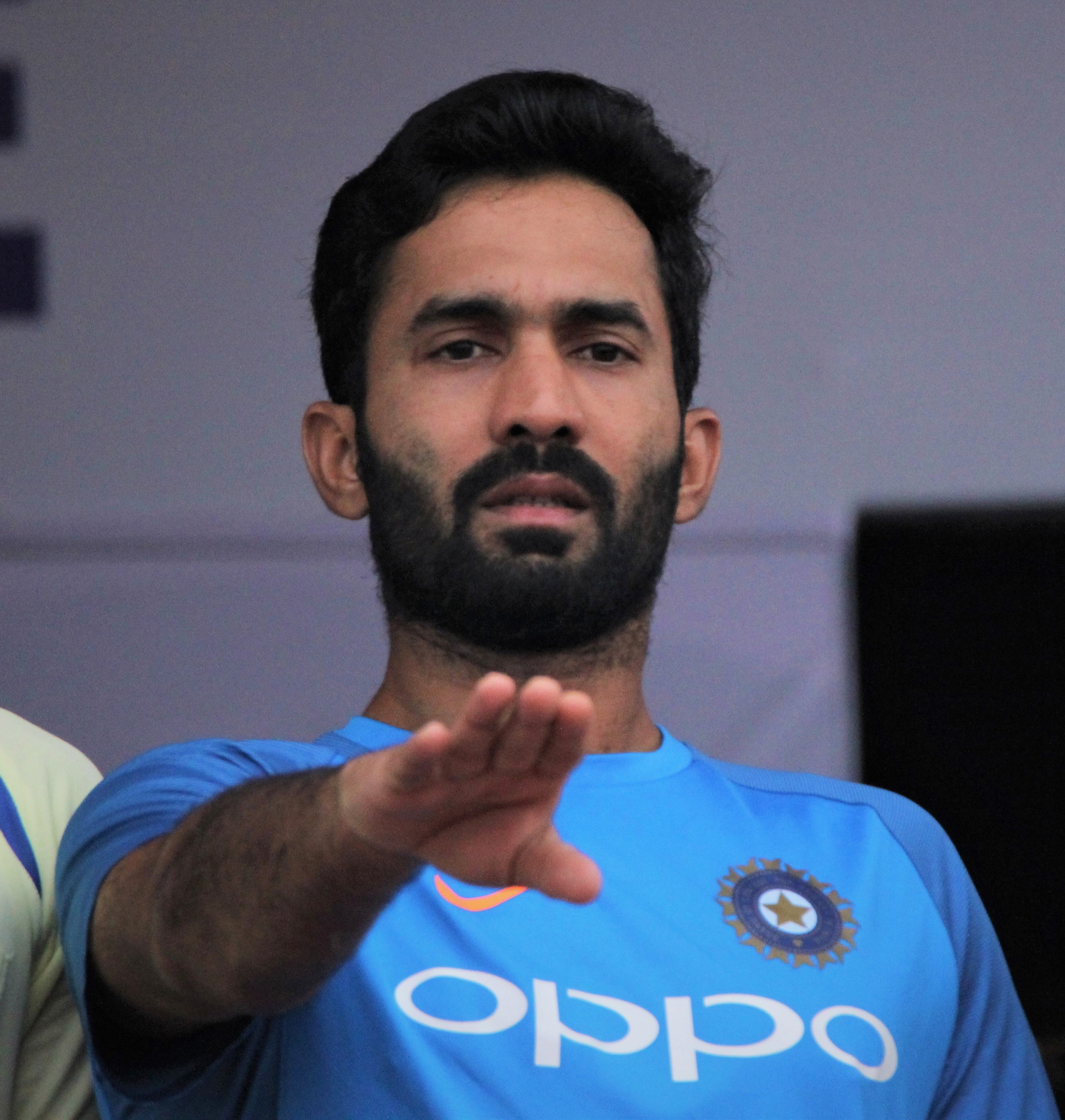
- Karthik in 2017

Personal information
- Full name: Krishnakumar Dinesh Karthik
- Born: 1 June 1985 (age 41); Madras, Tamil Nadu, India
- Nickname: DK
- Batting: Right-handed
- Bowling: Right-arm off break
- Role: Wicket-keeper-batter
- Relatives: Dipika Pallikal (m. 2015)

International information
- National side: India (2004–2022)
- Test debut (cap 250): 3 November 2004 v Australia
- Last Test: 9 August 2018 v England
- ODI debut (cap 156): 5 September 2004 v England
- Last ODI: 10 July 2019 v New Zealand
- ODI shirt no.: 21
- T20I debut (cap 4): 1 December 2006 v South Africa
- Last T20I: 2 November 2022 v Bangladesh
- T20I shirt no.: 19

Domestic team information
- Years: Team
- 2002–2024: Tamil Nadu
- 2008–2010, 2014: Delhi Daredevils
- 2011: Kings XI Punjab
- 2012–2013: Mumbai Indians
- 2015, 2022–2024: Royal Challengers Bengaluru
- 2016–2017: Gujarat Lions
- 2018–2021: Kolkata Knight Riders
- 2025: Paarl Royals

Career statistics
Competition	Test	ODI	T20I	FC
Matches	26	94	60	167
Runs scored	1,025	1,752	686	9,620
Batting average	25.00	30.21	26.38	40.93
100s/50s	1/7	0/9	0/1	28/43
Top score	129*	79	55	213
Catches/stumpings	57/6	64/7	30/8	387/45
Medal record
Men's cricket
Representing India
ICC T20 World Cup
Winner	2007 South Africa
ICC Champions Trophy
Winner	2013 England & Wales
Runner-up	2017 England & Wales
ACC Asia Cup
Winner	2010 Sri Lanka
Winner	2018 UAE
ACC U19 Asia Cup
Winner	2003 Pakistan
- Source: ESPNcricinfo, 8 December 2025

Krishnakumar Dinesh Karthik (born 1 June 1985) is an Indian cricket commentator, coach and former international cricketer. Karthik played for the India national cricket team and also captained Tamil Nadu in domestic cricket. He is currently the mentor and batting coach for Royal Challengers Bengaluru in the Indian Premier League and London Spirit in The Hundred.

Karthik made his debut for the Indian cricket team in 2004. He was the 4th Indian batsman to play 300 T20 matches. Karthik was a member of the team that won both the inaugural 2007 T20 World Cup and the 2013 ICC Champions Trophy. Karthik is also the first Indian ever to win a Player of The Match award in a T20 International, having done so in 2006. Known for his six hitting ability, aggressive batting style, longevity and ability to finish games strong, Karthik was viewed as a crucial asset in the IPL and the India national cricket team for almost two decades.

Karthik made his maiden Test century against Bangladesh and was India's leading scorer in their 2007 Test tour of England, helping India win their first series in England in 21 years. After a drop in form in September 2007, Karthik was dropped from the Test team and only made sporadic international appearances through 2022

Between 2018 and 2020, Karthik was the captain of IPL team Kolkata Knight Riders. He also occasionally worked as a commentator for British channel Sky Sports, most notably during India's 2021 tour of England.

== Early life ==
Dinesh Karthik was born on 1 June 1985 at Chennai, India. He began playing cricket at the age of 10. He did his initial schooling at Carmel School and Fahaheel Al-Watanieh School in Kuwait and at Don Bosco School in Egmore from class eight. He was coached in cricket by his father, who was a first-division cricketer. His father encouraged him to take up cricket, after his career itself was cut short due to his educational commitments. Karthik honed his reflexes by having his father throw hard leather balls at him at high speed. He initially trained as a batsman and took to wicket-keeping later, when he represented the Tamil Nadu youth teams.

== Early career ==
Karthik made his Tamil Nadu under-14 debut in early 1999, and was promoted to the under-19 team at the beginning of the 2000/2001 season. He made his first-class debut for the senior team the following season.

== International career ==
=== Early career (2004-2008) ===
Test cricket

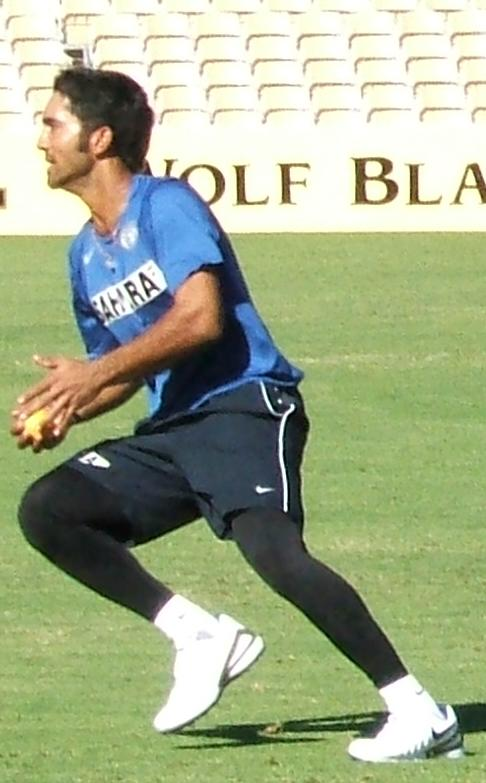
Karthik at fielding practice

Karthik made his Test cricket debut in the fourth Test between Australia and India in Mumbai in October 2004, replacing Parthiv Patel (who was dropped for poor wicket-keeping). He scored 14 runs in two innings and took two catches, but was praised for his wicket-keeping on a pitch with variable bounce and spin on which 40 wickets fell in two days.

Karthik was retained for India's next engagement: a two-Test home series against South Africa. In a high-scoring draw where both teams passed 450 in the first innings, Karthik managed only a solitary run in the first Test in Kanpur. In the second Test at Kolkata, he scored 46 runs to help extend India's first innings lead to 106 runs for the host's eight-wicket win.

Karthik had a chance to score highly in India's two-Test tour of Bangladesh in December 2004. Against a team which had never won a Test, India swept the series and won both matches by an innings. Although his team exceeded 500 in both matches, Karthik scored only 25 and 11.

However, he was retained for the three-Test series at home against Pakistan in March. In a high-scoring draw in the first Test in Mohali, Karthik scored only six of India's 516 runs. He then had his best Test batting performance to date, at Eden Gardens in Kolkata against Pakistan. India batted first; Karthik made a start and reached 28, before being run out. India made 407 and Pakistan almost broke even, replying with 393. Karthik scored in the second innings, joining Rahul Dravid in a 166-run partnership to set up a target of 422. The pitch was deteriorating, and India won the match by 196 runs. In the next match, Karthik made only 10 and nine as India collapsed and lost ten wickets on the final day of an otherwise high-scoring match; 1,280 runs had been scored for only 22 wickets in the first three innings.

Dhoni scored 148 in an ODI against Pakistan, and he replaced Karthik for the three Tests at home against Sri Lanka. In ten tests since his debut, Karthik scored 245 runs for an average of 18.84 with one half-century and one other score above 25. He was selected as a back-up wicket-keeper and middle-order batsmen on the Test team in November 2006.

After Dhoni injured a finger, Karthik replaced him for the third Test at Newlands against South Africa for his first Test in over a year. He opened the innings with Wasim Jaffer, allowing Sehwag to bat in the middle order. He used his domestic experience to score 63 in the first innings, combining in a century opening stand and helping India to 414 (enough for a first-innings lead of 41). In the second innings, Karthik scored an unbeaten 38 as the team were all out for 169. In addition to his batting, his wicket-keeping was praised.

Although he did not play a match at the 2007 ICC Cricket World Cup, after a roster reshuffle Karthik was selected as a specialist opener for a tour of Bangladesh. He scored 56 and 22 in the drawn first Test in Chittagong before scoring his maiden Test century in the second Test in Dhaka, making 129 runs and featuring in a century opening stand as India took an innings victory.

Karthik was a regular opener in the mid-2007 Test series in England. After scoring 76 and 51 in the two tour matches before the Tests, he recorded a half-century in each of the three Tests. In the first Test at Lord's, Karthik made 60 in the second innings before India fell to 9/282 (in pursuit of 380) when rain ended the match early. In the second Test at Trent Bridge, Karthik scored 77 and 22; in the third Test at the Oval, he scored 91. With a total of 263 runs at 43.83, he was the highest scorer in the series for India (who won their first series in England in 21 years). Karthik started the ODI series with an unbeaten 44, but had four consecutive innings where he failed to score more than four runs and was dropped for the final two matches.

He had a lean Test series against Pakistan at home in late 2008. Karthik managed only 39 in two innings of the first two Tests, exceeding single figures only once. In the third Test in Bangalore, Sachin Tendulkar was injured; his replacement, Yuvraj, scored 170. Karthik, batting down the order, scored 24 and 52 in a high-scoring draw and kept the wickets because of Dhoni's injury. In the first innings, Karthik was behind the stumps as India set a world record for the most extras conceded in a Test innings; the 35 byes were the secondmost in Test history.

Karthik was retained for the Test tour of Australia as an opener, and Gambhir was out with an injury. He did not play in the first two Tests, however, because Dravid was elevated to his opening position so Tendulkar and Yuvraj could bat in the middle order. When Dravid and Yuvraj struggled in their new positions, Dravid was moved back to his number-three position and Yuvraj was dropped for the series' third Test; Karthik was not recalled.

He was recalled to the Test team as a wicket-keeper for the July 2008 tour of Sri Lanka when Dhoni took a sabbatical due to fatigue. Karthik played in the first two Tests, but struggled with the bat in the middle order. He scored 36 runs at 9.00, falling all four times to the spinners Muttiah Muralitharan and Ajantha Mendis.

He scored an unbeaten 117 against Kerala in the 2009 one-day tournament and was selected for the tour of New Zealand as reserve wicket-keeper. After watching the T20 and ODI series, Karthik played in the second Test when Dhoni was injured; he was criticised for dropping a number of catches.

Karthik then played in the first Test at Chittagong after Dhoni was injured again. He made a duck in the first innings and 27 in the second, watching the next match after Dhoni returned.

He scored 183 and 150 in the Duleep Trophy final against West Zone, the third player to score centuries in both innings of a Duleep Trophy final.

Limited overs cricket

Dinesh Karthik made his debut match in 2004 against England at Lord's in the last match of ODI series, scoring just one run. Despite dropping England captain Michael Vaughan from Anil Kumble's bowling, he eventually stumped Vaughan down the legside and took another catch. Karthik played in the 2004 ICC Champions Trophy against Kenya, taking three catches before being replaced on the ODI team by MS Dhoni. He did not play another ODI until April 2006.

In April 2006, Karthik was recalled to the ODI team to give Dhoni a rest in the final ODI against England in Indore. He was not required to bat, as India cruised to a seven-wicket victory. Karthik was then reinstated as reserve wicket-keeper for the tour of the West Indies after scoring 134 runs for India A at 33.50, including a man-of-the-match 75 runs against the UAE. He had more opportunities at the international level later that year during the ODI tour of South Africa after Yuvraj Singh was injured. As a batsman in three of the ODIs, Karthik struggled with 42 runs at an average of 14.00 and a top score of 17 as South Africa took a 5–0 whitewash.

Dinesh Karthik's 15-year-old career includes 94 ODIs, and 32 T20s. He has kept wickets for the Indian team in ICC events and crucial trophies, both ODIs as well as T20Is. Karthik averages best in T20s 33.25 with a strike rate of 143.52. While he was snubbed in ODIs after ICC World Cup 2019, Karthik is well in contention for 2022 ICC Men's T20 World Cup. He scored an unbeaten 31 to steer India to a six-wicket win in the Twenty20 International against South Africa, with one ball to spare, in 2007. Karthik then featured in the four-match ODI series against West Indies. After not batting in the victorious first match, he top-scored with 63 as a specialist batsman when India recovered from 35/3 to post 189 on a slow wicket at the Barabati Stadium in Cuttack. India won by 20 runs, giving Karthik his first man-of-the-match award. He was then selected for the series against Sri Lanka and the 2007 Cricket World Cup. Before their tour of England, India played a series of ODIs in Ireland against the hosts and South Africa. Karthik played in four matches, scoring 15 runs at 51.00 and keeping wicket in two matches.

Selected for the inaugural 2007 ICC World Twenty20 in South Africa in September 2007, he played in India's earlier matches before being replaced in the semi-final and final by Rohit Sharma. During the series against England, he played in only the final match in Mumbai, making a duck as India scraped home by two wickets.

=== Formative years (2009–2019) ===
Karthik had another chance in India's four-match tour of West Indies when he replaced Virender Sehwag, who was out with a shoulder problem. He scored 67, 4 and 47 runs as an opener as India took the series, 2–1. Karthik was retained for a short triangular ODI tournament in Sri Lanka in September. He scored 4 and 16 in India's two round-robin matches and was dropped for the final, in which India defeated the hosts. Karthik was retained for the 2009 ICC Champions Trophy in South Africa, but after his performances in Sri Lanka he was omitted for the first two matches. Although he had an opportunity in India's final pool match against the West Indies and scored 34 in a seven-wicket win, it was not enough to prevent India's first-round exit.

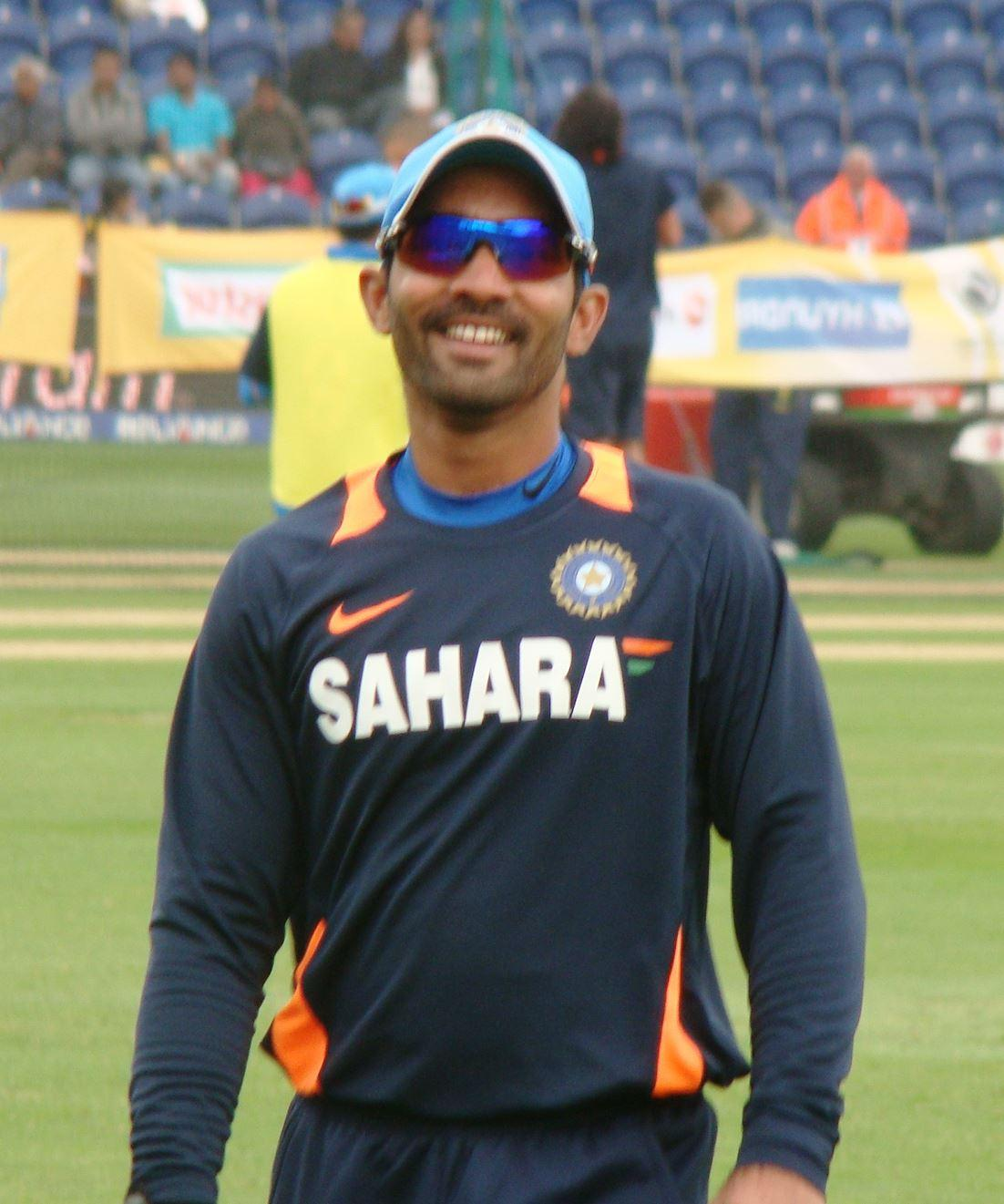
Karthik during the 2013 ICC Champions Trophy

In December 2009, Karthik was recalled to the ODI team during the Sri Lankan tour of India after Dhoni was banned after the second match for two matches because of low over rates. Karthik kept wickets in the next two matches, scoring 32 and 19 (unbeaten in both) and helping guide India to the target in successful run chases. He retained his place as a middle-order batsman in the fifth and final match when Dhoni returned after Tendulkar was rested and Yuvraj was injured, but the match was ended early due to an unsafe pitch.

Karthik retained his place for the ODI tri-series in Bangladesh against the hosts and Sri Lanka after Tendulkar was rested for the tournament. He was an opener with Gambhir in the last two of the round-robin matches, after Sehwag was rested. Although Karthik made 48 and 34 in quick time as India won both matches, he was dropped for the final (which India lost).

Karthik was recalled to the Indian ODI team for the 2013 ICC Champions Trophy after a good domestic season and IPL performance. He scored back-to-back centuries in the two warm-up games, securing his place on the team for the tournament.

On 10 December 2017 Karthik faced 18 deliveries without scoring a run against Sri Lanka, an ODI record. He was flown in for the third Test of India's 2017–18 tour of South Africa to replace the injured wicket-keeper, Saha. The substitute, Patel, was included on the team before he injured his right index finger; Karthik began keeping the wickets on day four of the Test. Although he was on the squad for the limited-overs matches, he did not make the playing eleven (except for the final T20I, when he made a six-ball 13). Karthik was again named to the squad for the March 2018 Nidahas Trophy Tri-Nation T20 series, after team regular (and wicket-keeper) Dhoni was rested. He played a match-winning knock of an unbeaten 29 off eight balls in the final of the tournament against Bangladesh. Coming to bat when India required 34 runs off the last two overs, Karthik's assault (which included a six when requiring five runs off the last ball) won the match and the tournament.

In April 2019, he was named to India's squad for the 2019 Cricket World Cup. On 6 July, in the match against Sri Lanka, Karthik played his 150th international match for India. He had a forgettable outing in the 2019 World Cup and, as a result, he was dropped from both the ODI and T20I squads post the quadrennial event.

=== Comeback and retirement (2022-2024) ===
In 2022, at age 37, Karthik was recalled to India's T20 set-up after three years, for the South African tour of India in May 2022. He outperformed expectations and stunned the world by scoring his maiden half-century in the format, 16 years after debut, in the third match of the series. In June, he was named in India's squad for their T20I series against Ireland. In July, Karthik was named captain of the Indian team for the 20-over warm-up matches against Derbyshire and Northamptonshire ahead of the T20I series against England. He was subsequently named in India's squad as the starting wicket-keeper for the T20 World Cup to be held later that year, marking a remarkable comeback for the then-37 year old keeper . However, Karthik failed to live up to expectations and had a poor outing with the bat, scoring only 14 runs in four innings, before being dropped for the rest of the tournament. This would be Karthik's last international appearances as he was later dropped from the national cricket team altogether afterwards.

== Domestic career ==
Karthik made his debut in late 2002 against Baroda as a wicket-keeper. He batted in five matches of the round-robin, scoring 179 runs at an average of 35.80 with a top score of 88 not out against Uttar Pradesh in his second match. Karthik's form tapered off after this match, and he failed to pass 20 again during the season. He took 11 catches but due to repeated wicket-keeping errors, he was dropped from the season's final matches.

Karthik was not considered for the zonal Duleep Trophy, and played in the under-19s for South Zone. He was more productive in his second zonal season, scoring 180 runs at 60.00 with three half-centuries. He was selected for the national under-19 team, and played in three youth One Day Internationals (ODIs) against Nepal.

Karthik attended a wicket-keeping camp in the off-season under, guided by former Indian keeper and chairman of selectors Kiran More, which he credited with improving his technique. After playing in the Chennai League, he returned to the under-22 team at the start of the season before his selection for India Emerging Players to play their youthful counterparts from Sri Lanka and Pakistan in late September.

Karthik was recalled to the Ranji Trophy team at the beginning of the 2003–04 season. He scored 438 runs (an average of 43.80), with two centuries, and took 20 catches. In the semi-final against Railways, he scored his maiden first-class century with 122 runs. He followed this with an unbeaten 109 in the final against Mumbai.

Karthik was selected for the India squad in the 2004 Under-19 Cricket World Cup in Bangladesh, and scored two half-centuries on an India A tour to Zimbabwe. He had a strong domestic first-class season in 2008–09. After starting the Ranji Trophy campaign with two single-figure scores, he scored 213 runs in partnership with Subramaniam Badrinath as Tamil Nadu defeated Uttar Pradesh by an innings. Karthik then scored 123 and 113 in consecutive matches against Baroda and Railways, before ending his Ranji Trophy campaign with 72 against Uttar Pradesh in the return match. He continued his strong run against Central Zone in the Duleep Trophy, scoring 153 (103 in one match). Karthik ended with 1,026 runs at 64.12 for the season, including five centuries and two fifties.

In 2009–2010, he was the Tamil Nadu captain in six Ranji Trophy matches. Karthik scored 152 against Orissa and 117 against Punjab, adding a further two scores of at least 70. He scored only 16 runs in his four other innings, ending the season with 443 runs and an average of 55.37.

Karthik was named captain of the India A team for the 2018–19 Deodhar Trophy in October 2018. In October 2019, he was named in India C squad for the next edition. Karthik led the Tamil Nadu team to their second Syed Mushtaq Ali Trophy win, at the tournament's 2020–21 edition, after he captained the team to a win at the inaugural edition in 2006–07. He finished with 183 runs at 61.00 and was named captain in Wisden's 'team of the tournament'.

Dinesh Karthik has become the 4th Indian batsman to play 300 T20 matches.

== Franchise career ==
=== Indian Premier League ===
Karthik played in the inaugural season of the Indian Premier League as wicket-keeper for the Delhi Daredevils, scoring 145 runs with the bat at 24.16 and a strike rate of 135.51. His highest score was an unbeaten 56 to steer Daredevils to a five-wicket win in a group match against the Mumbai Indians. In the 2009 edition hosted by South Africa, Karthik played in each of Daredevils' 15 matches. He scored 288 runs at 36.00, passing 40 on three occasions and making 17 dismissals. Although Daredevils topped the tournament's pool stage, Karthik made only nine in the semi-final and his team were defeated by six wickets by the Deccan Chargers.

Karthik was bought by Kings XI Punjab in 2011 for US$900,000, making him the second-most-expensive player on their squad. For the 2012 season, Karthik joined Mumbai Indians for a reported US$2.35 million. He played with Mumbai Indians for two seasons (2012, 2013), winning the title in 2013. Karthik was instrumental in his team's campaign; he scored 510 runs at 28.33. Karthik refused to be retained by Mumbai Indians ahead of the 2014 personnel changes, a move that later recalled as being a "regret". He was bought by Delhi Daredevils. In 2015, he moved to Royal Challengers Bangalore and in 2016, to Gujarat Lions, who retained him for the 2017 season. Karthik was named wicket-keeper of the IPL XI of the tournament for that season by CricBuzz. He was bought by the Kolkata Knight Riders for the 2018 season (replacing Gautam Gambhir), and led the team to the playoffs. For his performance in the 2018 IPL season, Karthik was named to the Cricinfo and CricBuzz IPL XI.

In 2020, halfway through the season Karthik relinquished the captaincy to Eoin Morgan. The team could, however, win only three off their seven matches in the second half and failed to qualify for the playoffs for the second season in a row. Karthik managed to score only 223 runs and enforce seven dismissals in 2021 edition. He ended his Kolkata Knight Riders stint as the second most successful captain of the franchise only behind Gautam Gambhir.

In the 2022 auctions, Karthik was bought by the Royal Challengers Bangalore for ₹5.50 crore. He managed to score 330 runs in 16 matches with an average of 55.00 and a strike rate of 183.33. He had a poor 2023 campaign with the bat, scoring only 140 runs with an average of just above 11. Ahead of the following edition, the media speculated that it was going to be his final season in the IPL. Karthik began the season strongly and scored two consecutive half-centuries, against Mumbai Indians and Sunrisers Hyderabad respectively. However, his team ended losing both matches. The latter innings was a 35-ball 83, in a chase of 288, which included five fours and seven sixes. Though RCB started poorly at the start of the season, going 1–6, the team made a comeback and later qualified for a playoff spot after beating the Chennai Super Kings. Throughout the season Karthik was commended for his reflexes behind the stumps and finishing abilities. However the fairy tale story could not continue as RCB would be defeated by the Rajasthan Royals in the postseason. Karthik would later announce his retirement from professional cricket in 2024.

Dinesh Karthik ended his IPL career with the record for the most ducks in IPL history, with 18 dismissals without scoring.

=== SA20 ===
In August 2024, Cricinfo reported Karthik would join Paarl Royals of the SA20 competition for 2025, thus becoming the first Indian to play in SA20. He made his league debut on 11 January 2025, as a wicket-keeper against Sunrisers Eastern Cape.

== Commentary career ==
Dinesh Karthik was part of the commentary team during India-England T20I and ODI series held in March 2021. He made his debut behind the mic for the official broadcasters of England and Wales Cricket Board. On 12 March 2021, Sky Sports announced that Karthik would be part of their commentary team for the inaugural season of the Hundred. Dinesh Karthik and former captain Sunil Gavaskar were also the only two Indians to be included in the ICC's on-ground commentary panel for the inaugural ICC World Test Championship final between India and New Zealand in Southampton. Dinesh Karthik was also part of the commentary team during England-Sri Lanka T20I and ODI series held in July 2021.

== Personal life ==
In 2007, Karthik married Nikita Vanjara, and the couple divorced in 2012. He got engaged to squash player, Dipika Pallikal, in November 2013, and got married in August 2015. The couple have twin boys born on 18 October 2021, and a daughter, born on 19 March 2026.
