= Mira Aggarwal =

Indian politician

Mayor of North Delhi
- In office 30 April 2012 – 8 April 2013

Chairperson, Appointments Committee (MCD)
- In office 1 April 2010 – 30 March 2012

Personal details
- Born: 15 May 1961 (age 65) Delhi, India
- Party: Bharatiya Janata Party (1990–present)
- Spouse: Dr. Anil Aggarwal
- Children: Vaibhav (Son); Sambhav (Son)
- Education: Govt. Girls Higher secondary School, Model Town Delhi; Hindu College, University of Delhi; Campus Law Centre, University of Delhi.
- Profession: Lawyer
- Website: Official website

Mira Aggarwal (born 15 May 1961) is an Indian politician of the Bharatiya Janata Party (BJP). She was the first Mayor of the North Delhi Municipal Corporation, which was abolished in 2022 after the merging of the three municipal corporations of Delhi. She was the first lady to be appointed to the post of Deputy Mayor of Delhi (MCD) in 1998. She is a third-time councillor, holds an LLB degree and has been elected from the Sawan Park ward.

== Early life ==
Mira Aggarwal was born in Delhi, India in a Hindu family. Her father, Lt. Shri. Lala Ram Bilas Gupta, was a freedom fighter, a prominent member of the Rashtriya Swayamsevak Sangh (RSS) since its inception and a well-known social worker of Delhi. She completed her early schooling from Govt. Girls Higher Secondary School, Model Town, and then enrolled at Hindu College of University of Delhi. She graduated in Law from Campus Law Centre, University of Delhi. She was an Advocate before the High Court of Delhi. Mira Aggarwal began her political career with Akhil Bharatiya Vidyarthi Parishad(ABVP) during her college days. As a student, she was very active in public speaking and other social activities.

== List of key posts and responsibilities held ==
1. 2013 – Vice President, BJP Delhi State
2. 2012 – present – Member of House (Councillor) from Sawan Park (Ward No. 66), North Delhi Municipal Corporation (NDMC)
3. 2012 – 2013 – Mayor, North Delhi Municipal Corporation (NDMC)
4. 2007 – 2012 – Member of House (Councillor) from Kohat Enclave (Ward No. 63), Municipal Corporation of Delhi (MCD)
5. 2007 – 2010 – Member Standing Committee, Municipal Corporation of Delhi (MCD)
6. 2010 – 2012 – Chairperson, Appointment, Promotion and Disciplinary Action Committee, Municipal Corporation of Delhi (MCD)
7. 1999 – Chairperson, Education Committee, Municipal Corporation of Delhi (MCD)
8. 1998 – Member Parliamentary Board, BJP Delhi State
9. 1998 – Deputy Mayor of Delhi, Municipal Corporation of Delhi (MCD)
10. 1997 – 2002 – Member of House (Councillor) from Model Town, Municipal Corporation of Delhi (MCD)
11. 1995 – 1997 – Member Disciplinary Committee, BJP Delhi
12. 1995 – Vice President, Mahilla Morcha, BJP Delhi
13. 1993 – General Secretary, Mahilla Morcha, BJP Delhi
14. 1993 – 2008 – Executive Member, BJP Delhi
15. 1983 – 1984 – Joint Secretary, Delhi University Students Union (DUSU) from Akhil Bhartiya Vidyarthee Parishad (ABVP)
16. 1978 – 1983 – State executive member, State Joint Secretary, State Girls Incharge, Akhil Bhartiya Vidyarthee Parishad (ABVP)
17. 1978 – Rashtriya Sevika Samiti (15 Day Camp), and started RSS shakha of girls in Model Town
