= Gambhir =

Gambhir is an Indian surname of Hindu and Sikh Punjabis of the Arora community.

People bearing the surname Gambhir include:

- Daljeet Singh Gambhir, Indian cardiologist
- Eenam Gambhir (born 1983), Indian diplomat
- Gautam Gambhir (born 1981), Indian cricketer
- Gaurav Gambhir (born 1987), Indian cricketer
- Jasvinder K. Gambhir, Indian doctor, medical researcher and professor
- Sanjiv Sam Gambhir (1962–2020), Indian-American physician and scientist
- Surendra Gambhir, Indian-American writer, academic and professor
