= M. V. Muralidaran =

Indian judge (born 1962)

Hon'ble Justice (Retd.) M. V. Muralidaran

Judge of Calcutta High Court
- In office 2 November 2023 – 15 April 2024
- Nominated by: D. Y. Chandrachud
- Appointed by: Droupadi Murmu

Judge of Manipur High Court
- In office 18 March 2019 – 1 November 2023
- Nominated by: Ranjan Gogoi
- Appointed by: Ram Nath Kovind
- Acting Chief Justice
- In office 6 February 2023 – 19 October 2023
- Appointed by: Droupadi Murmu
- Preceded by: P. V. Sanjay Kumar
- Succeeded by: Siddharth Mridul

Judge of Madras High Court
- In office 7 April 2016 – 17 March 2019
- Nominated by: T. S. Thakur
- Appointed by: Pranab Mukherjee

Personal details
- Born: 16 April 1962 (age 64) Vellore
- Parent: K. Vajjiravelu
- Education: M.A. and LL.B

Maniampattu Vajjiravelu Muralidaran (born 16 April 1962) is a retired Indian judge. He had served as a Judge of Calcutta High Court, Manipur High Court and Madras High Court.

== Early life ==
He was born on 16 April 1962 to late K. Vajjiravelu at Vellore, Tamil Nadu. His family belongs to agricultural background and he did M.A. and LL.B. He was enrolled as advocate on 12 September 1990 and started practising before the High Court of Madras and Madurai Bench, DRT and DRAT, City Civil Court, Sessions Courts, Magistrate Courts and other Subordinate Courts.

== Career ==
He was appointed as judge of Madras High Court on 7 April 2016 and was transferred to Manipur High Court on 18 March 2019. He also served as Acting Chief Justice of Manipur High Court consequent upon the elevation of the then Chief Justice P. V. Sanjay Kumar to Supreme Court of India

During his tenure as Acting Chief Justice, on 23 March 2023, he ordered the Manipur government to consider the case of the Meitei community in the Scheduled Tribe list, expeditiously, and preferably within a period of four weeks. This Order resulted in unrest in the state which is still ongoing. He also admitted a public interest litigation seeking to quash a report produced by the Editors Guild of India on the Manipur violence this decision irked the then CJI D. Y. Chandrachud who remarked that high court should have better things to do.

Following this he was transferred to Calcutta High Court, though he requested collegium either to transfer him back to his parent high court i.e. Madras High Court or allow him to function at Manipur High Court but collegium turned down his request.

He took oath as judge of Calcutta High Court on 2 November 2023 while Siddharth Mridul was appointed as new permanent chief justice of Manipur High Court.

He retired from Calcutta High Court on 15 April 2024.
