= Rajesh Talwar =

Indian lawyer and author

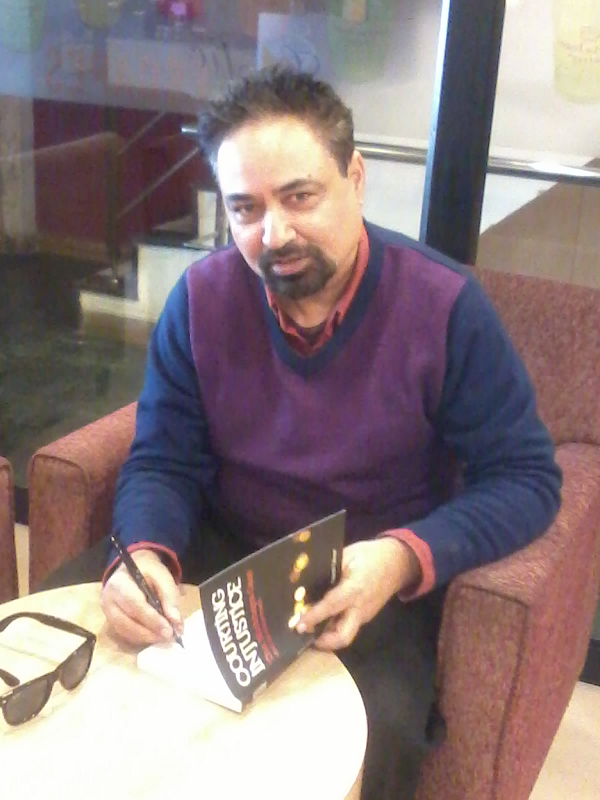
- Education: Hindu College, Delhi; Faculty of Law, Delhi; Delhi University; University of Nottingham
- Occupations: Writer, lawyer

Rajesh Talwar is an Indian lawyer and author. He has written several books on the topics of law and human rights and also some children's books and plays.

== Early life ==
Talwar finished his schooling from La Martiniere College, Lucknow and thereafter studied for a BA (Hons) in Economics at Hindu College, Delhi at the University of Delhi. Subsequently, after securing an LL.B from Faculty of Law, University of Delhi, he studied for an LL.M in human rights law at the University of Nottingham, England, funded by a British Chevening Scholarship.

== Career ==
Talwar is both a practitioner and teacher of law. He taught LL.B students at both Delhi University and Jamia Millia Islamia over a period of six years. Thereafter, he began working for the United Nations in various capacities including as the Executive Officer of the UN Human Rights Advisory Panel in Kosovo, as the Legal Adviser to the Police Commissioner in East Timor and as the Deputy Legal Adviser to the United Nations Assistance Mission in Afghanistan. His work with the U.N. took him across the world including Somalia, Liberia, Kosovo and Afghanistan.

Talwar's career in writing includes Courting Injustice: The Nirbhaya Case and Its Aftermath, How to Choose a Lawyer – and Win Your Case. and Making Your Own Will. His most recent non-fiction work, The Mahatma's Manifesto: A Critique of Hind Swaraj, offers a critical analysis of Mahatma Gandhi's philosophical and political ideas as articulated in his seminal 1909 treatise, Hind Swaraj.

Talwar has been interviewed for his views on the Indian justice system by The New York Times He has written for various publications including the Harvard Independent, The Indian Express, The Times of India, Scroll, CNN-News 18, The New Indian Express, and The Daily Guardian.

Talwar's work for children include fiction and plays for children including The Boy Who Became a Mahatma on Mahatma Gandhi, The Boy Who Fought an Empire on Subhash Chandra Bose and a play titled The Boy Who Wrote a Constitution based on the childhood of B. R. Ambedkar, the chief architect of the Indian Constitution. His other children's books include The Three Greens, which has three children solving what are called 'enviromysteries'. (Orient BlackSwan).

In 2025, Talwar became the recipient of an Alumni Award from his Alma Mater, the University of Nottingham. According to the jury, he has had a global impact, contributing to human rights and sustainability through policy change and education, such as writing a play on toxic terror and a book on caste discrimination.

In February 2026, Talwar received the India-UK Achievers Award at the House of Lords in the British Parliament for his work as an author and his two-decade career with the United Nations. The award committee highlighted his writing across multiple genres and his legal studies, which include academic programs at the University of Delhi, the University of Nottingham, the University of Oxford, the University of Cambridge, and Harvard University.

For his work, amongst others, he has been interviewed by Sahitya Tak from the India Today Group and by Anand Bazaar Patrika ABP (Live) and has been a moderator and speaker at the Kalinga Literary Festival, the Pune International Literary Festival and the Pragati EVichaar Literary Festival amongst others.
