= P. V. Sanjay Kumar =

Judge of the Supreme Court of India

Hon'ble Justice P. V. Sanjay Kumar
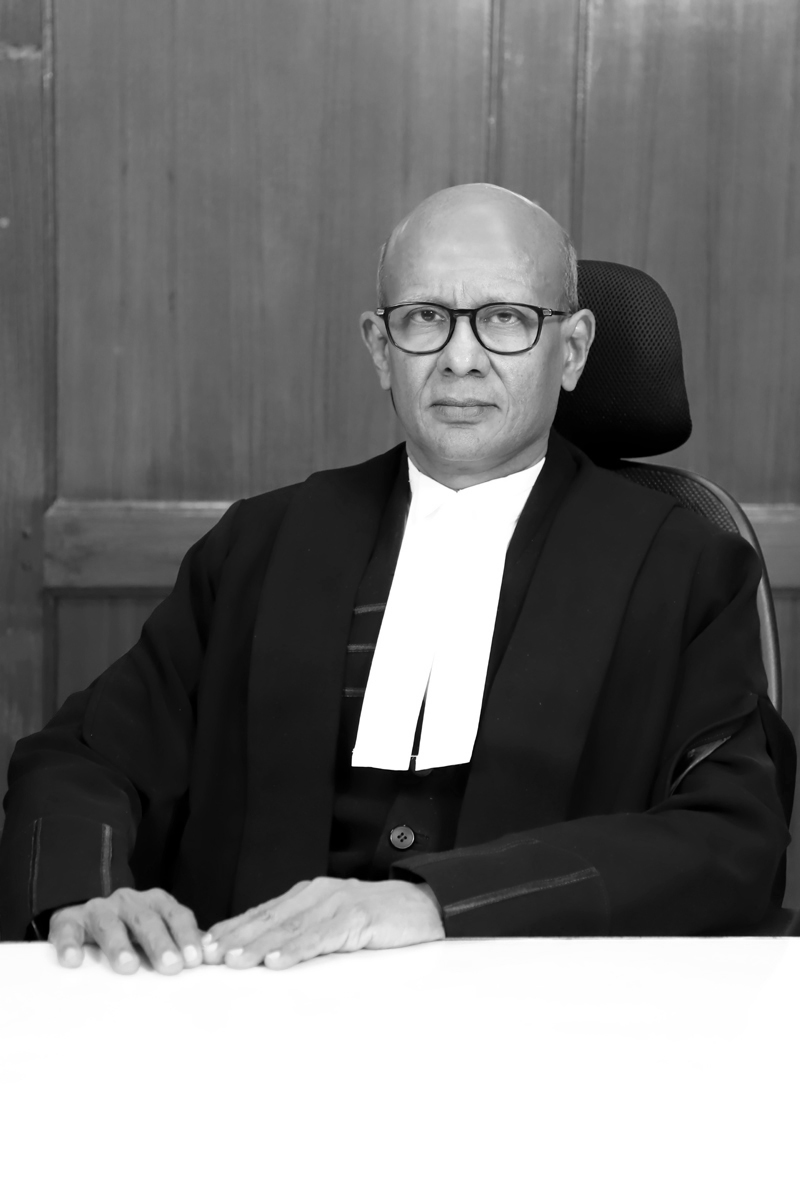

Judge of Supreme Court of India
- Incumbent
- Assumed office 6 February 2023
- Nominated by: D. Y. Chandrachud
- Appointed by: Droupadi Murmu

6th Chief Justice of Manipur High Court
- In office 14 February 2021 – 5 February 2023
- Nominated by: S. A. Bobde
- Appointed by: Ram Nath Kovind
- Preceded by: R. Sudhakar
- Succeeded by: Siddharth Mridul; M. V. Muralidaran (Acting)

Judge of Punjab & Haryana High Court
- In office 14 October 2019 – 13 February 2021
- Nominated by: Ranjan Gogoi
- Appointed by: Ram Nath Kovind

Judge of Telangana High Court
- In office 8 August 2008 – 13 October 2019
- Nominated by: K. G. Balakrishnan
- Appointed by: Pratibha Patil

Personal details
- Born: 14 August 1963 (age 63) Hyderabad
- Education: Nizam College; Faculty of Law, University of Delhi

Puligoru Venkata Sanjay Kumar (born 14 August 1963) is an Indian jurist who is serving as a judge of the Supreme Court of India. He is a former chief justice of the Manipur High Court. He has also served as a judge of the Punjab and Haryana High Court and Telangana High Court.

== Early life ==
P.V. Kumar was born on 14 August 1963, in Hyderabad to late P. Ramachandra Reddy and P. Padmavathamma. P.Ramachandra Reddy was the former Advocate General of Andhra Pradesh High Court (1969 to 1982). Kumar completed his graduation in Commerce from Nizam College, Hyderabad, and Law Degree from Delhi University in 1988 and enrolled in the Bar Council of Andhra Pradesh in August 1988.

== Career ==
He practiced at Andhra Pradesh High Court. He has served as the government pleader in the Andhra Pradesh High Court from 2000 to 2003. He was elevated as an additional judge of Telangana High Court on 8 August 2008 and made permanent judge on 20 January 2010. He was transferred as a judge of Punjab and Haryana High Court on 14 October 2019.

He was elevated as Chief Justice of Manipur High Court on 12 February 2021 and took the oath on 14 February 2021.

He was nominated to the Supreme Court by then Chief Justice of India D.Y. Chandrachud in December 2022 and appointed as judge on 6 February 2023.
