= Rakesh Ranjan Prasad =

Indian judge (1955-2018)

Hon'ble Chief Justice (Retd.) Rakesh Ranjan Prasad
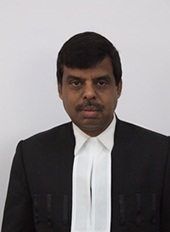

3rd Chief Justice of Manipur High Court
- In office 22 September 2016 – 30 June 2017
- Nominated by: T. S. Thakur
- Appointed by: Pranab Mukherjee
- Preceded by: Laxmi Kanta Mohapatra
- Succeeded by: Abhilasha Kumari; N. Kotiswar Singh (acting)

Judge of Manipur High Court
- In office 15 February 2016 – 21 September 2016; Acting CJ : 10 June 2016 - 21 September 2016
- Nominated by: T. S. Thakur
- Appointed by: Pranab Mukherjee

Judge of Jharkhand High Court
- In office 27 February 2006 – 14 February 2016
- Nominated by: Y. K. Sabharwal
- Appointed by: A. P. J. Abdul Kalam

Personal details
- Born: 1 July 1955 Bihar, India
- Died: 3 June 2018 (aged 62)
- Education: B.Sc and L. L. B.
- Alma mater: Patna Law College

Rakesh Ranjan Prasad (1 July 1955 — 3 June 2018) was an Indian judge who served as Chief Justice of Manipur High Court and judge of the Jharkhand High Court.

== Career ==
Prasad was born in 1955 in Bihar. He graduated in Science and passed LL.B. from Patna Law College. Prasad was enrolled as an Advocate in Bihar State Bar Council in 1980 and started practice in Civil, Criminal and Constitutional matters at the Patna High Court. On 6 May 1991 he joined Superior Judicial Service and was appointed Additional District Judge. He was promoted to District and Sessions Judge in 2001.

Prasad became Registrar General of Jharkhand High Court on 9 June 2001. On 27 February 2006 he was appointed a Judge of Jharkhand High Court thereafter transferred to Manipur High Court on 1 February 2016. Justice Prasad also took charge of the Acting Chief Justice of Manipur High Court after Justice Laxmi Kanta Mohapatra. On 22 September 2016 he became the permanent Chief Justice of the Manipur High Court. Prasad retired on 30 June 2017 from the judgeship.
