= Pinky Anand =

Indian lawyer and politician

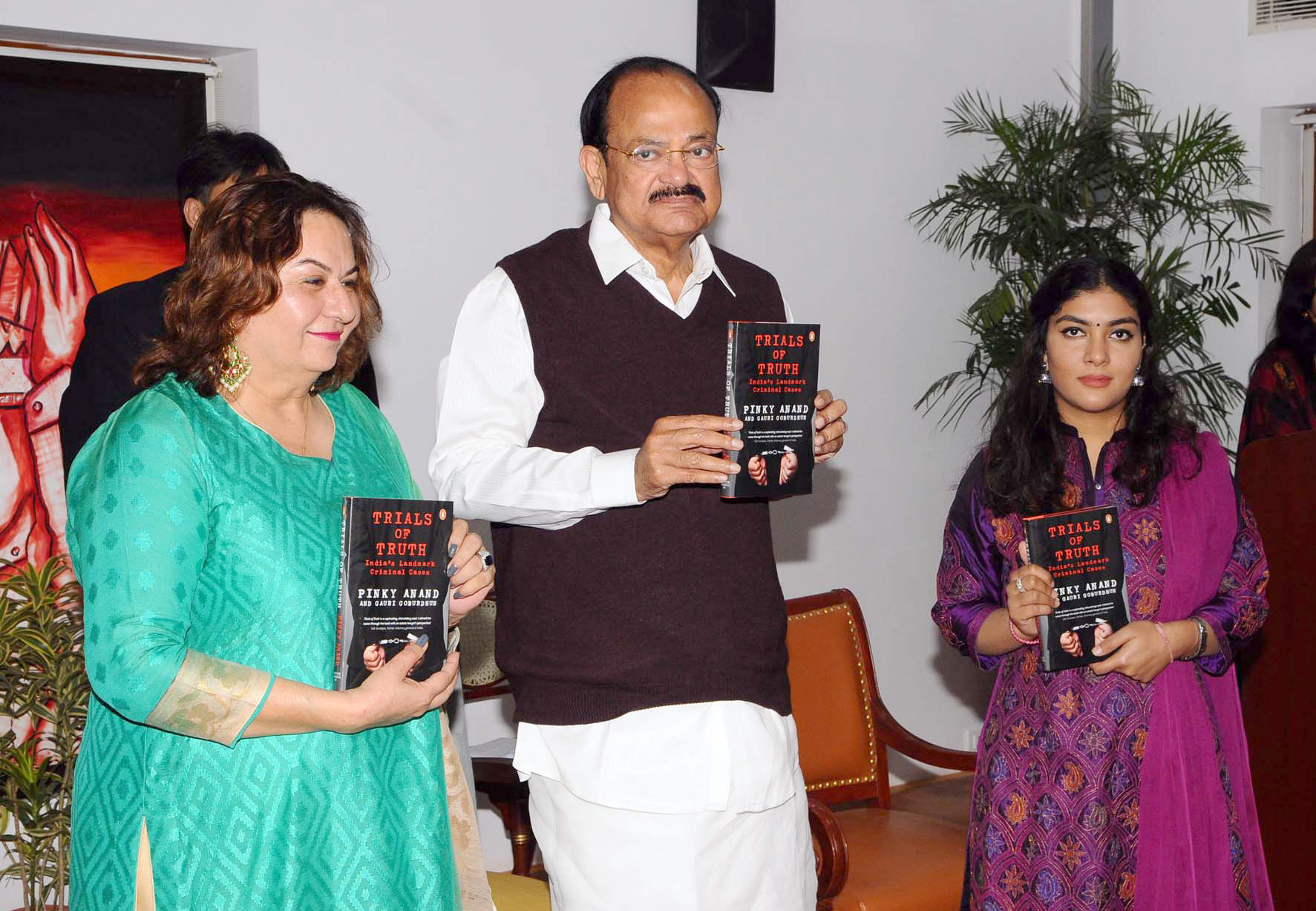
Anand (left) and Gauri Goburdhun (right) meeting Vice President Venkaiah Naidu to promote a book release.

Ravinder "Pinky" Singh Anand is an Indian lawyer and politician. She has served as an Additional Solicitor General at the Supreme Court of India.

== Education ==
Anand graduated from Lady Shri Ram College for Women and received her LLB degree from the Faculty of Law, University of Delhi. Between 1979–1980, she was elected the first woman secretary of the Delhi University Students Union (DUSU). Supported by a scholarship from the Inlaks Shivdasani Foundation, she studied at Harvard University to receive her Master of Laws in 1980.

== Career ==
Anand has worked in constitutional, property, private international, family, environmental and corporate law. She was the head of the All-India Legal Cell at the Bharatiya Janata Party (BJP) and is a former Additional Advocate-General for the state of Uttarakhand. In 2007, she was designated as a senior advocate. On July 9, 2014, she was appointed as an Additional Solicitor General of India. She is the second female lawyer to be appointed to this position, following Indira Jaising. Anand practices in the Supreme Court of India. She has worked for the Indian actress Khushbu, including twenty-one cases of defamation. She has also represented the Government of France in the case of the French aircraft carrier Clemenceau against genetically modified food in India.

=== Political career ===
Anand was a member of All India National Executive of BJP and served as the National Convenor of BJP's legal and legislative cell from 2007 to 2010. She represented BJP in the 5th General Assembly of International Conference of Asian Political Parties (ICAPP) at Astana, Kazakhstan-24–26 September 2009 and was elected the Vice President of the session on Women and Politics. She was a Member of the Delegation of the BJP to Kochi in July 2010.

== Other positions ==
Anand was the spokesperson for and led the All India Legal team of Bharatiya Janata Party (BJP). She is Alternate Country Councillor (India) of LAWASIA. She is Chairperson, National Committee Law, ASSOCHAM Ladies League. She has received several awards for excellence in law by FICCI, Lions Club, Amity University & Bharat Nirman, PHD Chamber for Progress Harmony Development. She was a Core Committee member of the National Human Rights Commission. She is a director at the Research Foundation for Science, Technology and Ecology, an NGO in the field of environment. She is a member in the Board of Studies at the School of Law in KIIT University.

Anand was a Fellow of Session 433, "Women, Political Power & Next Generation Leadership" Salzburg Seminar in Austria, 2006.

As of 2015, Anand represented India in the formation of BRICS Legal Forum and was a member of the Indian delegation to Brazil. She represented India at II BRICS Legal Forum at Shanghai in October 2015. She was a speaker at the Ladies Study Group, Kolkata at the Seminar on "Law and the Woman" in November 2015. She was also a Panel Speaker at Jaipur Literature Festival 2016.

== Awards ==
- French National Order of Merit from the President of the French Republic
- Award for Excellence in Law 2009, by FICCI FLO for outstanding contribution in the field of law.
- 19th Bharat Nirman Awards for Excellence in Law in 2007.

== Publications ==
- Co-author of International Family Law, Jurisdictional Comparisons First Edition 2011, printed by Sweet & Maxwell, UK.
