= M. Aranganathan =

Indian writer (1931–2017)

- Born: M. Aranganathan; 3 November 1932; Thiruppathisaram, Kanyakumari district
- Died: 16 April 2017 (aged 84); Chennai, Tamilnadu
- Occupation: Writer
- Children: R. Mahadevan (son) Parvathy Aka Selvi (Daughter)
- Awards: Artist Award (Kalaingar Award), Tamil Nadu Government Award, Tirupur Tamil Sangh Award

M. Aranganathan (November 3, 1931 – April 16, 2017) was an Indian writer. He wrote 90 short stories, two novels and 47 articles, and ran the literary magazine Munril from 1988 to 1996.

== Biography ==
He was born in Thiruppathisaram (Thiruvanparisaram) village of Kanyakumari district. parents are Mahadevan and Parvathiyammal. Later migrated to Chennai due to work. Deeply involved in Sangam literature, Shaiva Siddhanta, Western literature and films, he started writing for Prasanda Vikatan magazine in 1950. He also ran a literary magazine called Munril, which was published in 19 issues from 1988 to 1996 and is one of the best in the history of Tamil magazines. Many of his works are taught in various universities of Tamil Nadu. His 86 short stories have been translated into English by Shanti Sivaraman. And all his works have been published in the year 2016 under the name of "'Mr. Aranganathan's works'".

A resident of Chennai for over 50 years, he retired as a clerk in the Chennai Corporation, retired from government service and later resided in Puducherry. He was buried there (Pondicherry) after his death.

== Literary works ==
- Subject Matter Poem (Essay Collections)
- Vedu Peru (Collection of Short Stories)
- Kadan Hill (Collection of Short Stories)
- Sirapalli (Collection of Short Stories)
- A word of wisdom (Collection of Short Stories)
- M. Aranganathan's stories
- M. Aranganathan's Essay
- Paraliyartu Mandar (New)
- Kaliyutu (New)
- Literary magazine

He has written a total of 90 short stories, two novels and 47 articles. He has also been awarded Tamil Nadu Government Writer Award, Artist Award of Papacy Society, Lily Devasakayamani Literary Award and Tirupur Tamil Sangha Award etc.

== M. Aranganathan Literary Award ==
His son, R. Mahadevan, is serving as a judge of the Chennai High Court. Through his father he also has a great interest in Tamil literature. Also, in memory of father Arangam Mahadevan is presenting Aranganathan literary award to Tamil Scholars. 16 April every year from 2018.

These awards are given to the best writers of Tamil who have been contributing for many years in the field of literature considering their overall literary contribution and activities in two categories such as poetry, short story, novel and essay in one category and drama, translation, research books, poetry, criticism and young writers in another category. The awardees were presented with a cash prize of one lakh each. A sculpture of Aranganathan is also being presented as a souvenir.

Professor K. Panchangam and writer Suresh Kumar Indrajith have received the Literary Award for the year 2013.
