= Manipur High Court =

High Court for the State of Manipur

- Established: 25 March 2013; 13 years ago
- Jurisdiction: Manipur
- Location: Imphal, Manipur
- Composition method: Presidential with confirmation of Chief Justice of India and Governor of respective state.
- Authorised by: Constitution of India
- Appeals to: Supreme Court of India
- Judge term length: Mandatory Retirement by age of 62
- Number of positions: 4
- Website: hcmimphal.nic.in

Chief Justice
- Currently: M. Sundar
- Since: 15 September 2025

The Manipur High Court is the High Court of the state of Manipur, India. It was established on 25 March 2013, after making suitable amendments in the Constitution of India and North-Eastern Areas (Reorganisation) Act, 1971. The seat of the High Court is at Imphal, the capital of Manipur. The first Chief Justice is Justice Abhay Manohar Sapre. Earlier, a bench of the Gauhati High Court used to have jurisdiction over the state of Manipur.

== Chief Justice and Judges ==
Manipur High Court is permitted to have a maximum of 5 judges of which 4 may be permanently appointed and 1 may be additionally appointed. Currently, it has 3 judges.

== Former Chief Justices ==
#	Chief Justice	Parent high court	Assumed office	Left office	Term length	Appointer
1	Justice Abhay Manohar Sapre	Madhya Pradesh High Court	23 March 2013	19 October 2013	210 days	Pranab Mukherjee
–	Justice Laxmi Kanta Mohapatra (acting)	Orissa High Court	21 October 2013	9 July 2014	261 days	Pranab Mukherjee
2	Justice Laxmi Kanta Mohapatra	Orissa High Court	10 July 2014	10 July 2015	1 year, 0 days	Pranab Mukherjee
–	Justice Rakesh Ranjan Prasad (acting)	Jharkhand High Court	11 July 2015	1 September 2016	1 year, 52 days	Pranab Mukherjee
3	Justice Rakesh Ranjan Prasad	Jharkhand High Court	2 September 2016	30 June 2017	301 days	Pranab Mukherjee
–	Justice N. Kotiswar Singh (acting)	Manipur High Court	1 July 2017	8 February 2018	222 days	Pranab Mukherjee
4	Justice Abhilasha Kumari	Himachal Pradesh High Court	9 February 2018	22 February 2018	13 days	Ram Nath Kovind
–	Justice N. Kotiswar Singh (acting)	Manipur High Court	23 February 2018	17 May 2018	83 days	Ram Nath Kovind
5	Justice Ramalingam Sudhakar	Madras High Court	18 May 2018	13 February 2021	2 years, 271 days	Ram Nath Kovind
6	Justice P. V. Sanjay Kumar	Andhra Pradesh High Court	14 February 2021	5 February 2023	1 year, 356 days	Ram Nath Kovind
–	Justice M. V. Muralidaran (acting)	Madras High Court	6 February 2023	19 October 2023	255 days	Droupadi Murmu
7	Justice Siddharth Mridul	Delhi High Court	20 October 2023	21 November 2024	1 year, 32 days	Droupadi Murmu
8	Justice D. Krishnakumar	Madras High Court	22 November 2024	21 May 2025	180 days	Droupadi Murmu
9	Justice Kempaiah Somashekar	Karnataka High Court	22 May 2025	14 September 2025	115 days	Droupadi Murmu
10	Justice M. Sundar	Madras High Court	15 September 2025	Incumbent	310 days	Droupadi Murmu

== Judges elevated as Chief Justices ==
This sections contains list of only those judges elevated as chief justices whose parent high court is Manipur. This includes those judges who, at the time of appointment as chief justice, may not be serving in Manipur High Court but this list does not include judges who at the time of appointment as chief justice were serving in Manipur High Court but does not have Manipur as their Parent High Court.

Colour Key

- Female Chief Justice
- Served as Chief Justice of India

Symbol Key

- ^{‡} Elevated to Supreme Court of India
- ^{RES} Resigned
- ^{†} Died in office

Name	Image	Appointed as CJ in HC of	Date of appointment		Date of retirement (Note: this includes date of resignation, death and elevation to supreme court)	Tenure	
Name	Image	Appointed as CJ in HC of	As Judge	As Chief Justice	Date of retirement	As Chief Justice	As Judge (Note: also includes tenure as Chief Justice)
Nongmeikapam Kotiswar Singh		Jammu & Kashmir and Ladakh	17 October 2011	15 February 2023	18 July 2024^{[‡]}	1 year, 154 days	12 years, 275 days

== Judges elevated to Supreme Court ==
This section includes the list of only those judges whose parent high court was Manipur. This includes those judges who, at the time of elevation to Supreme Court of India, may not be serving in Manipur High Court but this list does not include judges who at the time of elevation were serving in Manipur High Court but does not have Manipur as their Parent High Court.

Colour Key

- Female Judge
- Served as Chief Justice of India

Symbol Key

- ^{RES} Resigned
- ^{†} Died in office

#	Name of the Judge	Image	Date of Appointment		Date of Retirement	Tenure			Immediately preceding office
#	Name of the Judge	Image	In Parent High Court	In Supreme Court	Date of Retirement	In High Court(s)	In Supreme Court	Total tenure (Note: Includes both tenure as High Court Judge as well as Supreme Court Judge)	Immediately preceding office
1	Nongmeikapam Kotiswar Singh		17 October 2011	18 July 2024	Incumbent	12 years, 275 days	2 years, 155 days	14 years, 279 days	36th CJ of Jammu & Kashmir and Ladakh HC
