= Aruna Suresh =

Indian judge

Hon'ble Ms. Justice (Retd.) Aruna Suresh

Judge of the Orissa High Court
- In office 28 October 2010 – 17 February 2012
- Nominated by: S. H. Kapadia
- Appointed by: Pratibha Patil

Judge of the Delhi High Court
- In office 4 July 2006 – 27 October 2010
- Nominated by: Yogesh Kumar Sabharwal
- Appointed by: A.P.J. Abdul Kalam

Personal details
- Born: 19 February 1950 (age 76)
- Education: University of Delhi

Aruna Suresh (born 19 February 1950) is a former judge of the Orissa High Court in India. She also served on the Delhi High Court. She gained public attention after an association of lawyers boycotted her courtroom in Odisha, following her request to a senior counsel to refrain from intervening in a case where he was not representing any of the parties involved.

== Career ==
Suresh qualified into the Delhi Judicial Service in 1973, and initially served in the lower judiciary in Delhi in several capacities, including subordinate civil judge, metropolitan magistrate, insolvency judge, judge of the small causes court, and rent controller. Between 1987 and 1991, she was also the secretary for legal aid services in the district courts in Delhi.

In 1991, Suresh joined the Delhi Higher Judicial Service. She worked as a district and sessions judge, and also served as a special judge for cases prosecuted under the Narcotic Drugs and Psychotropic Substances Act, for cases investigated by the Central Bureau of Investigation, and a sessions judge in the Mahila Adalat (Women's Court). In addition to hearing criminal cases, Suresh worked as an additional district judge, hearing civil cases. In 2006, she was appointed the chief district and sessions judge for Delhi.

=== Delhi High Court ===
Suresh was appointed to the Delhi High Court on 4 July 2006 as an additional judge, and was confirmed as a permanent judge on 11 February 2008. In 2009, Suresh, along with another judge, Pradeep Nandrajog, acquitted an army officer who had been accused of murdering a businessman by mailing him a parcel bomb in 1982. They held that the evidence against the 71 year old officer was "weak" and released him after 27 years of imprisonment. The case was widely reported.

In 2010, Suresh was one of the judges who heard a case between the University of Delhi and their teachers' union, which had refused to teach classes after the university switched from an annual examination system to a system of examinations conducted every semester. The case was filed by the Delhi University Teachers' Union, and ultimately decided in favour of the University, allowing the semester system to be implemented.

=== Odisha High Court ===
Suresh was transferred from the Delhi High Court to the Odisha High Court, taking up her appointment on 28 October 2010. The move was ordered by President Pratibha Patil, who transferred 11 judges on recommendations from the Supreme Court .

In December 2010, Suresh asked a senior advocate in the High Court to take his seat, after he intervened in a case that he was not involved in, to argue a point for a counsel in that matter. In response to her request, the Odisha High Court Bar Association boycotted her court, with the secretary of the association describing the request as "hurtful". Suresh went on leave following the boycott.

She retired on 17 February 2012. She is currently on the panel of arbitrators listed with the Indian Council of Arbitration.

== Personal life ==
Suresh was educated in Delhi, graduating from Inderprastha College, University of Delhi in 1969. She studied law at the Faculty of Law, University of Delhi.
