= Kadambari Murali =

Kadambari Murali Wade
- Born: 9 August 1975 (age 50); Mumbai, India
- Status: Married
- Occupations: Magazine editor, sports journalist
- Notable credit(s): National sports editor, HindustanTimes, Asian Age; The Pioneer
- Title: Former editor-in-chief, Sports Illustrated
- Spouse: Wyly Wade

Kadambari Murali Wade (born 9 August 1975) the former sports journalist and former editor-in-chief of Sports Illustrated India, is the only woman to have held that post at the Hindustan Times. She joined SI India in November 2010, to direct the revamp of the monthly magazine beginning with its January 2011 issue. Her articles largely focus on cricket. She is the youngest national editor of a major news outlet. The first ever winner of the Sports Journalists Federation of India's Cricket Writer of the Year award in 2006, in August 2007, She also broke the story of the formation of the Indian cricket board's (BCCI) plans to create what would later be called the Indian Premier League (IPL) for cricket.

== Life and early career ==
Wade was born in Bombay (now Mumbai) in August 1975, but settled with her family in New Delhi. She studied at Carmel Convent in Delhi's Diplomatic Enclave before studying at Hindu College, University of Delhi for a BA (Hons) degree in political science.

She worked briefly with the Asian Age in 1996, before moving to The Pioneer, where she covered the environment, gender and development beats, reporting on Earth Summit II from the United Nations in New York in 1997.

From mid-1996 to 1998, she wrote one of India's first weekly web columns in a mainline daily, called "Surfer's Diary".

== Sports journalism ==
Wade also wrote occasionally for the sports section, but became a full-time sports journalist only when she moved first to the Asian Age (mid-1998-1999) and then The Indian Express (1999 to early 2001). In April 2001, she moved to the Hindustan Times to set up the Sunday team's section on sport.

Subsequently, as part of the HT sports desk, she was an investigative sports reporter, and then as a writer, while covering cricket in eight countries.

For forty-five days in Karachi, Lahore, Multan, Rawalpindi-Islamabad and Peshawar during India's tour of Pakistan in 2004 saw her become a contributing author to a book on that tour. Her writing from this tour is also part of the course-work for Delhi University's first-year 'Fluency in English' curriculum.

== Additional writing ==
Murali started writing a blog for The Moppet Show about the life and times of her daughter with special needs for The Mint, a collaboration between Hindustan Times and The Wall Street Journal.

== Recognition and awards ==
In 2005, at 29, Wade became one of the youngest sports editors in the country, when she took over as the sports editor of the Hindustan Times' Delhi edition. Two years later, she became the first woman to head sports in the paper's 85-year history, when she took charge as National Sports Editor, leading a team of over 40 full-time staffers and overseeing sports content for the print and web editions. She is largely considered to be the first woman to ever to be a national editor of sports in any major media.

She was the first recipient of the Sports Journalism Federation of India's Cricket Writer of the Year award at the national sports awards in 2005, and also received awards for News Story of the Year in 2005 and 2006, both for cricket-related reportage. The team she led won over 10 awards for sports writing and content at various events in a three-year span.

Wade has spoken on cricket on several panels, moderated the sports event at the Hindustan Times Leadership Summit (2009), been featured in news media in India, Pakistan, South Africa, the United States, Canada, England and Australia (both for her views on sport and for achievements in sports journalism) and is currently also working on two projects—a second book on cricket and a work of fiction.

She was part of the Consultative Committee on Women and the Games ahead of the 2010 Commonwealth Games in Delhi, is a current member of the Federation of Indian Chambers of Commerce and Industry (FICCI) Sports Committee and is one of a group of women chosen by national broadcaster Doordarshan to issue public service messages to encourage Indian women in their careers.
