= M. Sundar =

10th Chief Justice of Manipur High Court

The Honourable Chief Justice M. Sundar

10th Chief Justice of Manipur High Court
- Incumbent
- Assumed office 15 September 2025
- Nominated by: B. R. Gavai
- Appointed by: Droupadi Murmu
- Preceded by: K. Somashekar

Judge of Madras High Court
- In office 5 October 2016 – 14 September 2025
- Nominated by: T. S. Thakur
- Appointed by: Pranab Mukherjee

Personal details
- Born: 19 July 1966 (age 60) Chennai, Tamil Nadu, India
- Education: Madras Law College

M. Sundar (born 19 July 1966) is an Indian judge who is currently serving as the Chief Justice of Manipur High Court. He has previously served as a judge of the Madras High Court.

== Early life and career ==
Sundar was born on 19 July 1966 in Chennai. He did his graduation in law from Madras Law College and he belonged to the first batch of 5 years integrated Law Course. He was enrolled as an advocate in 1989.

He practiced as an advocate primarily in the Madras High Court mostly on the matters of civil side.

He was appointed as Judge of Madras High Court on 5 October 2016 and has been serving there since. He is also serving as executive chairman of Madras State Legal Services Authority since 2025. On 11 September 2025 Supreme Court Collegium led by CJI B. R. Gavai recommended him to be appointed as Chief Justice of Manipur High Court and government cleared his appointment on shortly and he took oath as Chief Justice of Manipur High Court on 15 September 2025.
