= K. Somashekar =

(9th Chief Justice of Manipur High Court (2025)

Hon’ble Chief Justice (Retd.) Kempaiah Somashekar
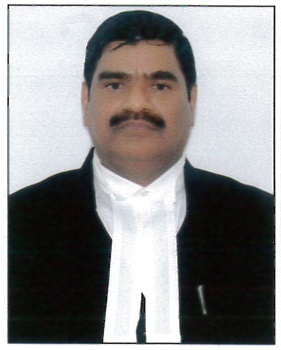

9th Chief Justice of Manipur High Court
- In office 22 May 2025 – 14 September 2025
- Nominated by: B. R. Gavai
- Appointed by: Droupadi Murmu
- Preceded by: D. Krishnakumar
- Succeeded by: M. Sundar

Judge of Karnataka High Court
- In office 14 November 2016 – 21 May 2025
- Nominated by: T. S. Thakur
- Appointed by: Pranab Mukherjee

Personal details
- Born: 15 September 1963 (age 62)

Kempaiah Somashekar (born 15 September 1963) is a retired Indian judge who has previously served as the 9th Chief Justice of Manipur High Court. He has also served as a judge of Karnataka High Court.

== Early life and education ==
Justice Somashekar was born on 15 September 1963. He enrolled as an advocate on 27 January 1990 and started practising law in Mysore and Chamarajanagar Districts on both Civil and Criminal sides.

== Career ==
He was directly appointed as District and Sessions Judge on 17 June 1998 and served as Additional Districts and Sessions Judge at Bijapur (Vijayapura) and City Civil Court, Bangalore. He also served as Principal District and Sessions Judge at Uttara Kannada, Karwar District; Hassan; Bangalore Rural District, Chitradurga. He then served as Principal City Civil and Sessions Judge, Bangalore and also served as Registrar Judicial and Registrar Vigilance at High Court of Karnataka.

He was elevated to bench as an additional judge of Karnataka High Court on 14 November 2016 and was confirmed as permanent Judge on 3 November 2018.

On 15 May 2025, Supreme court collegium led by Chief Justice of India Bhushan Ramkrishna Gavai recommended his elevation as Chief Justice of Manipur High Court. This was cleared by central government on 20 May 2025. He assumed office as 9th Chief Justice of Manipur High Court on 22 May 2025 and retired on 14 September 2025 after serving brief tenure of nearly 4 months.
