= Bishwajit Bhattacharyya =

Addl. Solicitor General of India

Bishwajit Bhattacharyya (born 26 January 1952) is a former Additional Solicitor General of India.

== Biography ==
Bhattacharyya completed his undergraduate studies from St. Stephen's College, Delhi and studied law at Campus Law Centre. He has been a country manager at ANZ Grindlays bank, Senior Advocate of the Supreme Court of India and a visiting faculty at Indian Law Institute, New Delhi. He is also a visiting professor at the Indian Institute of Management, Ahmedabad. As Additional Solicitor General of India (Indirect Taxes), he is credited with winning several big revenue cases for the tax department, including a landmark case against Fiat India Automobiles wherein Fiat India had to pay close to Rs. 432 crores as excise duty to the Government. Another landmark case which he argued and won was the Harshad Mehta securities scam case. Here he appeared for the State Bank of India against the National Housing Bank and the Supreme Court ruled emphatically in favour of State Bank of India and further directed National Housing Bank to refund Rs. 900 crores to the State Bank of India. Besides his background in law and economics, he also has a passion for music.

== His Autobiographical work ==
A day after being relieved from the office, Bhattacharyya's book My Experience with the office of Additional Solicitor General of India was released by former Chief Justice of India J. S. Verma. In the same he alleged that full case files were not given to law officers and the briefs were given just minutes before the court hearing, leaving little time to prepare for arguments.

== Books ==
- Judging the Judges, edited by K. Mahesh and Bishwajit Bhattacharyya. Gyan Pub. House, 1999. ISBN 81-212-0606-5
- My Experience with the Office of Additional Solicitor General of India by Bishwajit Bhattacharyya. Universal Law Pub. Co., 2013. ISBN 9350-3526-5-6
