= Amba Prasad (businessman) =

Indian businessman

Rai Bahadur Amba Prasad
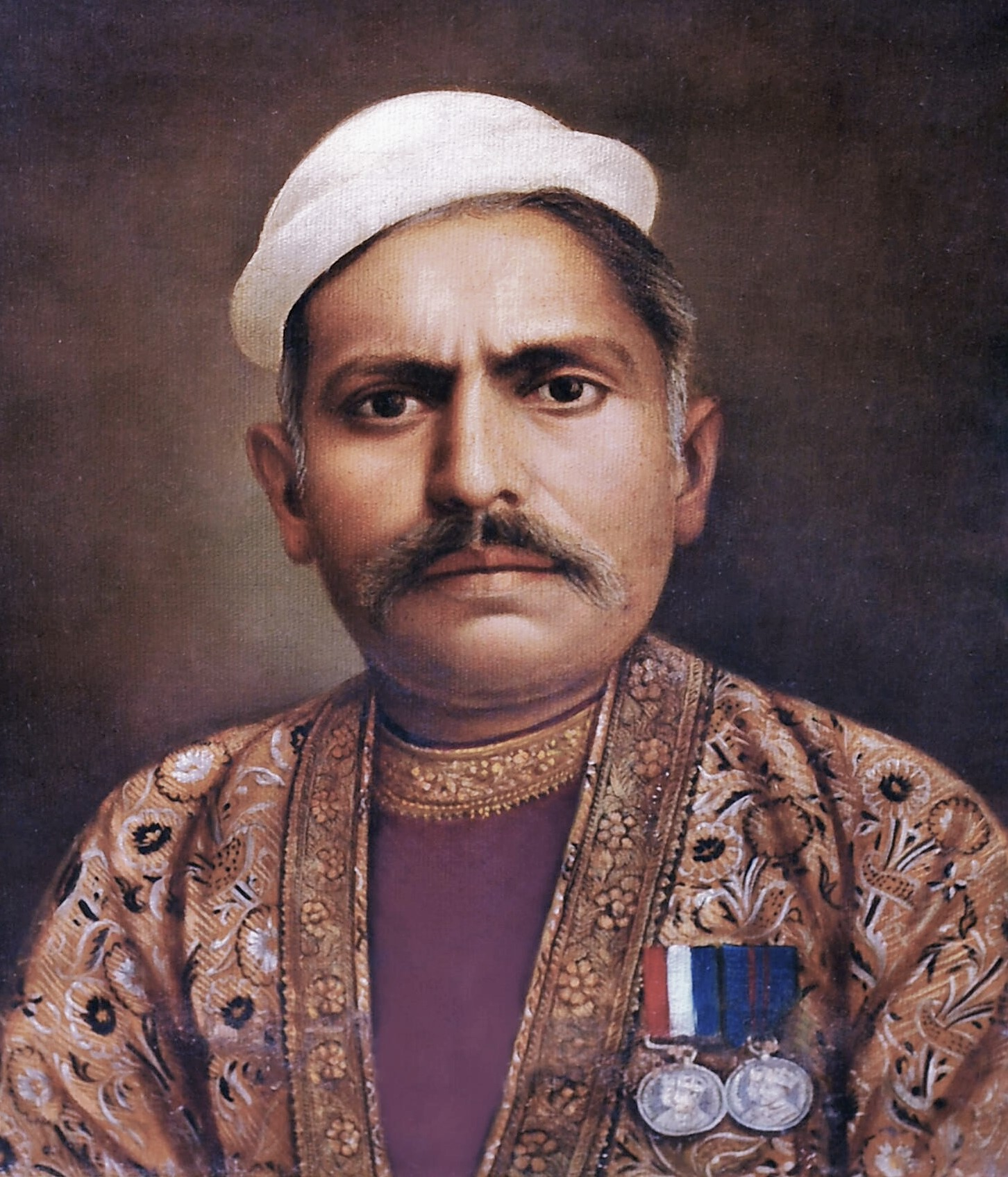
- Amba Pershad at a public function in 1936
- Born: 1860; Delhi, India
- Died: 1950 (aged 89–90)
- Occupation: Philanthropy
- Known for: Business, charitable works

Rai Bahadur Amba Prasad (c. 1860 – 1950) was an Indian businessman and philanthropist.

== Early years ==
Amba Prasad was born in Delhi c. 1860, in an eminent business family. His father, Lala Gopal Rai, and grandfather, Lala Gulab Singh were traders and bankers of Delhi. He studied at the Anglo-Sanskrit Victoria Jubilee High-School.

As a young man he went into manufacturing and trading in dyes and chemicals. He started a trading company, Amba Prasad Jadavjee & Co. and introduced colorful and graphic labels for his products. He later sold the rights to these labels and trademarks to companies including Ciba and Bayer.

=== Philanthropy ===
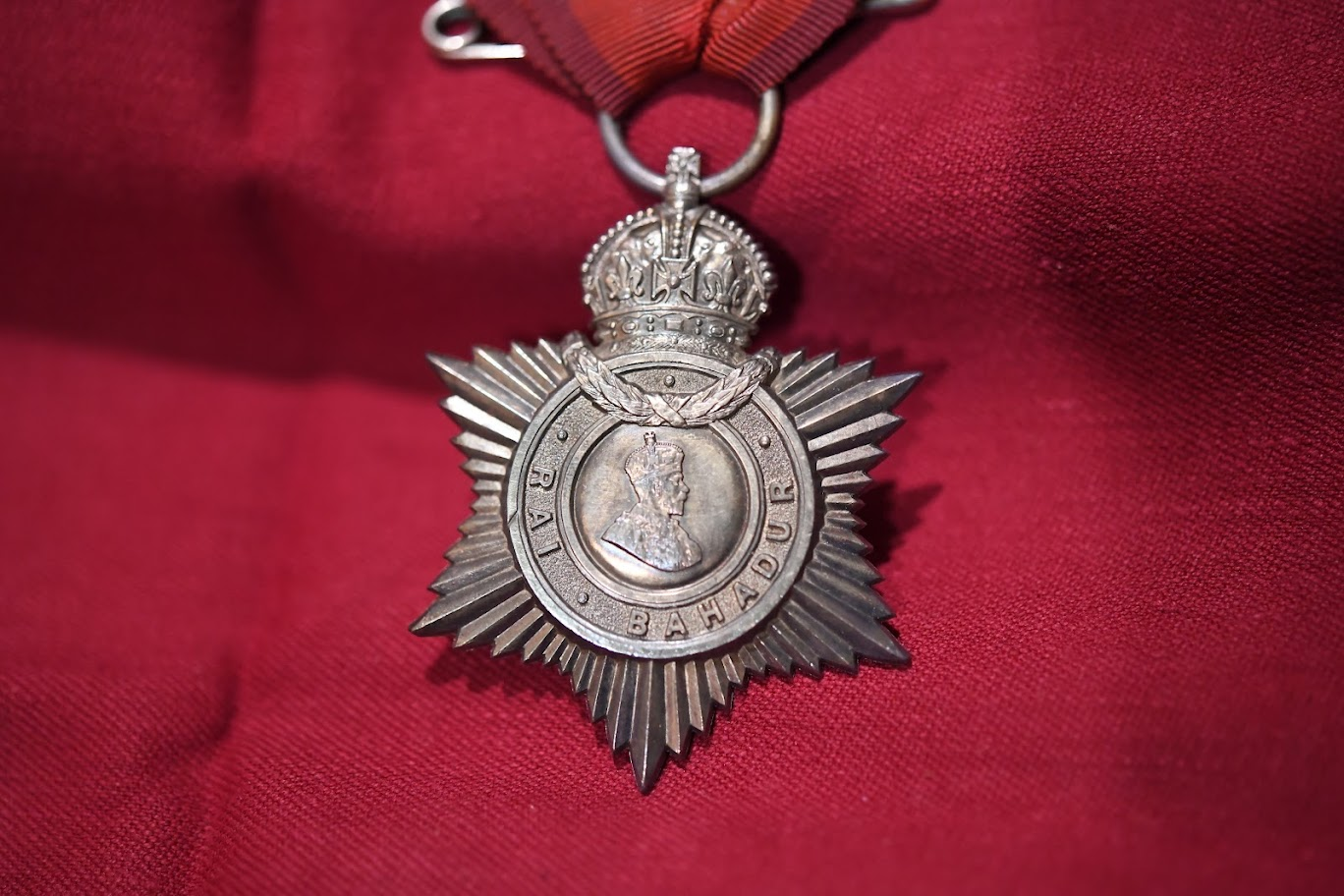

In 1916 he contributed Rs 80,000 to his old school to build a new school building at Daryaganj; the building is known as Amba Prasad Vidyalay, and is now a registered heritage structure. He was also one of the founders of the Hindu College in Delhi.

He died in 1950, aged approximately 90 years.

== Family ==
Bhawani Shanker also built the Amba Cinema named after Amba Pershad, which opened in 1963. In 1992 another landmark of the New Delhi skyline opened, also named after Amba Pershad, Ambadeep Building on Kasturba Gandhi Marg, one of the tallest buildings in Delhi.
