= Hindu College, Delhi =

College of the University of Delhi, India

Hindu College
- Motto: Music of Truth
- Type: Public
- Established: 1899; 127 years ago
- Accreditation: NAAC (A++ Grade)
- Academic affiliations: University of Delhi
- Principal: Anju Srivastava
- Academic staff: 120
- Students: 3,000 +
- Location: Delhi, India
- Campus: Urban
- Website: hinducollege.ac.in

Hindu College is a constituent college of the University of Delhi, located in Delhi, India. Established in 1899, it is one of the oldest and most prestigious institutions of higher education in the country. The college offers undergraduate and postgraduate programmes in the disciplines of arts, humanities, commerce, and sciences, and admits students primarily through the Common University Entrance Test (CUET) conducted by the National Testing Agency. Hindu College is accredited with an A++ grade by the National Assessment and Accreditation Council and has consistently ranked among India's leading colleges in the National Institutional Ranking Framework (NIRF), securing the 1st position in the College category in 2025.

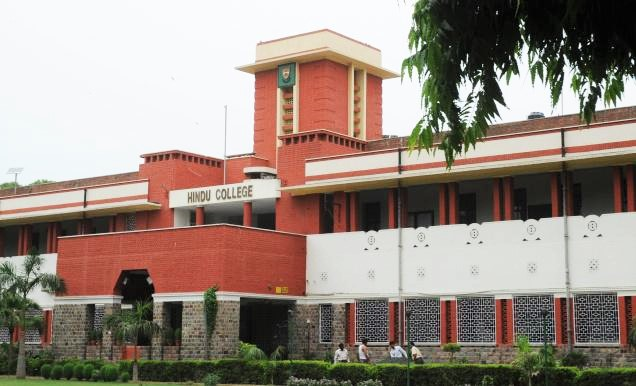
Hindu College

The college has produced many alumni over the years, and has been awarded 'Star College' status for its Department of Biotechnology by the Ministry of Science and Technology.

== History ==
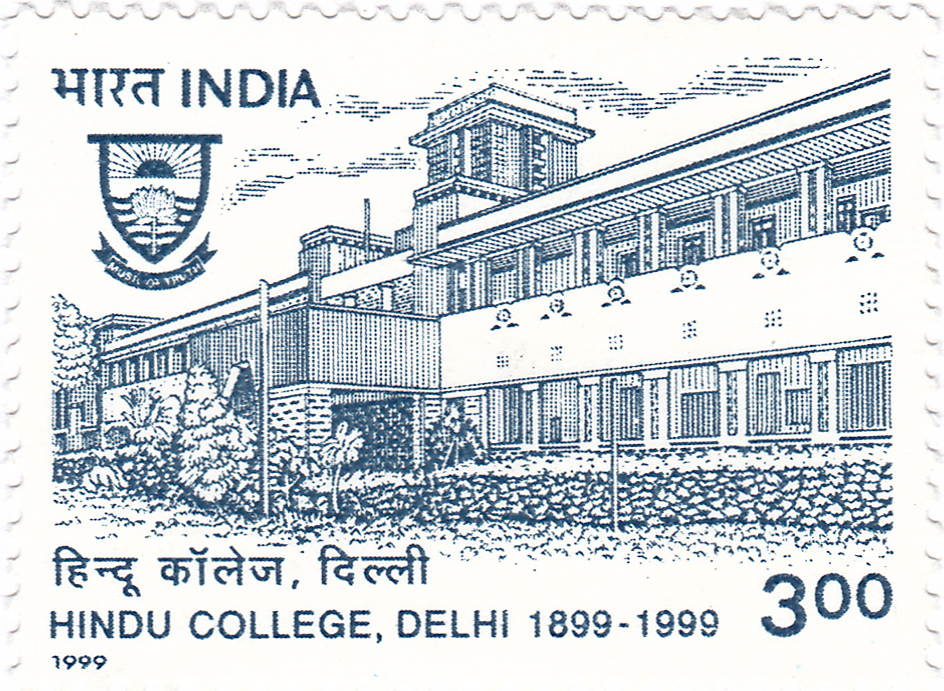
A 1999 stamp dedicated to Hindu College

Hindu College was founded in 1899 by Krishan Dassji Gurwale and Pandit Deen Dayal Sharma in the backdrop of the nationalist struggle against the British Raj. Some prominent citizens, including Rai Bahadur Amba Prasad, Gurwale Ji, decided to start a college that would provide nationalist education to the youth, while being non-elitist and non-sectarian. Originally, the college was housed in a humble building in Kinari Bazar, Chandni Chowk, and it was affiliated to Punjab University as there was no university in Delhi at that time. As the college grew, it faced a major crisis in 1902. The Punjab University warned the college that the university would disaffiliate the college if the college failed to get a proper building of its own. Rai Bahadur Lala Sultan Singh came to rescue the college from this crisis. He donated a part of his historic property, which originally belonged to Colonel James Skinner, at Kashmiri Gate, Delhi, to the college. The college functioned from there till 1953. When the University of Delhi took birth in 1922, Hindu College along with Ramjas College and St. Stephen's College were subsequently affiliated with the University of Delhi, making them the first three institutions to be affiliated with the university.

Hindu College was a centre for intellectual and political debate during India's freedom struggle, especially during the Quit India Movement. It is the only college in Delhi to have a students' parliament since 1935, which provided a platform to many national leaders including Mahatma Gandhi, Motilal Nehru, Jawaharlal Nehru, Sarojini Naidu, Annie Besant, Muhammad Ali Jinnah and Subhash Chandra Bose for motivating the youth. Responding to Gandhi's Quit India Movement in 1942, the college played a substantial role in India's freedom struggle and some of this college's teachers and students<patel> courted arrest. The college also closed its gates for several months.

=== Principals ===
1. B.B. Mookerji, 1899–1906
2. N.N. Roy, 1906–1911
3. P.B. Adhikari, 1911–1915
4. S. Sen, 1915–1917
5. N.V. Thadani, 1917–1928
6. S.K. Sen, 1928–1934
7. N.V. Thadani, 1935–1950
8. A. Bhattacharya, 1950–1957
9. R.N. Mathur, 1958–1964
10. B.M. Bhatia*, 1964–1971, 1973–1980
11. P.C. Verma, 1980–1995
12. S.N. Maheshwari, 1995–1997
13. Kavita A. Sharma, 1998–2008
14. S. Choudhary, 2008–2010
15. Vinay K Srivastava, 2010–2012
16. Pradumn Kumar 2012–2014
17. Anju Srivastava 2014–present

*Dr. B.M. Bhatia was on leave for two years, 1971–1973. During this period, Dr. P.C. Sood was the substituting principal.

== Campus ==
The college is spread across a 25-acre campus. Hindu College's library, founded in 1899, is among the oldest college libraries in the University of Delhi.

Hindu College's boys' Hostel is situated next to the sports complex of the college and provides residential facilities to about two hundred undergraduate and postgraduate male students. A girls' hostel, named Smt Indu Punj Girls' Hostel, began construction in 2013, accommodating 156 female students.

== Academics ==
=== Rankings ===
College rankings

General – India
- NIRF (Colleges) (2023): 2
- NIRF (Colleges) (2024): 1

Hindu College is ranked first among colleges in India by the National Institutional Ranking Framework (NIRF) in 2025.

== Student life ==
=== Student Societies ===
Every department has its own society which is tasked with organising department-specific co-curricular activities. Ibtida is the dramatics society of Hindu College which performs both stage and street plays. It was formed by Imtiaz Ali while he was a student at the college.

Hindu College in 2017 established Electoral Literacy Club (Jagriti). The club conducts the Annual Youth Dialogue at Hindu College as its annual student festival by the name 'DRISHTI and also conduct other important events and enthusiastically celebrates days like Constitution Day, National Voter's Day, etc. It hosts its annual student festival 'DRISHTI: Annual Youth Dialogue', every year. DRISHTI-2026 was organized on 20th March, 2026 at Sanganeria Auditorium, hosting eminent personalities like Shri Yashovardhan Azad, Maj Gen Balraj Mehta, Ms. Ira Singhal, and Ms. Aditi Rajput. The club has hosted personalities like Shri Chirag Paswan, Shri Saurabh Dwivedi, Shri Ashok Shrivastav, Shri Abhinav Pandey, Maj Gen Rajpal Punia, Mr. Abhijeet Yadav in the past.

The women's development cell of the college has been very active in gender sensitisation and after the scrapping of section 377 successfully led pride parades to create awareness about LGBTQ+ rights. Caucus l is the discussion forum of Hindu College and works as a mini think tank. It was founded in 2008 and organises group discussions, speaker sessions, roundtable discussions, runs an active blog on its website www.caucus.in and publishes a monthly magazine The Probe. Caucus also functions as the international cell of the college and is responsible for managing the international collaborations of the college. Recently, they have collaborated with King's College London. The intellectual fest of Hindu College - Compass is also organised annually by Caucus and has hosted various eminent personalities in the past like Prof. Arvind Panagariya, Mr. William Dalrymple, Amb. Shivshanker Menon, Dr. Soumya Swaminathan, Mr. Shekhar Gupta among others. It is one of the most active societies of the college.

Hindu College runs the Naval Wing of NCC since 2004.

The Indian music society, Alankar, holds its annual festival Harmony every year. The English debating society, popularly known as the Debsoc, is representative of an inquiring and active intellectual life on campus. Debsoc is the only debating society at Delhi University to organise four major debates in an academic year.

The Science Forum is a group of diverse science enthusiasts dwelling in Hindu College.

The Symposium Society is the policy and deliberation forum of Hindu College, University of Delhi. The organization follows a 'General Body' structure, with the President and vice-president at the core. Among its many activities the prominent ones are the Prime Ministerial Debate and Interviews, Hindu Darbar, Hindu Mock Indian Parliament (HMIP), and Hindu Policy Forum (HPS). Furthermore, the society promotes independent student journalism through its bimonthly publication- Hindu College Gazette. The publication also reviews and publishes opinions and analyses from scholars and writers from across the country. However, this society has become inactive lately.

Other societies include Abhyas - The Internship Cell; The Finance & Investment Cell; Abhirang, the Hindi Dramatic Society; Adhrita, The Indian Dance Society, that works to maintain culture and heritage and conduct the only dance fest of DU; Abstraction, the Fine Arts Society; Aria, the Western Music Society; Manthan, the Quiz Society; Global Association of Economics Education Hindu Chapter, the Economics and Research Society; Srijya, the Contemporary Dance Society; Scribe: The Literary Society; Masque, The English Dramatic Society; Vagmi, the Hindi Debating Society; and Vivre, The Film and Photography Society, the Entrepreneurship Cell, or more commonly just Ecell.

=== Students' Parliament ===
The college has a Students' Parliament. The Hindu College Parliament is a unique student organisation in the country. All the students and teachers of the college are its members. The students elect the Prime Minister from amongst themselves at the beginning of the year. There is also a Leader of the Opposition. The Speaker of the Parliament is a teacher nominated by the Principal in his/her capacity as the President of the Hindu College Republic. The College Parliament is a forum for discussions on academic and other issues. It allocates funds to various societies. The parliament is in continuous operation since 1935. Members of the Cabinet of students' Parliament are elected by students. The students' parliament takes care of student demands.

== Notable alumni ==
The alumni of Hindu College are called Hinduites.

- Aakash Chopra, Indian cricketer
- Abhishek Chaubey, film director
- Adarsh Shastri, former sales head, Apple Inc. India; political activist, MLA, Dwarka, NCT of Delhi, National Spokesperson, AAP of Aam Aadmi Party
- Aditya Dhar, film director
- Aditya Tamang, Indian politician, Member of Sikkim Legislative Assembly
- Agha Shahid Ali, Poet and Professor
- Ajai Malhotra, Indian Foreign Service Officer; Ambassador of India to Russian Federation
- Ajay Bijili, Founder and MD of PVR Cinemas
- Ajay Jadeja, Indian cricketer
- Amitava Kumar, journalist, professor of English at Vassar College
- Anil Shorey, Infantry officer in Indian Army; writer
- Ansh Chauhan, Investment Banker
- Arjun Rampal, actor
- Arnab Goswami, former Editor-in-Chief of Times Now and Chief Editor and co-founder of Republic TV
- Ashish Kothari, environmentalist
- Ashish Vidyarthi, Indian film and TV actor and theatre personality
- Bipan Chandra, historian and former professor of Modern History at Jawaharlal Nehru University
- Brahma Chellaney, author; professor at Centre for Policy Research
- Deep Dasgupta, Indian cricketer
- Harini Amarasuriya, 16th Prime minister of Sri Lanka
- Eenam Gambhir, The First Secretary in the Permanent Mission of India to the United Nations.
- Gautam Gambhir, Indian cricketer, politician, and BCCI coach
- Hardeep Singh Puri, Cabinet minister, Indian Foreign Service officer; former Permanent Representative of India to the United Nations (2009–13)
- Ila Patnaik, Principal Economic Advisor, Ministry of Finance of India
- Imtiaz Ali, Film director
- Imran Zahid, actor
- Jasleen Royal, singer-songwriter
- Kadambari Murali, Editor-in-Chief of Sports Illustrated India
- Kavita Ramdas, President and CEO of Global Fund for Women
- Leela Gandhi, Professor of English at University of Chicago
- Loveleen Tandan, film director
- Luv Ranjan, film director
- Mahesh Rangarajan, historian
- Mallika Dua, comic and snapchat celebrity.
- Manish Tiwary, film director
- Manoj Kumar, actor
- Manvinder Bisla, Indian cricketer
- Mayanti Langer, journalist
- Meenakshi Lekhi, national spokesperson of Bharatiya Janata Party
- Mira Aggarwal, politician; Mayor of Delhi
- Mirza Farhatullah Baig, Urdu writer
- Nupur Sharma, politician
- Pankaj Kumar Singh, Indian police service officer & 29th Director General of the Border Security Force
- Papiya Ghosh, historian; Professor of History at Patna University
- Pema Khandu, 9th Chief Minister of Arunachal Pradesh
- P. N. Dhar, Principal Secretary to Prime Minister Office, India
- Poonam Gupta (economist), Deputy Governor of Reserve Bank of India
- Rajesh Talwar, writer and lawyer; works for the United Nations
- Rakesh Ranjan Kumar, film director
- Rakesh Sinha, Member of Parliament Rajya Sabha
- Hemant Singh, titular Maharaj Rana of Dholpur
- Rao Inderjit Singh, Minister of State, India
- Rao Narbir Singh, politician
- Rekha Bhardwaj, singer
- Roshan Abbas, presenter
- Sandeep P Parekh, securities and corporate lawyer
- Sanjeev Goyal, economist; Professor of Economics at University of Cambridge
- Saqib Saleem, actor and model
- Shaurya Doval, politician & policy expert
- Shiv Panditt, actor
- Shivaji Sondhi, Wykeham Professor in the Department of Physics, University of Oxford
- Sidhant Mohapatra, Indian Actor
- Siddhartha Basu, businessman
- Subramanian Swamy, economist, politician and former Ministry of Commerce and Industry (India)
- Tabu Ram Taid, author
- Tahir Raj Bhasin, actor
- Tisca Chopra, actress
- T. S. Singh Deo, Former Deputy Chief Minister of Chhattisgarh
- Vikram Misri, 35th Foreign Secretary (India)
- Vinod Rai, 11th Comptroller and Auditor General of India and former Interim President of BCCI
- Vishal Bhardwaj, film director and music composer
