= Eenam Gambhir =

First Secretary of India in United Nations

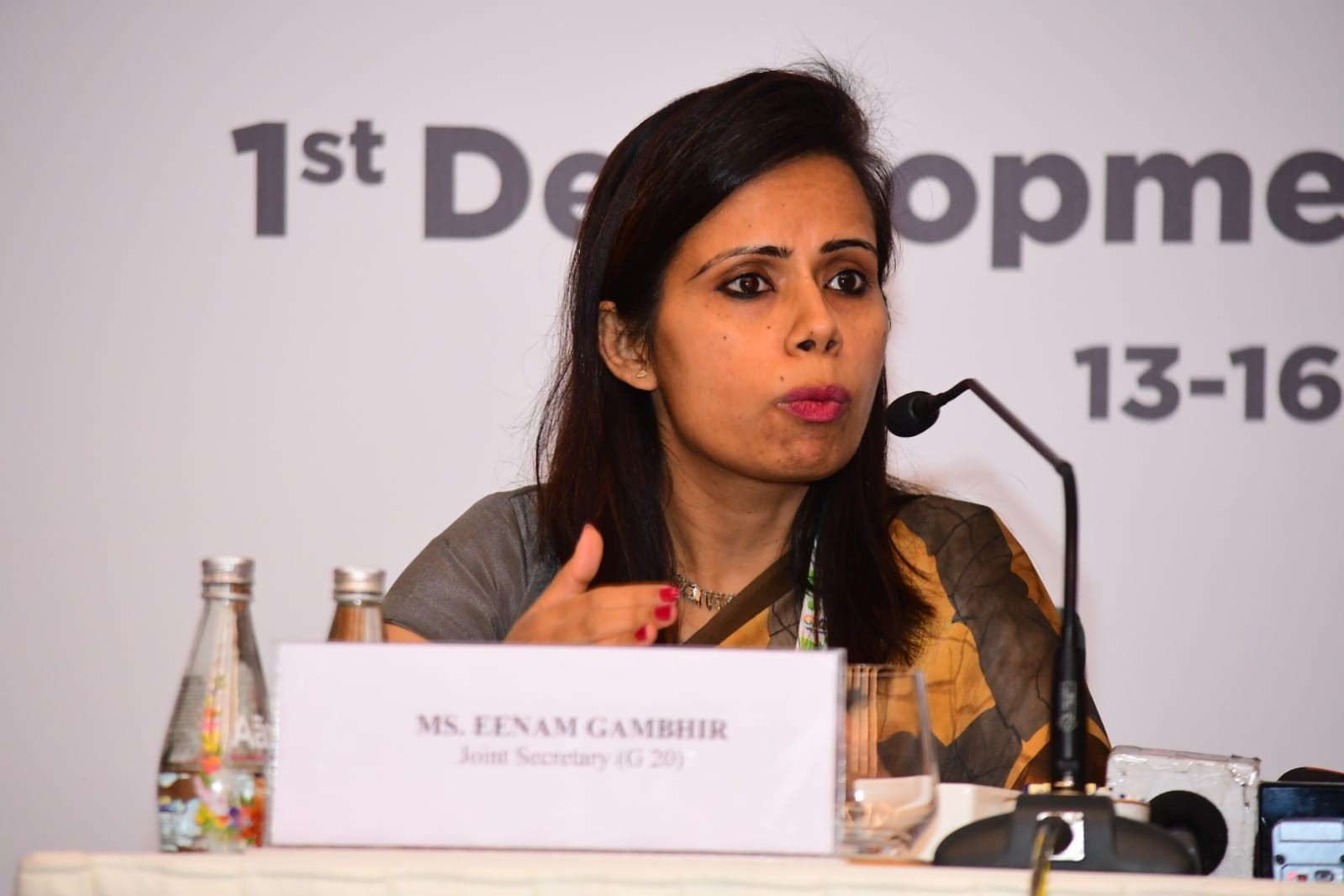
- Born: 24 July 1983 (age 43); New Delhi, India
- Education: Hindu College; Delhi University; Geneva University
- Occupations: Diplomat IFS

Counsellor, Permanent Mission of India to the United Nations

Eenam Gambhir (born 24 July 1983) is an Indian diplomat of the Indian Foreign Service (IFS) who is currently posted as a Counsellor in the Permanent Mission of India to the United Nations in New York. She is a 2005-batch IFS officer and is presently posted at the Permanent Mission of India to the UN at New York.

In UN, Eenam Gambhir is representing India for the "Security Council Reform, Counter-terrorism, Cyber security issues, Security Council (regional issues), All Special Missions including those approved by UNSC, NAM coordination and Outreach w Universities/Colleges - Coordination" related topics.

Indian media outlets reported her criticism of Pakistan in the United Nations' General Assembly. She stated that "the land of Taxila, the greatest site of learning in ancient India, is now host to the Ivy league of terrorists around the globe".
