= Shorey House =

Shorey House may refer to:

in the United States

- Shorey House, a student residential "house", in International House, part of the Housing at the University of Chicago, in Illinois
- Charles Shorey House, Hillsboro, Oregon, listed on the National Register of Historic Places
