= Faculty of Law, University of Delhi =

Law School of the University of Delhi

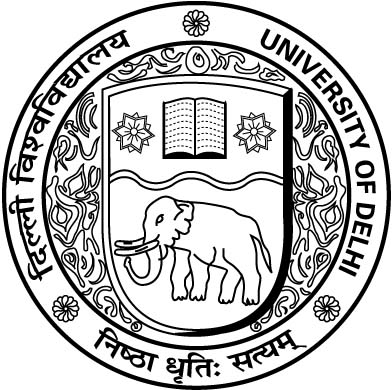
- Motto: "Dedication, Steadfastness and Truth"
- Type: Law School
- Established: 1924; 102 years ago
- Parent institution: University of Delhi
- Affiliations: University of Delhi
- Dean: Dr. Anju Vali Tikoo
- Faculty: 130
- Students: 9000
- Location: Faculty of Law, University Enclave, New Delhi, Delhi, India
- Website: lawfaculty.du.ac.in

The Faculty of Law, University of Delhi is the law department of the University of Delhi. It has the unique distinction of producing the largest number of sitting judges of the Supreme Court of India, with many notable alumni from various fields.

It is situated in the north campus of the University of Delhi and has more than 130 teachers and about 10000 students as of 2021 including LL.B., LL.M., and Ph.D. students.

The Faculty of Law operates through four centres within its campus, namely, Campus Law Centre, Law Centre-I, Law Centre-II and the newly-introduced 5-Year Integrated Law Course.

== History ==
=== Early years ===
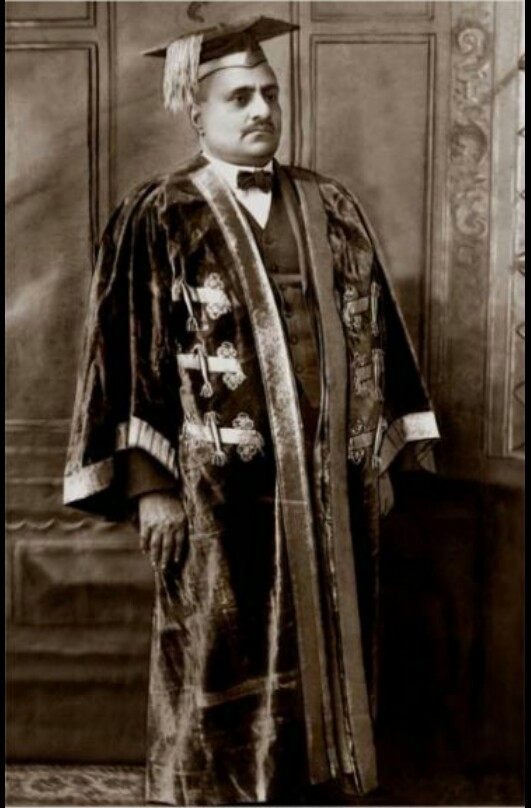
Dr. Hari Singh Gour, first Dean of the Faculty of Law, University of Delhi

The Faculty of Law was established in 1924. The then Vice-Chancellor of the University of Delhi, and himself a great lawyer, jurist, and educationist, Dr. Hari Singh Gour was the first Dean of the Faculty of Law. The Faculty was initially housed in the Prince's Pavilion in the Old Viceregal Lodge Grounds. It was only in 1963 that the faculty moved to its present location at the Chhatra Marg, University of Delhi, Delhi.

The Bachelor of laws (LL.B.) degree course was, initially, started as a two-year part-time course, teaching being conducted in the morning with ten teachers. In 1942, along with the morning, evening classes were also started. In 1944, the one-year Master of laws (LL.M.) degree course was introduced.

In 1947, after Independence and partition of the country, the demand for the study of law increased. It was also time to look beyond the entrenched British model and restructure legal education to meet the demands of a now Independent India clamouring for equality in access to power, respect and knowledge. Lawyers played a major role in the struggle for freedom. They now had to be trained to create & use law as an instrument of social change and, as Nehru put it, to wipe a tear from every eye.

In 1947, LL.B. was made a full-time course (classes being held both in the morning and evening) and new courses were added. LL.M. was made a whole time two-year course. Two new courses, namely, Certificate of Proficiency (Law) and Bachelor of Civil Laws (B.C.L.) were introduced (later abolished in 1961 and 1966, respectively).

=== One of the Leading Innovators in Legal Education ===
The year 1966 was a turning point in the history of the Faculty of Law and legal education in the country. Dean Professor P.K. Tripathi and his team of dedicated teachers adopted and implemented almost all the recommendations, in the 1964 Report, of the Gajendragadkar Committee on Legal Education (appointed by Vice-Chancellor Dr. C.D. Deshmukh).

The two-year LL.B. course was transitioned into the three-year (six semester) course with an internal examination at the end of each semester.

Delhi University Law School made major innovations in the method of teaching. Professor P.K. Tripathi introduced the discussion method of teaching (the Socratic method of teaching) and moved away from the lecture method where students were merely passive recipients of information. Towards this end, the case method of teaching, with decided cases and other study materials being given to the students in advance, was introduced, which enabled the Delhi Law School to achieve the goal of making students active participants in the learning process, thereby also ensuring an in-depth study of law. Teacher participation in the management of the Law School was ensured through appointment of various committee with elected members.

As the number of students grew, the department established its first Centre as Law Centre – I at Mandir Marg in 1970 and the second as Law Centre – II at Dhaula Kuan in 1971. The LL.B day classes of the Faculty of Law were rechristened and shifted to newly established Campus Law Centre in 1975. Today, all centers of the department operate from the Faculty of Law campus in North Campus.

== Academics ==
=== Admission ===
National Testing Agency (NTA) conducts CUET PG and CLAT UG in order to shortlist aspirants for admission in the LL.B. programme for 3 and 5 year law courses respectively. Candidates need to score the minimum required marks in the Entrance Exam to be eligible to take part in the first counselling round for the LL.B. programme admissions.

=== Eligibility ===
Aspirants need to meet the entrance exam's eligibility criteria as mentioned by Faculty of Law, Delhi University. Eligible candidates need to have at least completed their graduation from a recognised Indian University/Foreign University/Equivalent institution from any stream with minimum 50% marks. Also, candidates in the final year of their graduation/post-graduation are eligible to apply for the Entrance Exam. However, such candidates will be offered admission on a provisional basis (which will be subject to their clearing their degree examinations).

== Faculty of Law - Centres ==
=== Campus Law Center ===
The Campus Law Centre (CLC) of the Faculty of Law offers a full-time three-year LL.B. programme. Its classes starts from 8:00 am and ends at 5:00 pm.

Originally, classes were held in the morning. When evening classes started (which became Law Centre-I) and later Law Centre-II was formed, the original day classes were designated as the Campus Law Centre (CLC) around 1975

=== Law Center-I ===
About Law Centre-1 Law Centre-I was established in the year 1970 in Kashmere Gate. Soon it was relocated in a School at Mandir Marg. In 1994, Law Centre-1 was relocated to the North Campus of Delhi University at Chhatra Marg, within the premises of Faculty of Law. The year 2015 saw allocation of another five story building to the centre, namely, Umang Bhawan, by the University of Delhi. Presently the centre functions from this building as well as another set of buildings located adjacent to the Umang Bhawan. LC-I is an evening college whereby classes are held from 2:00 pm to 7:00 pm.

=== Law Center-II ===
Law Centre-II is one of the institutions in the country which imparts a three-year LL.B. program. To promote student activities at the Centre, a number of committees have been constituted. These committees include Moot Court and Debate Committee, Seminars, Conferences and Extension Lectures, Journal Committee, Legal Aid Committee, Placement Committee and Alumni Committee. There is the active participation of students in these committees. The teacher members and students volunteers organize several activities on a regular basis throughout the year. The S.K. Puri Memorial Moot Court Competition of Law Centre-II "JUSTIFIED" is an annual activity in which teams from all parts of the country participate. The Seminars and Lectures Committee apart from organizing seminars, conferences, and workshops organizes lectures of legal scholars from all over India and abroad. Classes in LC-II are held from 8:00 am to 2:00 pm

=== Integrated Law Course ===
The University of Delhi offers five-year integrated undergraduate law programs, namely the B.A. LL.B. (Hons.) and B.B.A. LL.B. (Hons.), introduced in 2023 under its Faculty of Law. These programs are designed for students who have completed their higher secondary education and combine legal education with interdisciplinary studies in arts or business administration. Admission is based on performance in the Common Law Admission Test (CLAT), followed by seat allocation through the university’s centralized admission process. The courses are approved by the Bar Council of India and are conducted at the university’s North Campus. As relatively recent additions, the programs are still developing their academic and professional ecosystems, including placement networks and alumni base, while benefiting from the established reputation of the University of Delhi in legal education.

== Pedagogy ==
=== Case Method ===
The teaching and learning methods in the Faculty of Law are participatory in nature. Delhi University Law School follows the Case Method as the primary mode of teaching and learning. Introduced in the 1960s by Professor P.K. Tripathi, the Case Method, a distinctive Delhi version of the Langdellian Casebook Method of teaching law in law schools in the United States, entails a questioning mindset among teachers and students. The method is based on the principle that the best way to study the Indian legal system and relevant laws is from precedent, i.e. a principle or rule established in a previous legal case that is either binding on or persuasive for a court or other tribunal when deciding subsequent cases with similar issues or facts.

Each semester, the Faculty of Law selects illustrative and landmark cases as decided by the Supreme Court of India or High Courts to be included in a special text-book called the Case Material for each course. The Case Materials may also contain some important articles and commentaries on the relevant area of law. The Case Materials are supplemented by the "Bare Acts" or statutes and prescribed books in each course.

Typically, the teacher assigns reading of selected cases from the Case Material for the subsequent class. Students are expected to come to the class after reading the prescribed cases. A class in the Faculty of Law commences with a discussion based on the assigned case between students and the teacher, followed by a quick reading of the issue and ratio decidendi of the judgement.

== Publications ==
=== Delhi Law Review (DLR), ISSN: 097-4936 ===
Delhi Law review is a peer-reviewed and refereed journal published by the Faculty of Law, University of Delhi since the year 1978. DLR provides an intellectual platform to legal fraternity to express their opinions in the form of articles, case comments, book reviews, etc.

=== Journal of the Campus Law Centre (JCLC), ISSN: 2321-4716 ===
Journal of the Campus Law Centre is a refereed journal published by Campus Law Centre, University of Delhi, Delhi since the year 2013. It seeks to provide a platform to the legal fraternity for expressing their views, ideas and research undertaken by them. It invites original and previously unpublished articles, notes and comments from academic, judges, lawyers, research scholars on any contemporary legal and socio-legal issue.

=== National Capital Law Journal, ISSN: 0972-0936 ===
National Capital Law Journal is published by Law Centre-II, Faculty of Law, University of Delhi, Delhi since the year 1996. It invites articles, papers, case notes, book reviews and essays every year from academics, independent researchers, practitioners and students.

=== Journal of Law Teachers of India (JOLT-I), ISSN: 2231-1580 ===
Journal of Law Teachers of India is the flagship journal of Law Centre-I, Faculty of Law, Delhi. The first volume of JOLT-I was brought out in association with Association of Law Teachers of India (ALT-I) in the year 2010. The main objective of JOLT-I is to encourage good legal writing on all areas of law and research among students and teaching faculty alike. All the papers are reviewed before publication. The journal has an advisory board as well as editorial board comprising eminent Scholars.

=== Delhi Law Review, Student Edition, ISSN: 0973-00IX ===
This is a student driven academic journal covering a diverse range of themes and topics of contemporary significance. The journal comprises articles from students within the Faculty of Law, University of Delhi and outside of it. The articles are selected on the basis of a double-blind peer-review system. Its first online edition was released in 2016-2017.

== Library ==

The Law Faculty Library, University of Delhi was established in July, 1924. It has over one lakh fifty thousand books and a large number of law reports and journals. It subscribes to nearly 140 national and international journals.

== Moot Court ==
Every year the Faculty of Law organizes and hosts national and international level moot court competitions. Students from law schools participate in simulated court proceedings, usually involving drafting memorials or memorandum and participating in oral argument.

- K K Luthra International Moot court by Campus Law Centre.
- NHRC & LC-1 National Moot Court Competition on Human Rights by Law Centre-I
- The All Delhi (NCR) Moot Court Competition by Law Centre-I
- Justified - National Moot Court Competition by Law Centre-II

== Legal Services Programme ==
The Faculty has a comprehensive programme for clinical legal education with a view to undertake activities such as moot courts, legal aid services, legal awareness and professional skills development for its students.

The Faculty has been running a Legal Services Programme since the early seventies. The main objective of Legal Services Programme are to:(a) impart clinical legal education, (b) provide social service opportunities, and (c) impart socially relevant legal education.

=== Activities ===
- Project Saksham 4.O
- Project Saksham 3.O
- Students run a Legal Services Clinic at the University premises
- Legal awareness programmes
- Legal outreaches in slum-clusters
- Prison visits
- Lok Adalat (Alternative Dispute Resolution)
- Nukkad Natak (Street Plays)
- Placement Assistance Council consisting of student bodies.

== Infrastructure ==
=== Faculty of Law Campus ===
The campus is situated in the North Campus of Delhi University. The academic & administrative buildings consist of the classrooms, seminar halls, the libraries, the moot court hall, legal aid hall, pantry, underground parking, lawns and administrative offices of each Law Center. In the year 2016, the Faculty of Law inaugurated Umang Bhawan, a new building, spread over 90,000 sqft, which could accommodate the three Law Centers as per the norms laid down by the Bar Council of India (BCI). The new building is situated next to the Arts Faculty campus. It is at a distance of 400 meters from the old building of Faculty of Law. Currently both buildings are operational.

=== Hostel Accommodation ===
There are twelve hostels for male and female students who are pursuing full-time courses in the University. These are: Gwyer Hall, International Students House, Jubilee hall, Mansarovar Hostel, Post-Graduate Men's Hostel, University Hostel for Women, Meghdoot Hostel, D. S. Kothari, V. K. R. V. Rao Hostel, International Students House for Women, North East Students House and W.U.S. University Hostel.

Hostel facilities are available only to Campus Law Center, Law Center-1, and LL.M. 2-year course students as per rules and procedure prescribed by the University and the hostel authorities.

=== Sports Facilities ===
The Delhi University Sports Complex (Delhi University Stadium) is an indoor and outdoor sports arena spread across 10,000 square metres within the North Campus of Delhi University. The complex includes coaching area for women’s wrestling, netball, athletics and boxing. Commonwealth Games of 2010 were conducted here, including the Rugby Sevens tournament.

== Notable alumni ==
=== Governors ===
==== Former ====
- O. P. Verma - Former Governor of Punjab, Former Governor of Haryana, Former Chief Justice of Kerala High Court.

=== Judges of the Supreme Court of India ===
==== Current ====
- P. S. Narasimha
- P. V. Sanjay Kumar
- B. V. Nagarathna

==== Former ====
- Sanjiv Khanna, 51st Chief Justice of India
- Dhananjaya Y. Chandrachud, 50th Chief Justice of India
- Madan Mohan Puncchi - 28th Chief Justice of India
- Ranjan Gogoi - 46th Chief Justice of India
- Vikramajit Sen
- Lokeshwar Singh Panta
- Madan B. Lokur
- Arjan Kumar Sikri
- Rohinton Nariman, also a former Solicitor General of India
- Indu Malhotra
- Navin Sinha
- Sanjay Kishan Kaul
- Hima Kohli
- Shripathi Ravindra Bhat
- Hrishikesh Roy

=== Judges of International Supreme Courts ===
- Tshering Wangchuk - Current Chief Justice of Supreme Court of Bhutan
- Rinzin Penjor - Judge of Supreme Court of Bhutan

=== Judges of High Court ===
- T. Vaiphei - Former Chief Justice of Tripura High Court
- Aruna Suresh - Former judge of Delhi High Court and Orissa High Court
- Justice Alexander Thomas, Present judge, Kerala High Court
- Siddharth Mridul - Judge of Delhi High Court

=== Law Officers of Government ===
- Pinky Anand - Additional Solicitor General of India
- Bishwajit Bhattacharyya - Former Additional Solicitor General of India.
- Gopal Subramaniam Former Solicitor General of India
- Mohan Parasaran- Former Solicitor General of India
- Siddharth Luthra - Former Additional Solicitor General of India.

=== Politics ===
- Kumari Mayawati - Former Chief Minister of Uttar Pradesh
- Jarbom Gamlin - Former Chief Minister of Arunachal Pradesh
- Rajendra Pal Gautam - former Cabinet Minister, Govt. of Delhi
- Bhupinder Singh Hooda - Former chief minister of Haryana
- Arun Jaitley - Former Finance Minister, Government of India.
- Ajit Jogi - Former Chief Minister of Chhattisgarh.
- Ashwani Kumar - Former Law Minister, Government of India
- Meira Kumar - Former Speaker of Lok Sabha.
- Pinaki Misra - Member of Parliament
- Kiren Rijiju - Union Law Minister
- Kapil Sibal - Former Cabinet Minister of Human Resource Development, Communications and Information Technology and Ministry of Law.
- Rao Inderjit Singh - Minister of State (Independent Charge), Statistics and Program Implementation.
- Manish Tewari - Former Minister of State (Independent Charge), Information and Broadcasting.
- Vijay Goel - Former Minister of Parliamentary Affairs.

=== Civil Servants ===
- Kiran Bedi - Former Director General at the Bureau of Police Research and Development.
- D.B. Singh - Secretary of Rajya Sabha
- M. Damodaran, former Chairperson of Securities and Exchange Board of India
- T. S. Tirumurti - Is an Indian civil servant who belongs to the Indian Foreign Service cadre. He is currently the Permanent Representative of India to the United Nations. The Permanent Representatives (UN Ambassador) is the head of the Permanent Mission to the United Nations in New York City.
- Rajesh Talwar - is a former international civil servant with the United Nations; prolific author
- Baljeet Tjinder - Is an Indian mathematician, computer engineer, and biochemical scientist. Currently employed in Virginia, United States.
