= Agricultural Promotion and Investment Corporation of Odisha Limited =

Agricultural Promotion and Investment Corporation of Odisha Limited (APICOL)
- Company type: State-owned enterprise
- Industry: Agricultural promotion and investment
- Founded: 1996
- Headquarters: 326 Baramunda, Bhubaneswar, Odisha, India
- Area served: Odisha
- Key people: Rajesh Verma (IAS & CEO); Pravat Kumar Roul (managing director)
- Products: Agricultural products
- Website: www.apicol.co.in

The Agricultural Promotion & Investment Corporation of Odisha Limited (APICOL) is a Government of Odisha public sector undertaking, incorporated on 1 March 1996 to foster enterprise in agriculture as envisaged in the State Agriculture Policy of 1996. It began operations on 1 June 1996 with the primary goal of promoting agro-based industries and food processing industries, including commercial agriculture, horticulture, animal husbandry, and fisheries, to promote investment in agriculture and related sector.

== History ==
In 2019, APICOL and Professional Assistance for Development Action (PRADAN), a national-level not-for-profit organization, entered into an agreement to implement the Agriculture Entrepreneurship Promotion Scheme (AEPS) in selected tribal blocks of the state. In the same year, APICOL signed another MoU with CSC e-Governance Services India Limited (CSC-SPV), a central government entity, to implement the Mukhyamantri Krushi Udyog Yojana (MKUY), which was launched on 1 June 2018.

== Subsidiaries ==
- Capital Investment Subsidy (CIS) for Commercial Agri Enterprises (CAE) and Agro Service Centers (ASC)
