= Anil Shorey =

Col Anil Shorey is an infantry officer and a writer with more than 30 years of combat / active service in various corners of India and abroad, who served as official spokesman for the Indian army. A Kargil War veteran, he has had a first-hand experience in counter insurgency operations in Jammu & Kashmir and the north-east, . He holds twin Diplomas in Journalism from Dateline Delhi and Manchester, UK.

He was specially handpicked for an overseas UN assignment in Somalia as PRO and Chief Spokesman of the 5000 strong Indian Army contingent that operated there. After a few prestigious tenures as Colonel General Staff of an active Division in J&K and Army HQ, Delhi, he recently superannuated from his last appointment as the PRO and Chief Spokesman of Indian Army, South Block, New Delhi.

He has written hundreds of articles in various Indian and international magazines and journals on defence issues and travel experiences; authored more than 25 books on a variety of defence subjects to include famous battles, military and regimental history; and has edited many prestigious college and defence journals. Many of his books are bestsellers globally through Amazon.com & eBay, apart from being presented by the Government of India to 200 universities of India and seven universities oversees.

He was the editor of The Owl, an official journal of the Defence Services Staff College, Wellington, India, and was also the editor of the first three issues of an official journal of Indian Army, Infantry Plus. He launched these at the exalted level of National Geographic, and its publication is continuing till date.

He created and officially registered a personalised brand name of 'Force Multipliers', the main division of which handles defence and allied publications. He has published more than 30 coffee table books and text books on military / regimental histories; biographies; joint doctrines of the Indian Army, Navy and Air Force; Regimental glossy journals, news letters et al. The other divisions of Force Multipliers handle defence websites; designing and erecting war memorials; defence / war related paintings and sketches; defence related audio-visual films; sound and light shows etc.

Presently he is a military historian, a defence analyst and commentator, and is writing eight more books of defence matters, including a series of Joint Inter Service Operational Doctrines.

Col Shorey has received two awards for outstanding poetic achievements from the 'National Library of Poetry', Maryland (USA) and 'The American Poetry Association' (USA). He was recently also awarded the 'Distinguished Alumni Award' for creative writing by his alma mater – Hindu College, University of Delhi. He is also associated with the production of many army audio-visual films, apart from writing scripts for them.

A specialist on Indian and international media, he is the architect of the Indian Army's current Media Policy; the revised edition of the Ministry of Defence's Field Technical Publicity Rules, and delivers media related lectures in various Army divisions and corps. He is also a faculty member of the Indian Army's Centre of UN Peacekeeping, New Delhi, and imparts lectures to Indian and foreign defence and police officials earmarked for UN Peacekeeping assignments. His topics are related to UN Media and Public Information Policies in various Mission Areas worldwide.
