= Odisha State Financial Corporation =

State financial corporation of Odisha, India

- Type: Government
- Industry: Finance
- Founded: 1956
- Headquarters: Odisha State Financial Corporation Building, Cuttack, Odisha, India
- Area served: Odisha
- Key people: Shri Panchanan Dash; ISS, CMD
- Website: www.osfcindia.com

The Odisha State Financial Corporation, formerly known as Orissa State Financial Corporation is a state financial corporation of Odisha. The corporation was established in 1956 under the State Financial Corporations Act, 1951 and State Financial Corporations (Amendment) Act 2000 with the main object of providing loan assistance to the micro, small and medium enterprises.

As per the MoUs, the annual dividends of the State Public Sector Enterprises should be paid to the State Government. The PSU incurred losses at the end of March 2023.

== Branch offices ==
- Angul
- Balangir
- Balasore
- Berhampur
- Bhadrak
- Bhawanipatna
- Bhubaneswar
- Cuttack
- Dhenkanal
- Jajpur
- Jeypore
- Khurda
- Paradip
- Phulbani
- Puri
- Rourkela
- Sambalpur
