= Sanjay V. Gangapurwala =

Chief Justice of Madras High Court

Hon'ble Chief Justice (Retd.) Sanjay Vijaykumar Gangapurwala

Chief Justice of Madras High Court
- In office 28 May 2023 – 23 May 2024
- Nominated by: Dhananjaya Y. Chandrachud
- Appointed by: Droupadi Murmu

Acting Chief Justice of Bombay High Court
- In office 12 December 2022 – 27 May 2023
- Appointed by: Droupadi Murmu

Judge of Bombay High Court
- In office 13 March 2010 – 11 December 2022
- Nominated by: K. G. Balakrishnan
- Appointed by: Pratibha Patil

Personal details
- Born: 24 May 1962 (age 63)

Sanjay Vijaykumar Gangapurwala (born 24 May 1962) is a retired Indian judge and a senior advocate practising at the Supreme Court of India. He is former Chief Justice of Madras High Court and a former Acting Chief Justice of Bombay High Court. He has also served as Judge of Bombay High Court.

On 28 May 2023 he took charge as the 52nd Chief Justice of the prestigious Madras High Court. Tamilnadu Governor R. N. Ravi administered the oath of office to Justice SV Gangapurwala in the swearing-in ceremony at Raj Bhavan, Tamilnadu.
