= Pankaj Singh =

Pankaj Singh may refer to:

- Pankaj Singh (cricketer) (born 1985), Indian cricketer
- Pankaj Singh (politician) (born 1978), Indian politician, BJP General Secretary for Uttar Pradesh
