= Noida =

City in Uttar Pradesh, India

- City
- New Okhla Industrial Development Authority
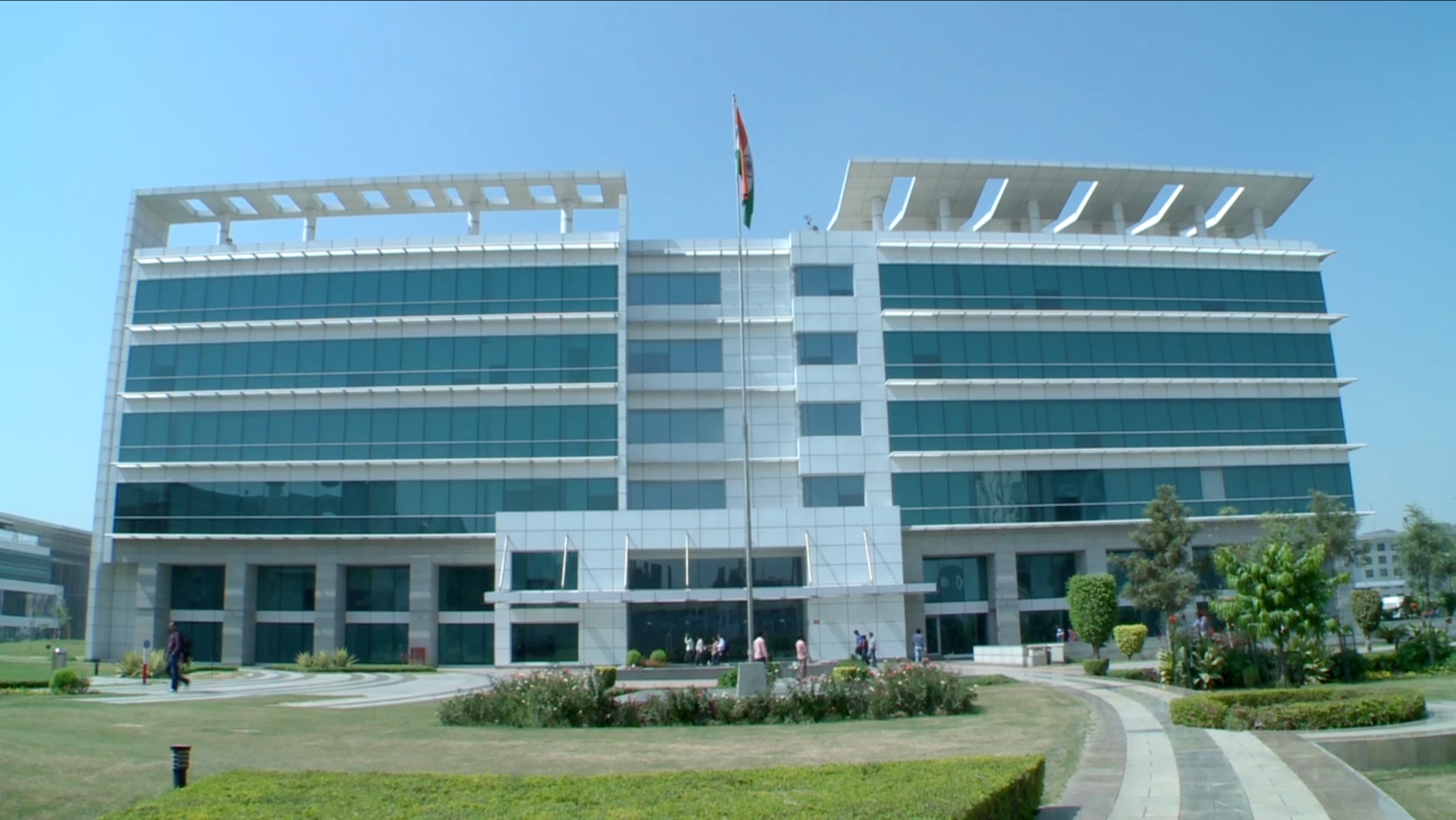
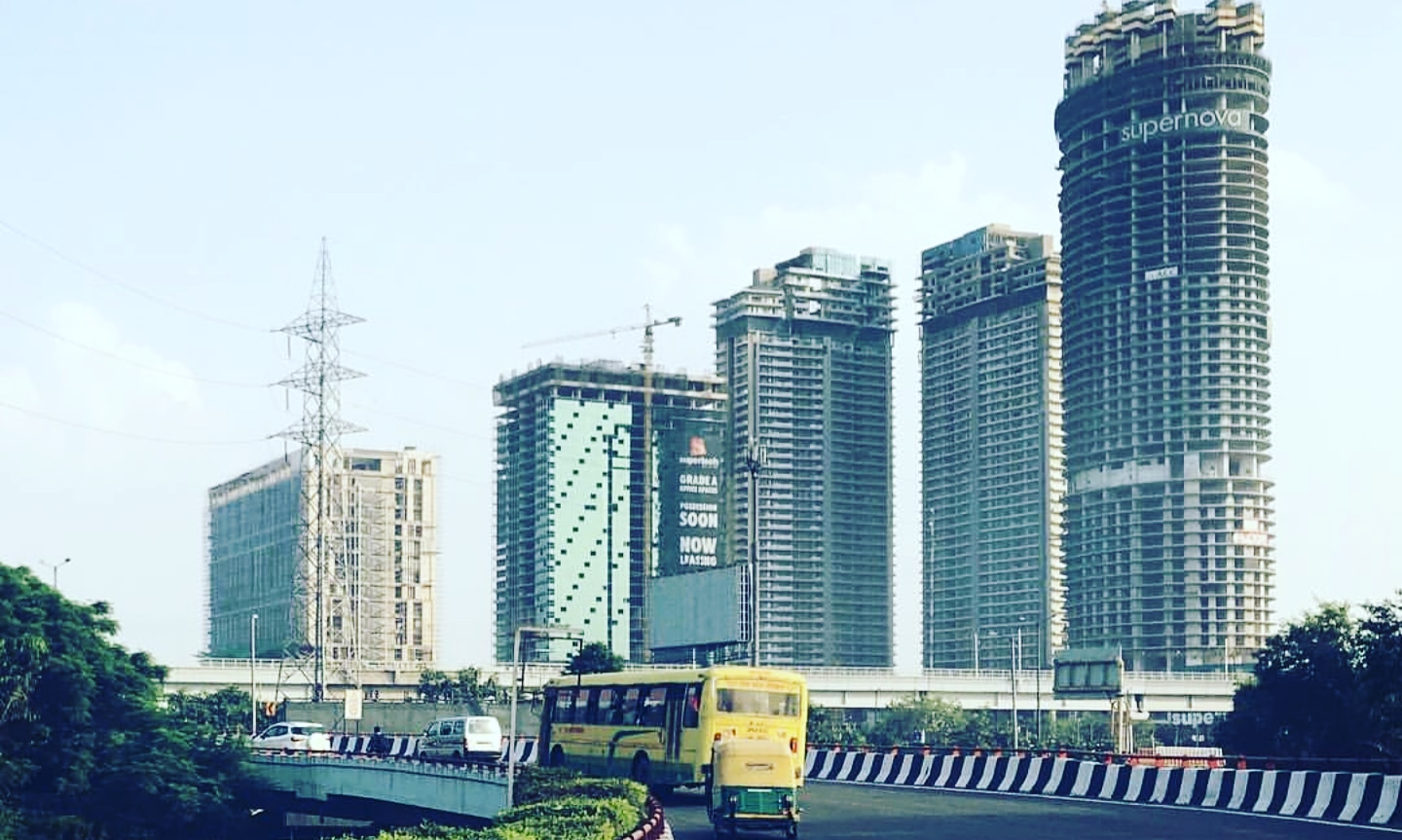
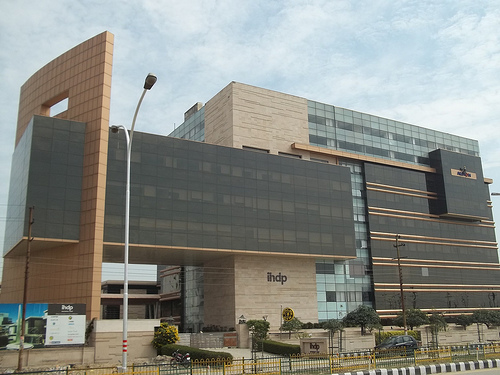
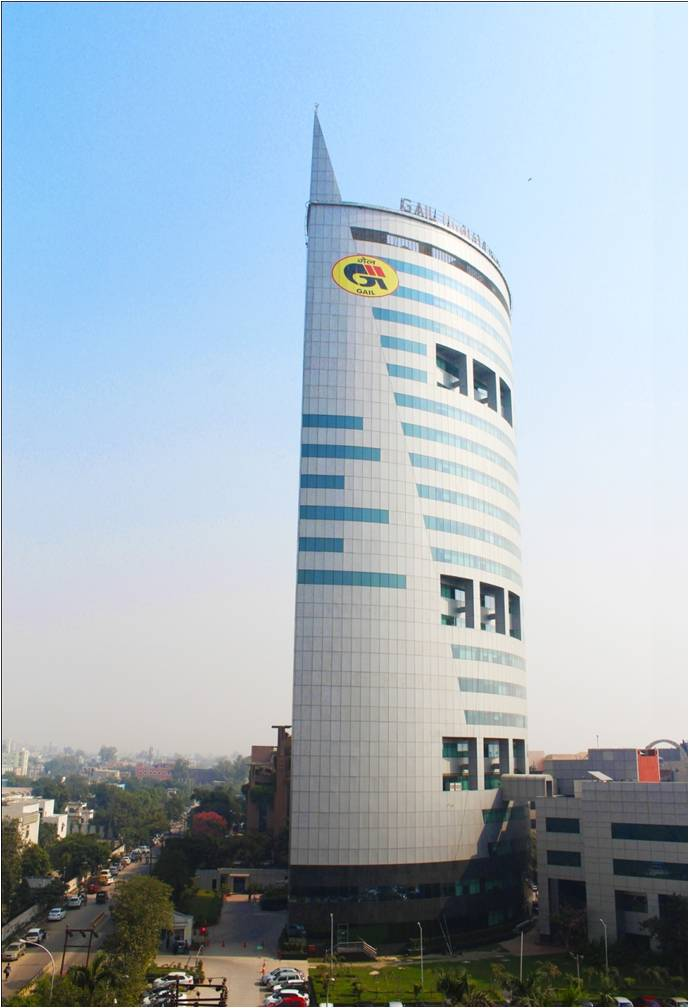
- Skyline of Noida Sector 50 HCLTech Headquarters Supernova Spira Sector 62 Skyline of 75 with Spectrum Mall GAIL Jubilee Tower

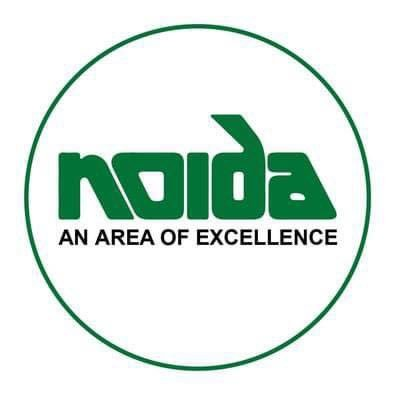
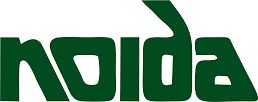
- Seal Brandmark

- Location of Noida in Uttar Pradesh, India
- Coordinates: 28.57°N 77.32°E
- Country: India
- State: Uttar Pradesh
- Division: Meerut
- District: Gautam Buddha Nagar
- Established: 17 April 1976
- Named for: New Okhla Industrial Development Authority

Government
  - Type: Industrial-Development Authority
  - Body: Noida Authority
  - Chairman, Noida Authority: Deepak Kumar (IAS)
  - CEO, Noida Authority: Krishna Karunesh (IAS)
  - Commissioner, Meerut Division: Selva Kumari J.
  - District Magistrate and Collector: Medha Roopam (IAS)
  - Commissioner of Police: Laxmi Singh (IPS)

Area
  - Total: 203 km^{2} (78 sq mi)
- Elevation: 200 m (660 ft)

Population (2011)
  - Total: 637,272
  - Rank: 71st
  - Density: 2,463/km^{2} (6,380/sq mi)
- Demonym: Noidite /Noidawallah

Language
  - Official: Hindi
  - Additional official: English
  - Regional: Braj Bhasha; Khariboli
- Time zone: UTC+5:30 (IST)
- PIN: 201301 to 201307
- Telephone code: 0120
- Vehicle registration: UP-16
- Lok Sabha Constituency: Gautam Buddha Nagar
- Vidhan Sabha Constituencies: Noida , Dadri
- GDP (Gautam Buddha Nagar district): ₹2.63 trillion (2023-24) ~ USD 31.62 Billion
- GDP per capita (Noida): ₹8,48,000 (2024-25) ~ USD 9,000
- Rapid Transit: Noida Metro and Delhi Metro
- Website: www.noidaauthorityonline.in

Noida, short for New Okhla Industrial Development Authority, is a city located in Gautam Buddha Nagar district in the Indian state of Uttar Pradesh. It is a part of the National Capital Region (NCR). Situated in the floodplain region between the Yamuna and the Hindon rivers, the city was established in 1976, and is regarded as one of the most systematically planned cities in India. It was designed under the NCR planning strategy to decentralise growth from Delhi. The Gautam Buddha Nagar District, which includes the cities of Noida, Greater Noida and YEIDA City contributes, over 10% to the Uttar Pradesh GSDP, more than 2.5 times the state capital district of Lucknow, which contributes 4%. It is India’s 4th richest City by GDP per capita as per FY2024-25 behind only Rangareddy (Telangana), Gurugram (Haryana) and Bengaluru Urban (Karnataka).

Noida is frequently ranked as one of India's greenest cities, boasting over 50% green cover, including botanical gardens and biodiversity parks. The city emphasises sustainable development, green corridors, and high-quality landscaping. As per provisional reports of Census of India, the population of Noida in 2011 was 642,381. The city is managed and maintained by the New Okhla Industrial Development Authority (NOIDA). The district's administrative headquarters are in the nearby city of Greater Noida. The city is a part of the Noida (Vidhan Sabha) constituency and Gautam Buddha Nagar (Lok Sabha) constituency. Noida was ranked as the "Best City in Uttar Pradesh" in the "Best City Awards" conducted by ABP News in 2015. It is also ranked the cleanest city in medium category cities (cities with a population of 300,000 to 1,000,000) and 4th cleanest city among cities with less than 1,000,000 people.

Noida is a prominent IT hub of India, for several software development companies, such as Microsoft, Arm Holdings, HCL, Samsung and Barclays. The city has evolved into a prominent economic engine, owing to concentrations of information technology firms, electronics assembly, automotive production, logistics facilities and news broadcasting houses. As of August 2025, Noida accommodates approximately 11,000 industrial units. Noida is the leading mobile manufacturing hub in India, home to the Samsung, Xiaomi, Google Pixel, Vivo and OPPO, collectively responsible for over 60% of India's mobile production. A new planned city, Greater Noida extensions further expand capacity with new SEZs and tech parks.

== History ==
Noida came into administrative existence on 17 April 1976 and celebrates 17 April as "Noida Day". It was set up as part of an urbanisation thrust during the controversial Emergency period (1975–1977). The city was created under the UP Industrial Area Development Act, 1976 by the initiatives of Sanjay Gandhi. The city has the highest per capita income in Uttar Pradesh, ahead of Lucknow. Noida is classified as a special economic zone (SEZ). The Noida Authority is among the richest civic bodies in the country.

== Geography ==
Noida is located in the Gautam Buddh Nagar district of Uttar Pradesh state of India. Noida is about 19 kilometres (12 mi) southeast of New Delhi, 25 kilometres (16 mi) northwest of the district headquarters, Greater Noida, and 520 kilometres (323 mi) northwest of the state capital, Lucknow. It is bound on the west and southwest by the Yamuna River, on the north and northwest by the city of Delhi, on the northeast by the cities of Delhi and Ghaziabad on the north-east, east, and south-east by the Hindon River. Noida falls under the catchment area of the Yamuna River, and is located on the old riverbed. The soil is rich and loamy.

=== Climate ===
Noida features a hot semi arid climate (BSh) under the Köppen climate classification.

In summer (March to June), the weather remains hot and the temperature ranges from a maximum of 48 °C to a minimum of 30 °C.

Monsoon season prevails from late-June to mid-September.

The cold waves from the Himalayan region make the winters in Noida chilly and harsh. Temperatures can fall to as low as 2 °C at the peak of the winter season. Noida also has fog and smoke problems. In January, a dense fog envelops the city, reducing visibility on the streets.

Noida

Climate chart (precipitation, max. and min. temperature)
J	F	M	A	M	J	J	A	S	O	N	D
23 20 8	33 24 11	20 30 15	14 37 21	20 40 25	74 38 28	208 34 27	183 32 26	99 32 24	13 32 19	5 27 14	8 22 9
- █ Average max. and min. temperatures in °C
- █ Precipitation totals in mm
- Source: Climate Data
Imperial conversion
J	F	M	A	M	J	J	A	S	O	N	D
0.9 68 46	1.3 74 51	0.8 86 59	0.6 98 70	0.8 103 78	2.9 101 82	8.2 92 80	7.2 90 78	3.9 90 75	0.5 89 66	0.2 81 57	0.3 72 49
- █ Average max. and min. temperatures in °F
- █ Precipitation totals in inches

Climate data for Noida (1991-2021)
Month	Jan	Feb	Mar	Apr	May	Jun	Jul	Aug	Sep	Oct	Nov	Dec	Year
Mean daily maximum °C (°F)	20.1 (68.2)	23.6 (74.5)	29.8 (85.6)	36.7 (98.1)	39.5 (103.1)	39.2 (102.6)	35.2 (95.4)	34.3 (93.7)	34.1 (93.4)	31.6 (88.9)	27.3 (81.1)	22.2 (72.0)	31.1 (88.1)
Daily mean °C (°F)	13.5 (56.3)	16.9 (62.4)	22.5 (72.5)	29.1 (84.4)	32.7 (90.9)	32.9 (91.2)	29.9 (85.8)	28.7 (83.7)	27.7 (81.9)	25.2 (77.4)	20.4 (68.7)	15.3 (59.5)	24.6 (76.2)
Mean daily minimum °C (°F)	7.7 (45.9)	10.6 (51.1)	15.2 (59.4)	21.0 (69.8)	25.3 (77.5)	27.5 (81.5)	26.6 (79.9)	25.8 (78.4)	23.9 (75.0)	18.9 (66.0)	14.0 (57.2)	9.2 (48.6)	18.8 (65.9)
Average precipitation mm (inches)	23 (0.9)	33 (1.3)	20 (0.8)	14 (0.6)	20 (0.8)	74 (2.9)	208 (8.2)	183 (7.2)	99 (3.9)	13 (0.5)	5 (0.2)	8 (0.3)	700 (27.6)
Average rainy days	2	3	3	3	4	7	15	15	8	2	1	1	64
Average relative humidity (%)	68	62	48	29	32	47	72	78	73	58	55	62	51
Mean daily sunshine hours	8.2	9.4	10.6	11.5	12.1	11.8	9.5	9.0	9.3	10.1	9.6	8.8	10.0
Source: Climate Data

Noida has been ranked 6th best “National Clean Air City” under (Category 2 3-10L Population cities) in India.

== Demographics ==
According to voter data published by the Election Commission of India has constituency-level estimates for the GB Nagar Lok Sabha seat in Gautam Buddha Nagar district, community-wise population figures are often discussed during elections. Reports suggest that the Rajput community is estimated at around 4.5–5 lakh individuals thus making them single-largest voter group in Gautam Buddha Nagar (Noida). Other estimates indicate approximately 3–3.5 lakh Gujjars, around 2.5–3 lakh Brahmins, and nearly 4 lakh voters belonging to Scheduled Castes and Communities. The Muslim population in the constituency is believed to be close to 3.5 lakh, making them a significant part of the electoral landscape.

As per provisional data of 2011 census, Noida had a population of 637,272 out of which the male population was 349,397 and the female population was 287,875. The literacy rate was 88.58 per cent. Male literacy was 92.90% and female literacy was 83.28%. Scheduled Castes and Scheduled Tribes make up 6.67% and 0.29% of the population respectively.

Religions in Noida (2011)
Religion	Percent
Hinduism	86.86%
Islam	8.55%
Sikhism	1.11%
Christianity	0.86%
Jainism	0.54%
Other or not stated	2.08%
Distribution of religions

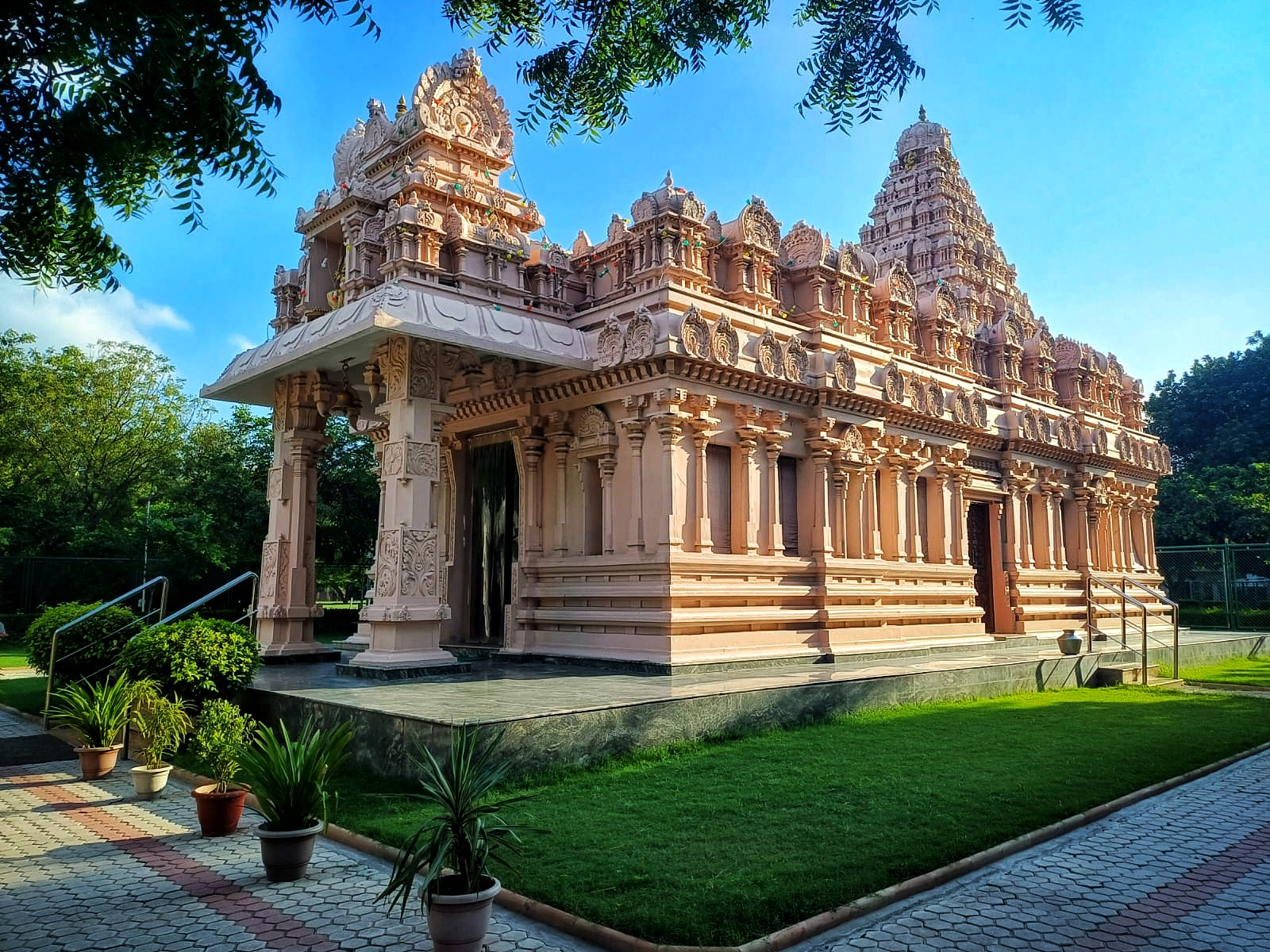
Shri Vinayaka Temple, a Hindu Temple in Noida

There are people of almost all major religions, but the majority practice Hinduism. Many famous Hindu temples are located in the city, some of the more famous ones are the Hanuman temple in Sector 22, the Kalibari Temple in Sector 26, the ISKCON temple in Sector 33, Shree Jagannath Temple in Sector 34, Sai Baba Temple in Sector 61, Shiv Mandir in Sector 31, Shri Ram Mandir in Sector 36 and the Kuti Temple at Sec 163 Mohiyapur. Locals believe that the birth of Ravana also took place on the outskirts of Noida in a village called Bishrakh (near Noida-Greater Noida border). A Shia Jama Masjid in Sector 50 and St. Gregorios Indian Orthodox Church in Sector 51, Mar Thoma Church in Sector 50, and St. Mary's Catholic Church in Sector 34 are also well known.

Languages in Noida (2011)
1. Hindi (85.8%)
2. Bengali (2.88%)
3. Bhojpuri (2.18%)
4. Punjabi (2.16%)
5. Maithili (1.14%)
6. Urdu (0.98%)
7. Others (4.84%)

Hindi is the most spoken language. Other languages such as Urdu and Punjabi, are spoken by a minority. There is a smattering of speakers of other languages due to Ghaziabad's position in the Delhi metro area.

== Government and politics ==
=== Administration ===
==== Water Management ====
Noida has been selected as a ‘water warrior’ city by the Jal Shakti Ministry for its wastewater reutilisation for irrigation purposes. Under Noida's jurisdiction, there are currently eight operational sewage treatment plants (STPs), with a combined capacity of 411 MLD.

==== Authority ====
The city's infrastructure is looked after by the NOIDA Authority, a statutory authority set-up under Uttar Pradesh Industrial Area Development Act, 1976. NOIDA Authority's head is its chairman, who is an IAS officer; the authority's daily matters, however, are looked after by its CEO, who is also an IAS officer. NOIDA Authority comes under the Infrastructure and Industrial Development Department of Uttar Pradesh Government. The present Chairman of NOIDA Authority is Deepak Kumar (IAS) and CEO is Krishna Karunesh (IAS).

==== General administration ====
The Gautam Budh Nagar district is a part of Meerut division, headed by the Divisional Commissioner, who is an IAS officer of high seniority. The Commissioner is the head of local government institutions (including Municipal Corporations) in the division, is in-charge of infrastructure development in his division, and is also responsible for maintaining law and order in the division. The District Magistrate, hence, reports to the Divisional Commissioner of Meerut. The current Divisional Commissioner of Meerut is Smt. Selva Kumari J. (IAS).

Gautam Budh Nagar district administration is headed by the District Magistrate (DM) of Gautam Budh Nagar, who is an IAS officer. The DM is in charge of property records and revenue collection for the central government and oversee the national elections held in the city.

The district magistrate is assisted by one chief development officer, three additional district magistrates (ADM) (Executive, Finance & Revenue and Law & Order), and one city magistrate. The district has divided into three Subdivisions named Noida Sadar, Dadri, and Jewar each headed by a sub-divisional magistrate (SDM) who reports to the district magistrate. The current DM of Gautam Buddha Nagar (Noida) since is Medha Roopam (IAS).

==== Law enforcement ====
In January 2020, the government of Uttar Pradesh, led by CM Yogi Adityanath announced that Gautam Buddha Nagar (Noida) and Lucknow will have a Commissionerate Police system, headed by a Commissioner of Police who shall directly report to the DGP of Uttar Pradesh Police. The Commissioner of Police (Additional DGP rank) is assisted by two Additional Commissioner of Police (Deputy IGP rank). Below them, there are seven Deputy Commissioner of Police/DCP (SP rank).

Noida is divided into three police zones i.e. Noida, Central Noida and Greater Noida, each of them under a zonal DCP (SP rank). Apart from these three zonal DCPs, Noida Police has four other DCP looking after Headquarters, Traffic, Crime, and Women Safety. Below them, there are 16 Assistant Commissioner of Police/ACP (Deputy SP rank). The current Commissioner of Noida Police is Laxmi Singh, an Indian Police Service (IPS) officer.

==== Courts ====
The Court for Noida is situated at District Court Complex, Surajpur Greater Noida, Gautam Budh Nagar formed in 2012 with 18 courts in function. The court complex at Surajpur Greater Noida is built on more than 30 acres of land. The infrastructure of the Court is neat and clean with good size courtrooms.

==== Constituencies ====
Noida (Assembly constituency) represents the area. The incumbent Member of the Legislative Assembly in the Noida (assembly constituency) is Pankaj Singh of the Bharatiya Janata Party (BJP). The city falls under the Gautam Buddha Nagar parliamentary constituency, and the incumbent Member of Parliament is Mahesh Sharma.

=== Residential sectors and villages ===
Noida is home to a large number of residential sectors and villages. As of 2021, the city has a total of 168 residential sectors that offer a range of housing options to its residents.

Geographical area	1,442 km^{2} (557 sq mi)
Population	1,105,290; 600,950(M), 504,340 (F)
Literate	627,930; 402,230(M), 225,700 (F)
Tehsils	3
Development blocks	4
Nyay panchayat	38
Gram sabha	243
Inhabited village	343
Inhabited village	30
Towns	8
Source	http://gbnagar.nic.in/

=== Utilities ===
==== Infrastructure ====
Noida ranks one of the cleanest medium population cities when it comes to cleanliness among cities in India. The creation of associated physical infrastructure is higher in Noida and Greater Noida. Most of the land in Noida is not very fertile and the agricultural output is low. It is in the flood plains of the Yamuna River on one side and the Hindon River on the other. Many villages are visible from the Noida Expressway, beginning from the Mahamaya flyover to Greater Noida on both sides. One end of the Taj expressway terminates on Noida Expressway near the Hindon River and the other at Agra. Up until the 1980s, these villages were flooded every two–three years, resulting in people temporarily moving to other places in Noida, and even as far as Mehrauli in South Delhi. Noida is also famous for its tall buildings and comes 2nd in India after Mumbai in this parameter.

The new Parthala Flyover in Noida, which is often compared to the iconic Signature Bridge, is a major infrastructure improvement for the region. The flyover spans across the busy Parthala Chowk intersection, providing a faster and more efficient route for commuters. With its sleek and modern design, the Parthala Flyover has quickly become a landmark in the area and has drawn comparisons to the Signature Bridge in Delhi. While it may not have the same scale or grandeur as the Signature Bridge, the Parthala Flyover is a significant development that has greatly improved the flow of traffic in Noida and reduced travel time for commuters.

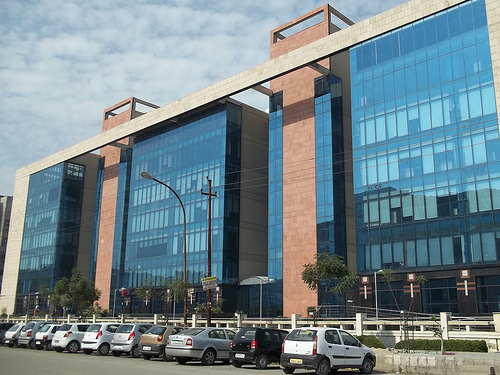
Noida is home to many IT Parks

There is always a huge amount of revenue surplus each year as they are unable to spend the entire amount on development or on maintaining civic amenities. Lease rent and interest from builders are the biggest contributors to Noida's revenue. Besides, the authority gets huge revenues out of water and property transfer charges. "The Noida authority had deposited ₹3,500 crore as fixed deposits in various banks because of surplus funds. Noida has so much surplus funds with it that it can run the city even if it does not take any taxes from its allottees for 5 years in a row."

A 300 m (980 ft) tall skyscraper named "Supernova Spira" stands on the Noida side of Delhi Noida Border. It was supposed to be the tallest residential tower in northern India after its completion by 2021. The Noida Authority's plans to establish 'New Noida' have opened new opportunities in the Dadri-Noida-Ghaziabad Investment Region (DNGIR). The region will be settled in four phases, according to the Master Plan 2041 submitted recently to the Authority. New Noida will include a land bank consisting of 87 villages of Bulandshahr and Dadri.

In 2014, Allahabad High Court ordered demolition of twin towers and pulled up Noida Authority for collusion with developer. Construction work stopped at the site in 2014 but the twin towers in Noida, built illegally by realty firm Supertech Ltd., were brought down within 12 seconds on 28 August 2022 with more than 3,700 kg of explosives.

==== Hospitals ====
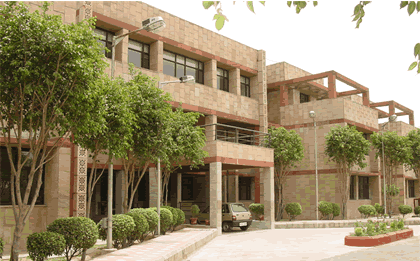
National Institute of Cancer Prevention and Research in Noida

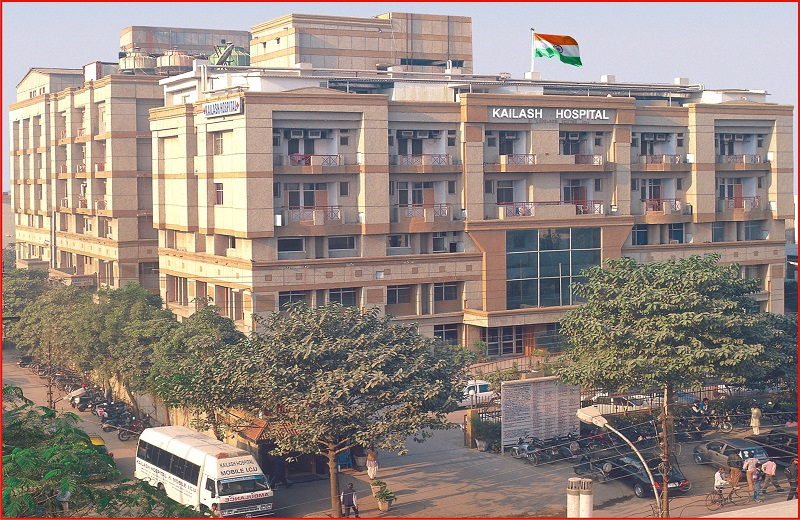
Kailash Hospital Noida

There are many private speciality hospitals in Noida, including:

- Kailash Hospitals
- Metro Hospitals
- Fortis Hospital
- Max Super Speciality Hospital
- Felix Hospital
- Yatharth Hospitals

== Economy ==
In the last few years, Noida has also become a hub for software and mobile app development companies like Microsoft, Arm Holdings, HCL, Samsung and Barclays. These companies are contributing to the city's economy with their software product development and service export in foreign currencies. Samsung recently invested ₹50 billion (equivalent to ₹73 billion or US$780 million in 2026) in Noida, under the Make in India initiative.

Paytm, India's largest unicorn fintech company is also headquartered in Noida.

SkyMarkOne building in Noida

== Cityscape ==
=== Parks and recreation ===
==== Okhla Bird Sanctuary ====
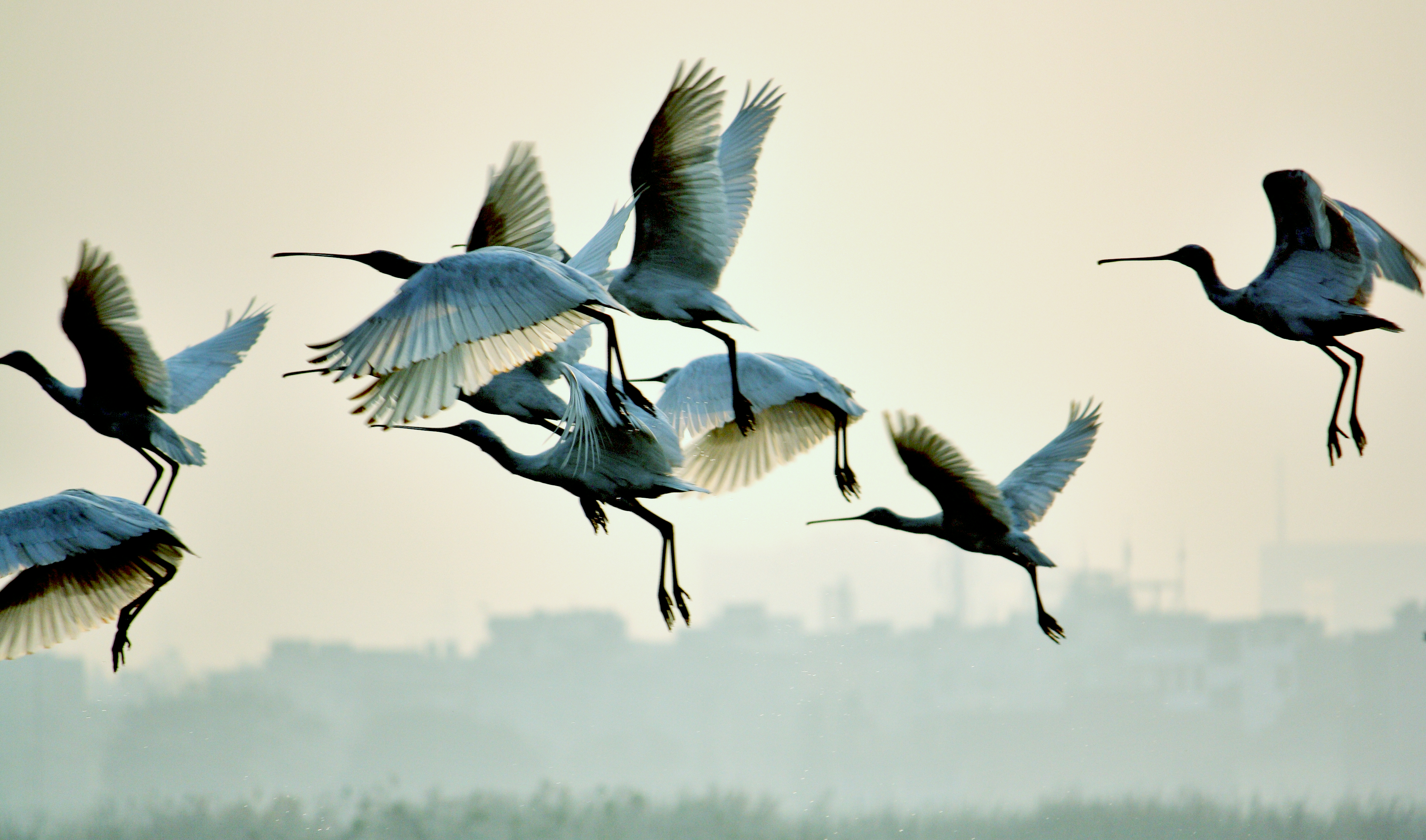
Spoonbills at Okhla Bird Sanctuary

Okhla Bird Sanctuary (OBS) is at the entrance of the city at the point where the Yamuna river enters the state of Uttar Pradesh from the state of Delhi. The Okhla Barrage over the Yamuna has created the unique position of the OBS which attracts various species of birds. OBS is among the 466 important bird areas in India. About 324 various bird species are seen in the sanctuary, about 50% of which are migratory birds.

==== Noida Botanical Garden ====
Noida's botanical garden was formed in 2002 with the aim to turn it into a hub of special and endangered plants, representing the entire country. It is located in Sector 38A of the city. Today, it sprawls across 160 acres, There are around 7,500 plants in the garden. The garden has a seed bank, where seeds of more than 250 plant species are conserved. It also features a map of India, made entirely from plants.

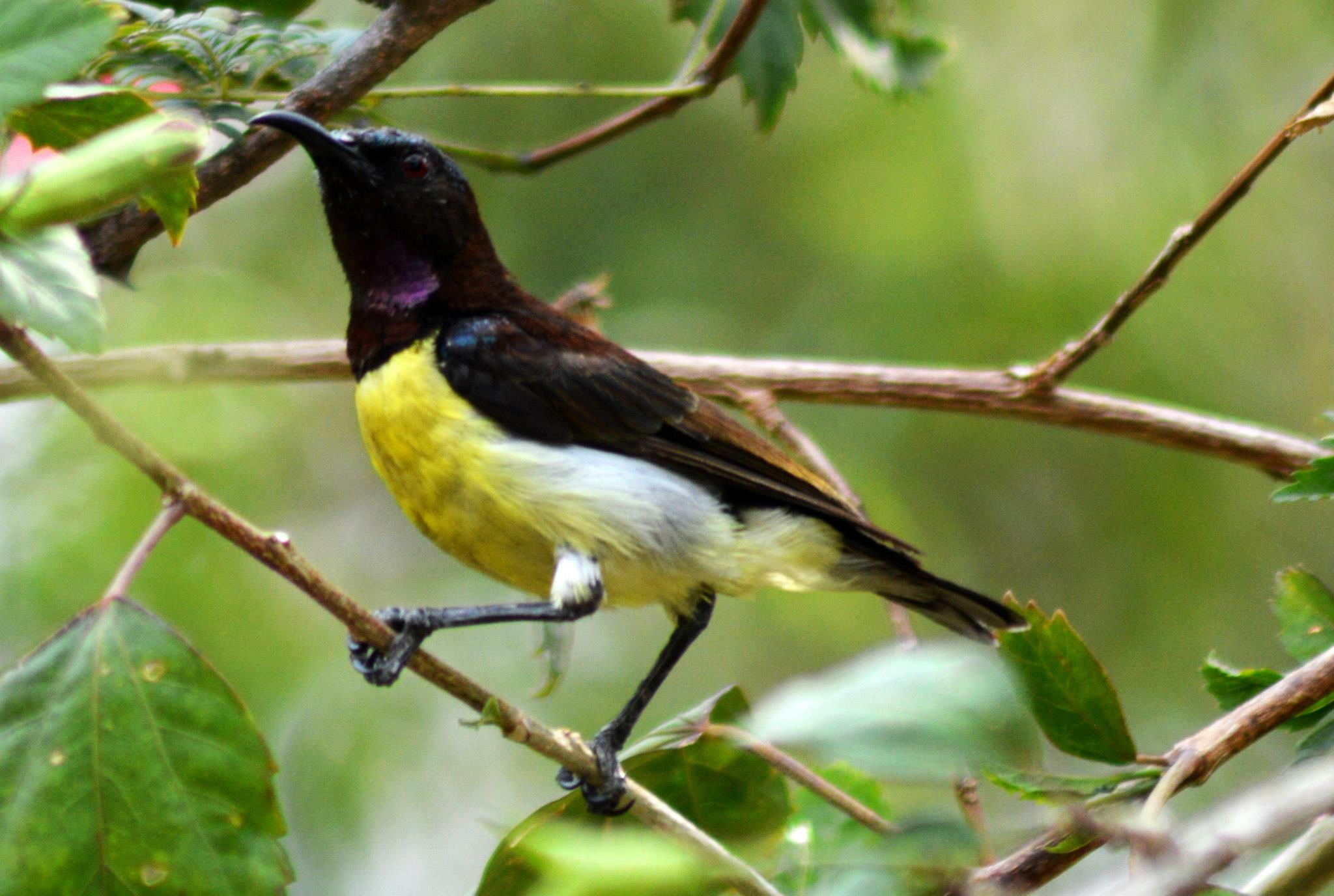
A purple-rumped sunbird at OBS

Scientists are giving a new lease of life to endangered and extinct plant species at the Botanical Garden. A look around the green expanse reveals species like Psilotum nudum, better known as skeleton fork fern. Considered a "primitive" plant – a descendant of possibly the first group of vascular plants from 400 million years ago – that was widespread during the Devonian and Silurian periods – its name means "bare naked" in Latin as it lacks most of the organs found in plants species that evolved later.

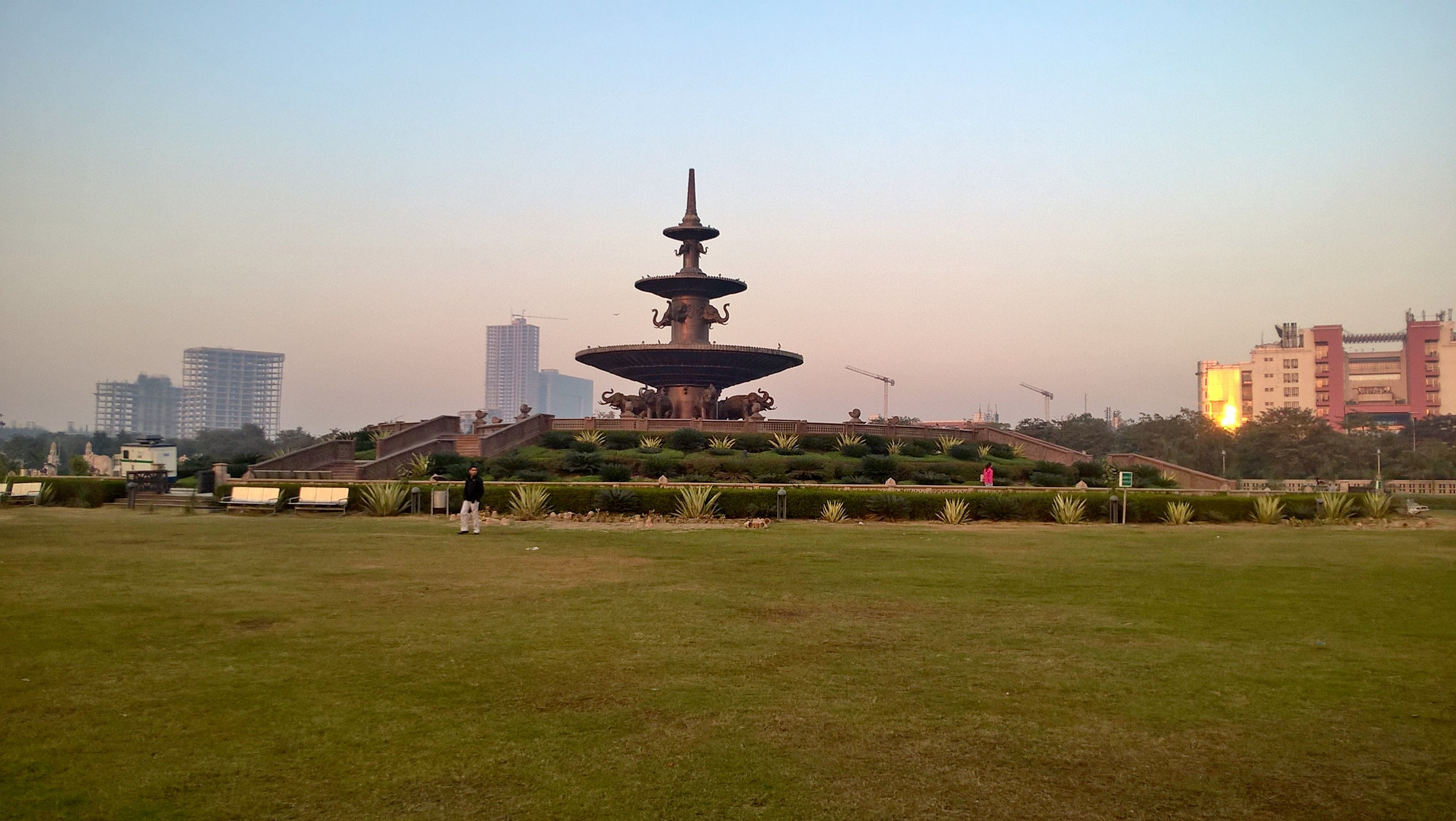
National Dalit Memorial Park in Noida

Noida's botanical garden is divided into 10 sections. The "medicinal plants" section has an astounding variety of 96 plants and is further divided into eight sections named after the parts of the human body they benefit. For example, the "digestive system" section has aloe vera and Gymnema sylvestre (madhunaashini), which treats diabetes.

The "blood and circulation" section has Withania somnifera (Ashwagandha) and Aristolochia indica (Isharmul) – blood purifiers. The "musculo-skeletal" section has Cissus quadrangularis (Hadjod); "skin disease" section has Plumbago zeylanica (Chitarak) which cures leucoderma.

Noida's botanical garden has a large fruit section which has many varieties of mango, pomegranate, lemon, pear, plum, mulberry, etc., besides their speciality the black guava. The woodland section is equally impressive with trees like Sapindus ]marginatus (Reetha), Pterocarpus marsupium (Sandalwood), Dalbergia sissoo (Sheesham wood), and Tectona Grandis (Teakwood).

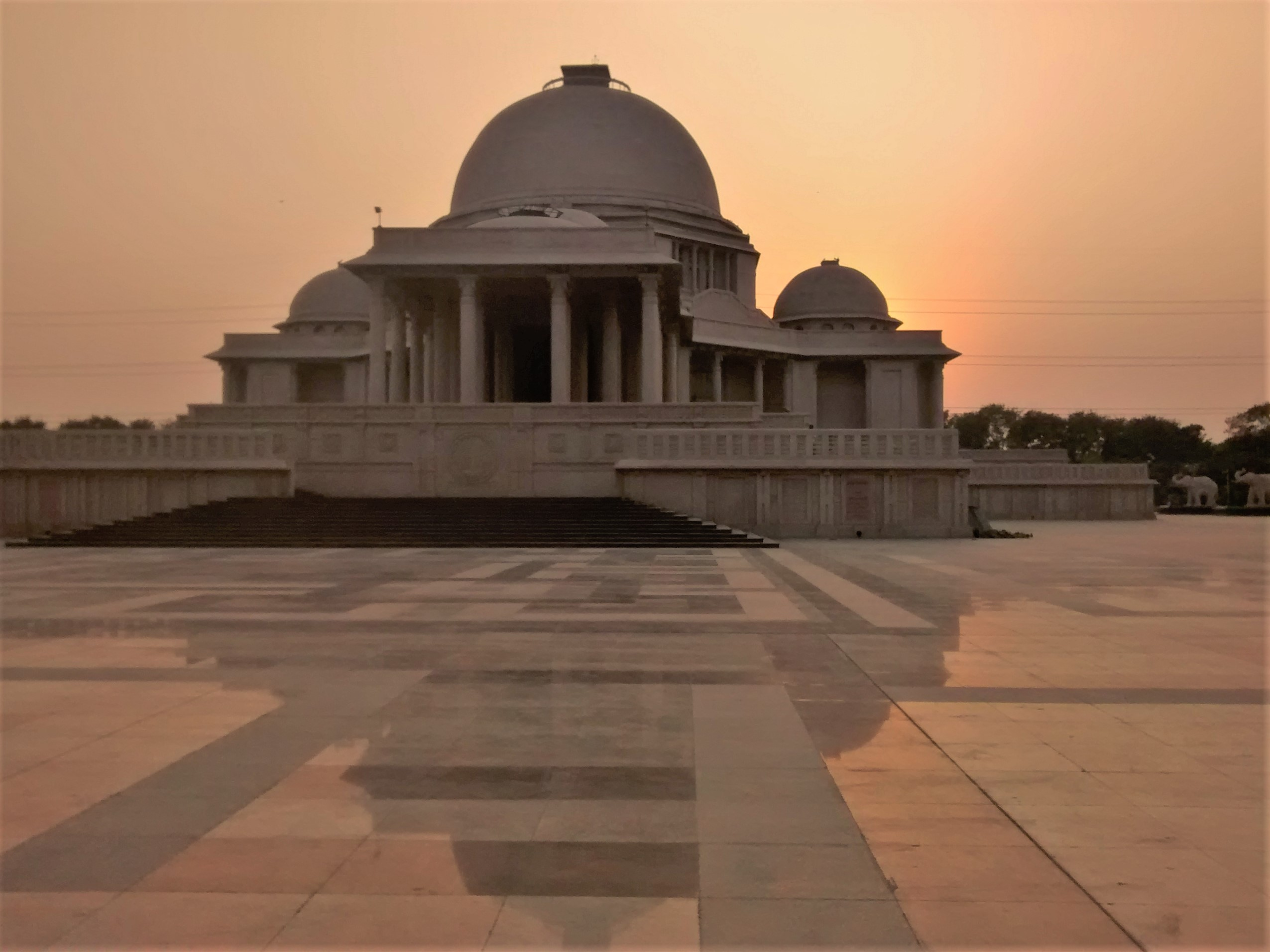
National Dalit Memorial, Noida

The garden also has a lotus pond featuring five different coloured water lilies.

==== Noida Dog Park ====
The Noida Dog Park is a 3.85 acres park dedicated to dogs where pet owners can visit with their pets. The park allows dogs to get off-leash exercise and social activity. There are shelters for many stray dogs in the park. The Noida Authority is planning to hire an agency to run a dog-food canteen and a vet clinic. Pet trainers will be provided.

== Transport ==
=== Metro ===
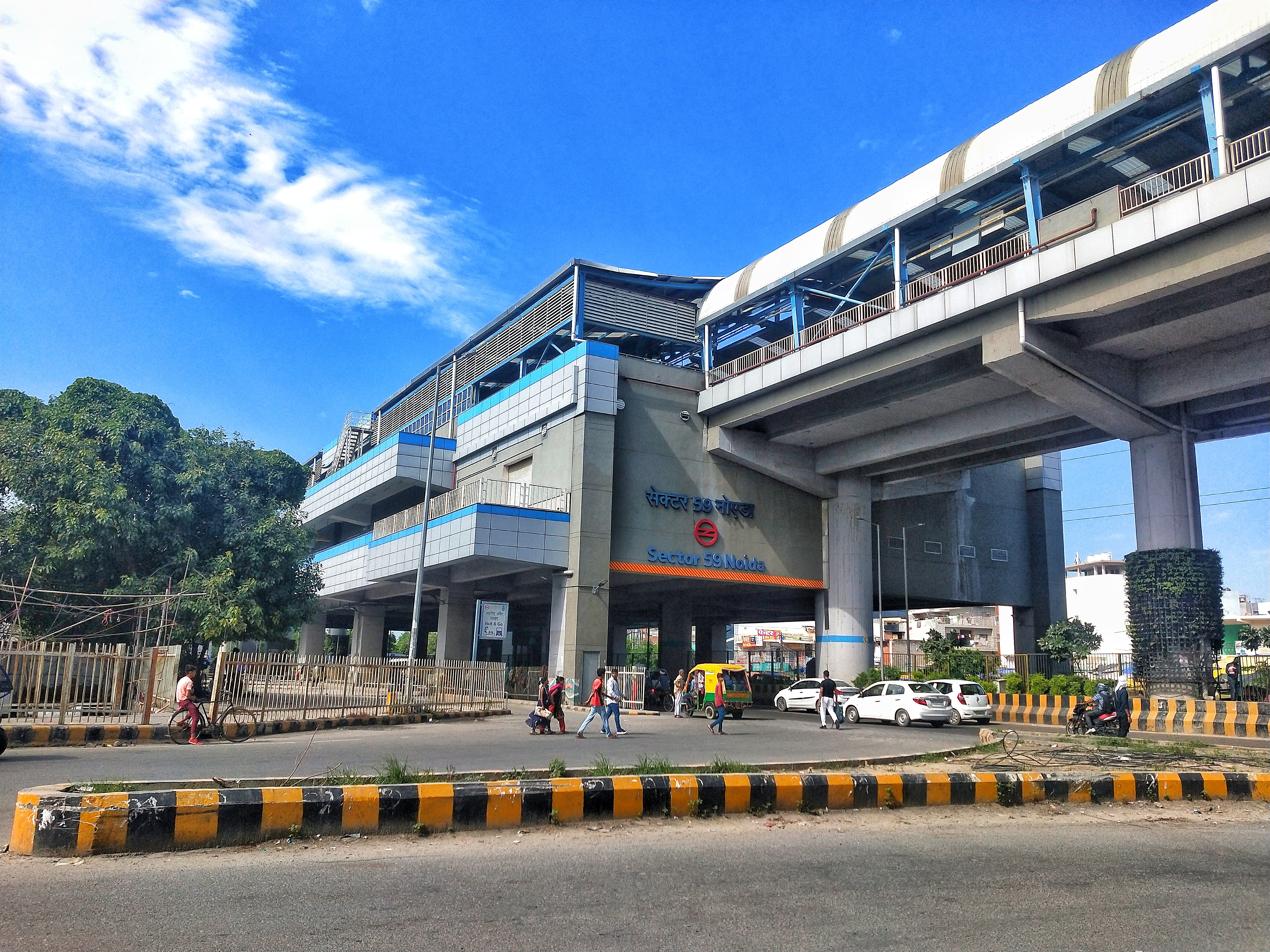
Sector 59 Metro Station

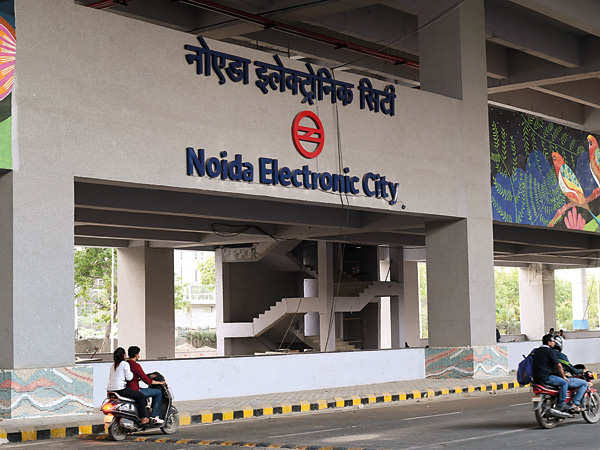
Noida Electronic City Metro Station

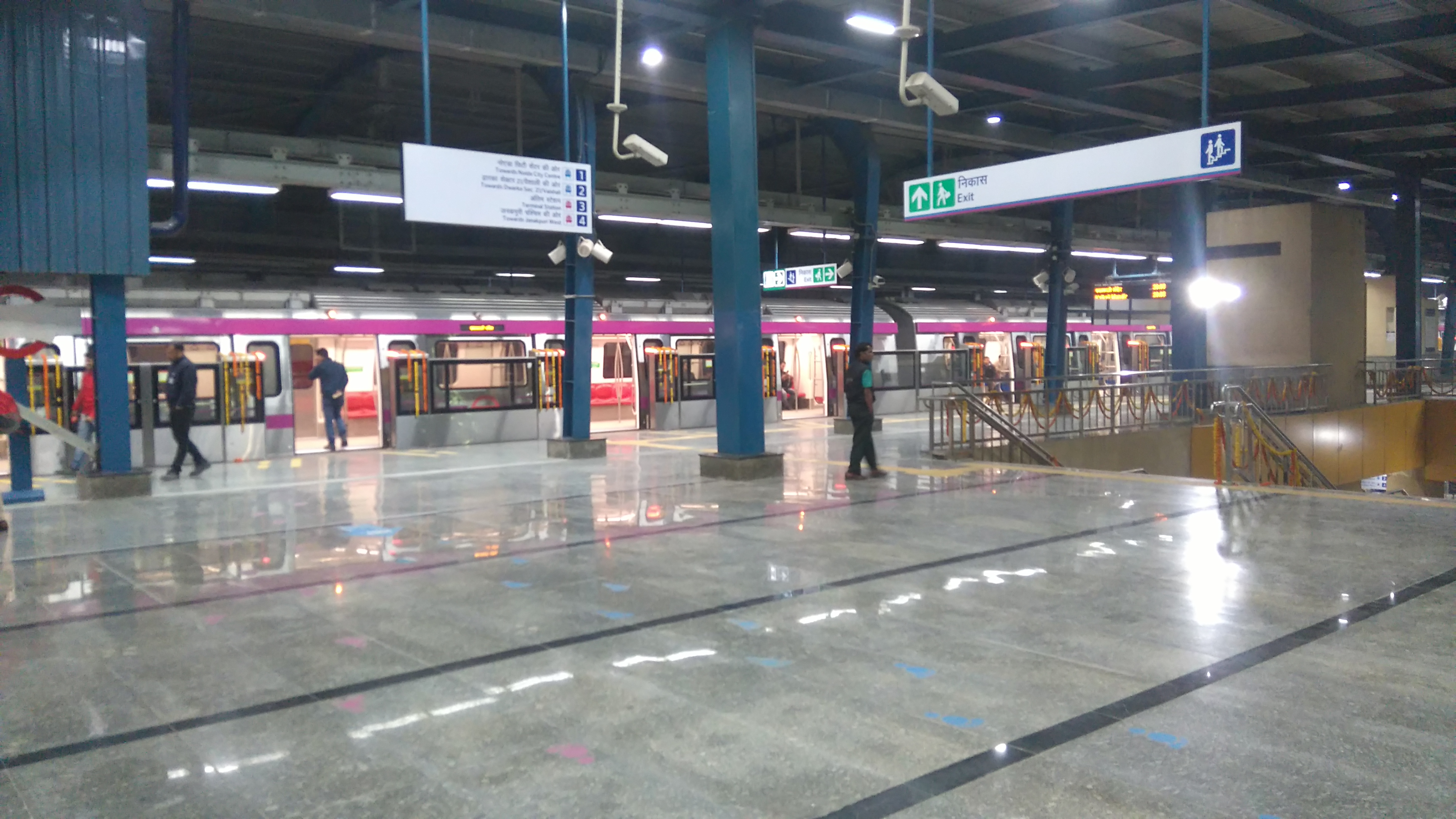
Botanical Garden metro station of the Magenta Line of the Delhi Metro in Noida.

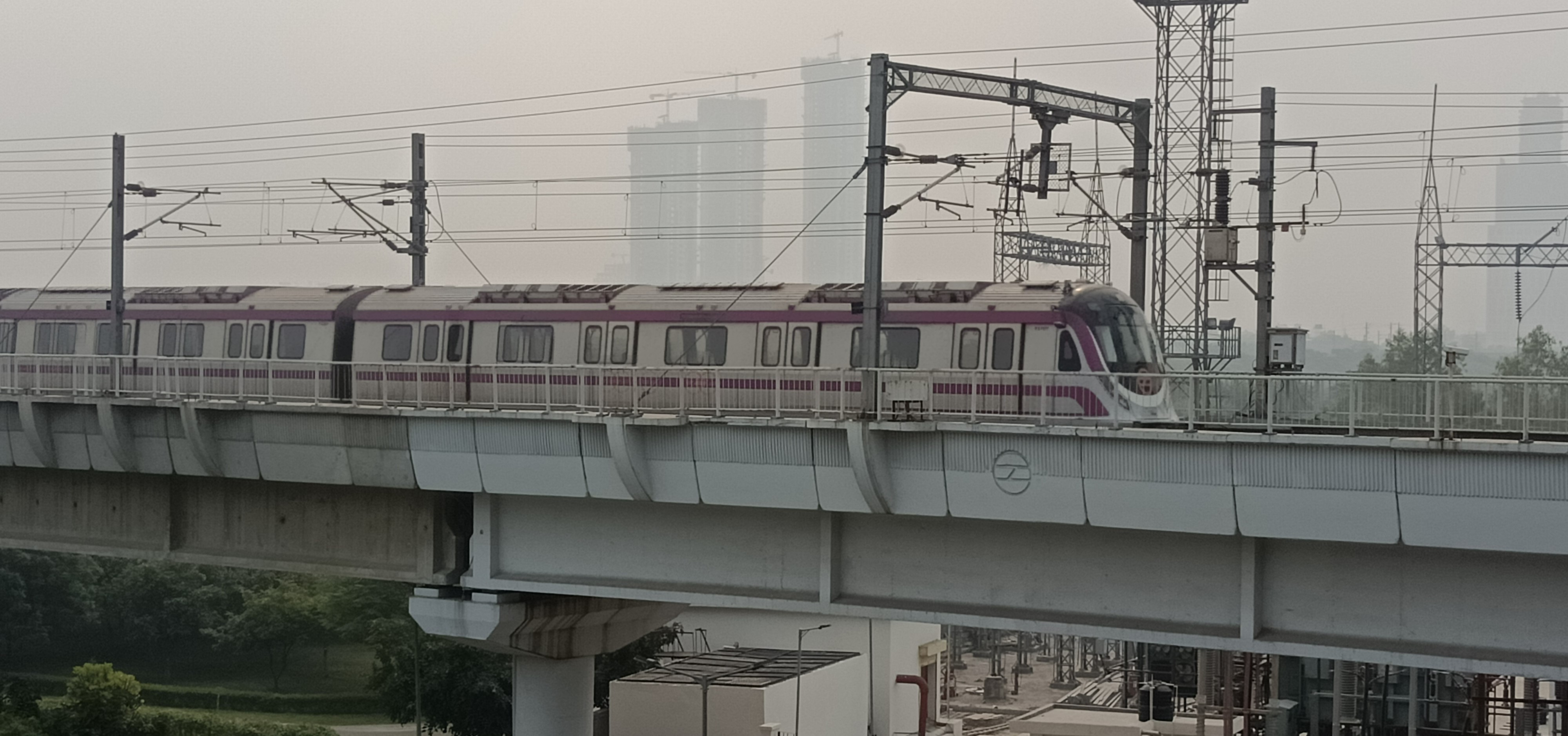
A Magenta Line metro train in Noida

Noida is connected by rail by the Noida Metro and Delhi Metro.

- The Noida Metro is a rapid transit system connecting the twin cities of Noida and Greater Noida in Gautam Buddh Nagar district of Uttar Pradesh, India. The metro network consists of one line (called Aqua Line), with a total length of 29.7 kilometres (18.5 mi) serving 21 stations. A second line is planned.
- The Delhi Metro officially ran in Noida on 12 November 2009. It now connects Connaught Place and Dwarka sub-city, via the Blue Line. The same Blue Line connects Noida with Vaishali through the Yamuna Bank interchange station.
- Delhi Metro's Magenta Line connects Noida and Janakpuri via Botanical Garden and Janakpuri West metro stations.

Noida is not directly connected via high-speed rail, but there are railway stations nearby reachable by road, including Ghaziabad railway station and Anand Vihar Terminal. However, the New Delhi Railway Station and Old Delhi Railway station, which are both accessible via metro, are the main railway stations most often used by commuters to reach Noida.

=== Road ===
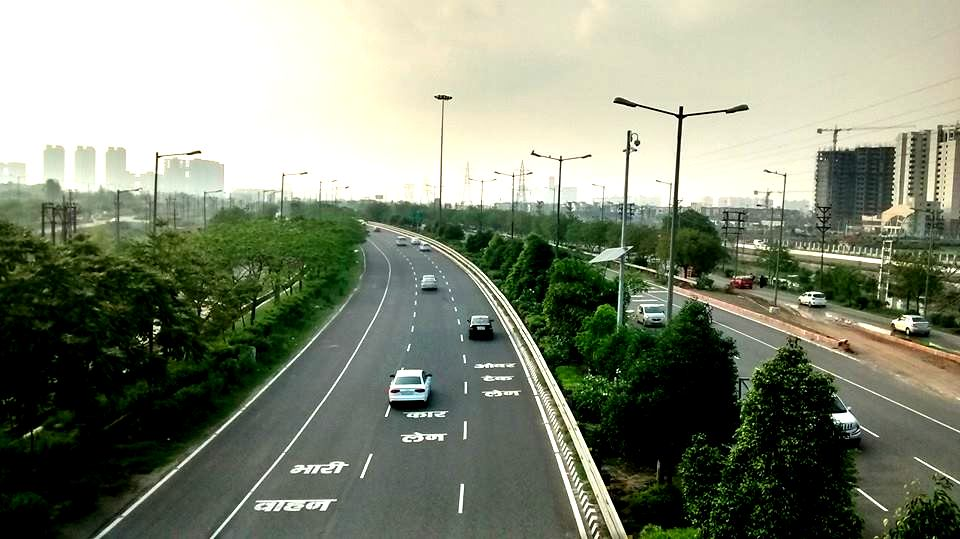
The Noida-Greater Noida Expressway.

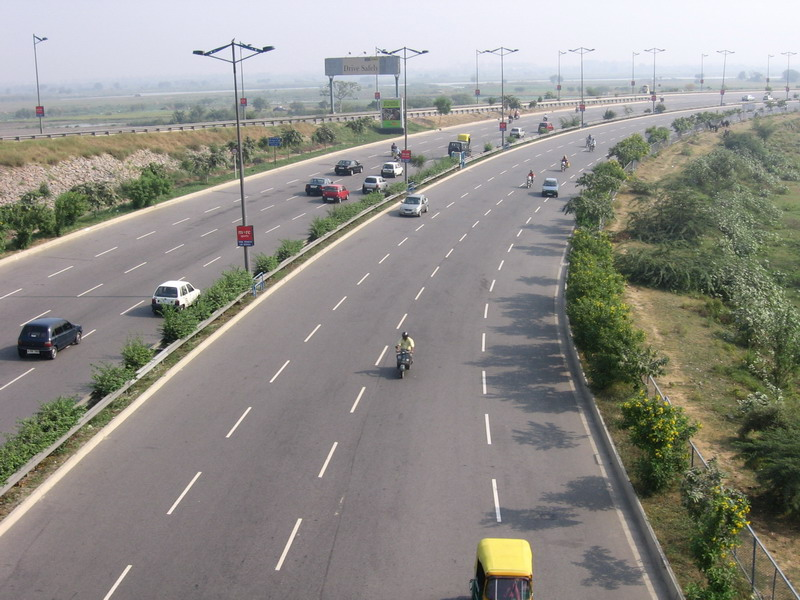
The DND Flyway connects Noida to Delhi.

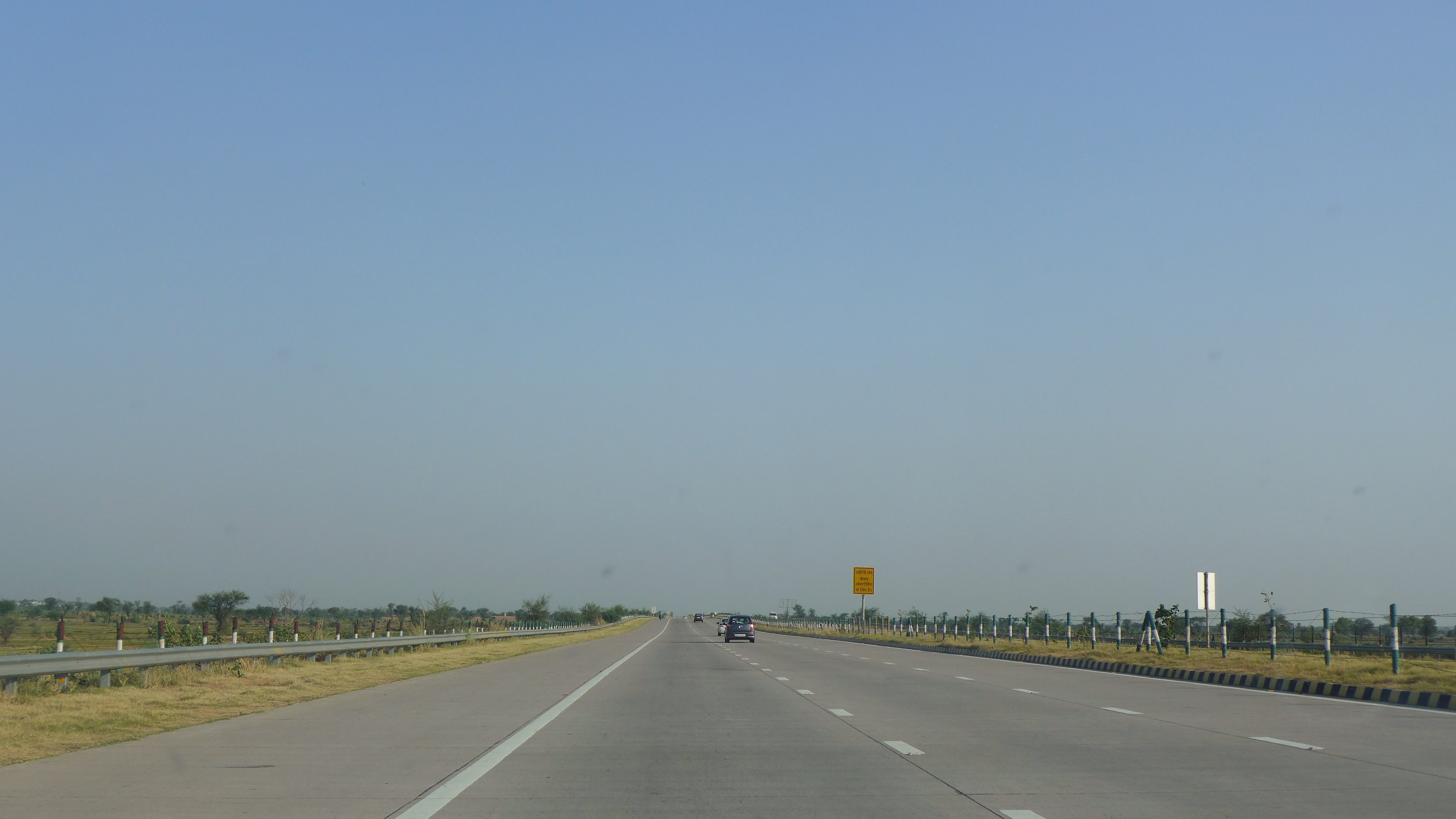
The Yamuna Expressway runs through Noida

Noida has roads laid mostly in a grid pattern, and all main roads are 6 lanes wide. Noida features three main expressways. One is the DND Flyway, which connects Noida and Delhi, and runs across the river Yamuna. The second is the Noida–Greater Noida Expressway, which connects Noida to Greater Noida. The area adjacent to the NGN Expressway has seen heavy residential development in recent years. The third is the Yamuna Expressway which connects Greater Noida to Agra via Mathura. The Eastern Peripheral Expressway, Delhi–Meerut Expressway, Upper Ganges Canal Expressway and the Ganga Expressway are the four expressways that are currently under construction which will be passing through the city.

A 4/6-lane double-decker elevated road is over the MP-II which takes only 5 minutes to cross the whole city. This 4.8 km (3.0 mi) road starts from Flex crossing and ends at Vishwa Bharti school. Another elevated road from sector 12/22 to sector 12/10-21/21A crossing is going to be built on the MP-I road. Three more elevated roads are planned. Along with these five elevated roads, several underpasses are under construction or approval and all these projects could be completed by 2020. Noida will become the city with the highest number of elevated roads and underpasses in India.

UPSRTC, DTC and private buses ply through some routes in the city. Taxi, auto-rickshaws, and cycle rickshaws are available for short-distance transport. Some services allow vehicle owners to hire a professional driver to drive their own cars for local or intercity journeys.

The Noida-Greater Noida Expressway has become a self-sustaining urban pocket in Noida. This 24.5 km (15.2 mi) long corridor has attracted real estate Noida Extension investors and buyers with its infrastructure facilities and connectivity to the other regions of NCR.

This area has emerged as a major growth corridor. Sectors abutting this corridor are 44, 45, 92–94, 96–100, 105, 108, 125–137 and 141–168. These sectors lie towards the south and south-east of Noida.

As of December 2021, a new Faridabad-Noida-Ghaziabad (FNG) expressway is also under construction to connect Faridabad and Ghaziabad directly with Noida.

=== Air ===
The nearest airport to Noida is the Indira Gandhi International Airport in Delhi.

In June 2017, the Union Government sanctioned the construction of an international airport in Jewar, officially named the Noida International Airport, to reduce the traffic of the one in New Delhi. The groundbreaking for the airport in Jewar was done on 25 November 2021. The first flight validation test of IndiGo's A320neo aircraft was successfully conducted on 9 December 2024, marking the airport's operational readiness. The Noida International Airport is slated to be operational by April 2026 after multiple delays.

The Noida International Airport (Jewar Airport) will be India's largest airport by area upon completion of all phases and is slated to start partial operations by mid-2026. It is designed as a multi-runway hub and will be a game-changer for NCR's connectivity and economy.

=== Bus ===
Noida has a bus stand at Morna village in Sector 35. There are regular buses to nearby cities like New Delhi, Dehradun, Ghaziabad, Tappal, Khair, Aligarh, Hathras, Bulandshahr, Meerut, Muzaffarnagar, Haridwar and others. Uttar Pradesh Parivahan runs local buses in the city. However, there are plans to shift the bus stand from Morna.

== Education ==
=== Colleges and universities ===
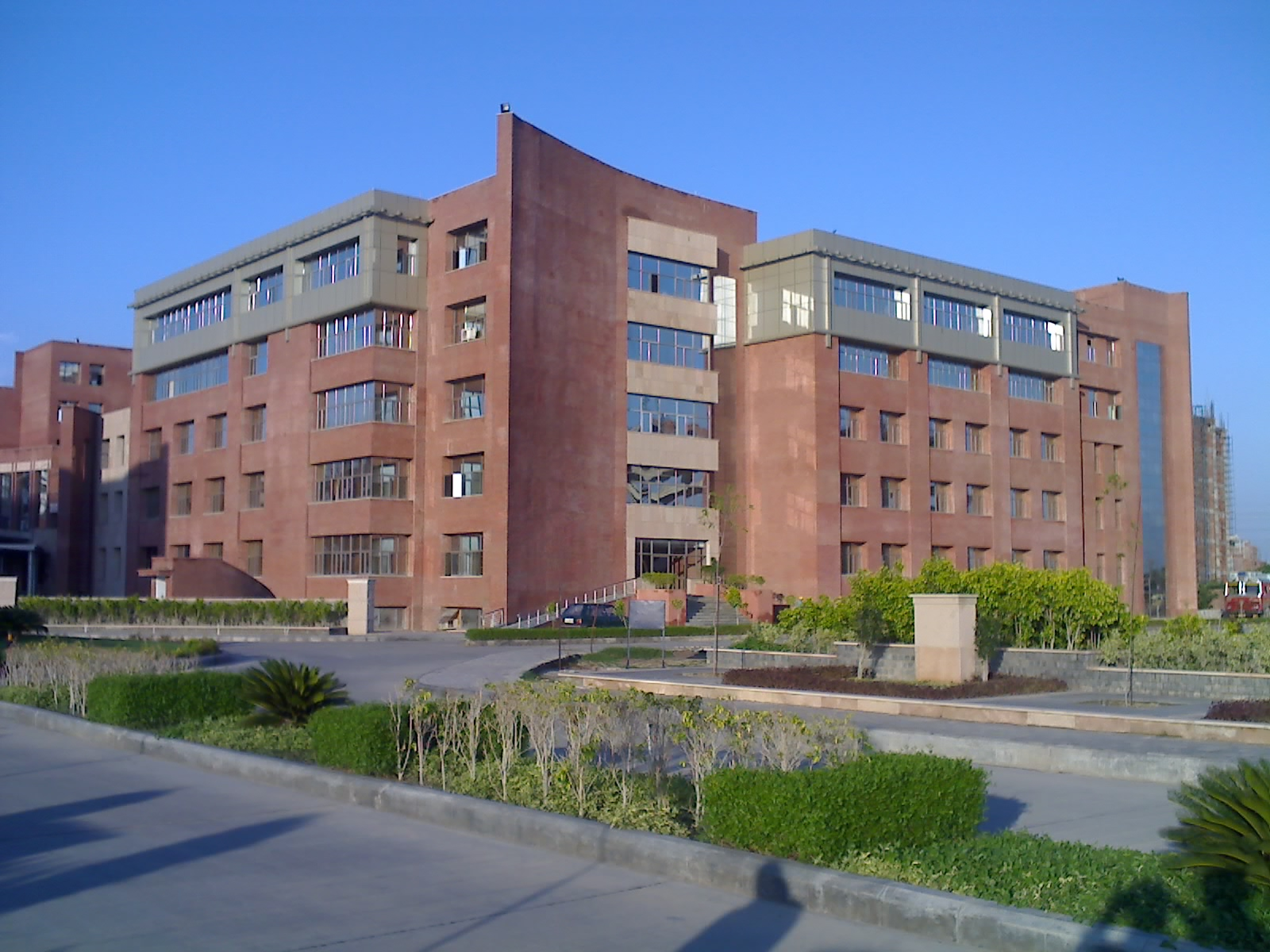
Campus of Amity University in Noida

Noida is the location of Dr. A.P.J. Abdul Kalam Technical University and various colleges affiliated with it. Noida is also the home to other institutions, including:

- Amity University Uttar Pradesh
- IMS Law College
- Jaypee Institute of Information Technology
- JSS Academy of Technical Education

=== Schools ===
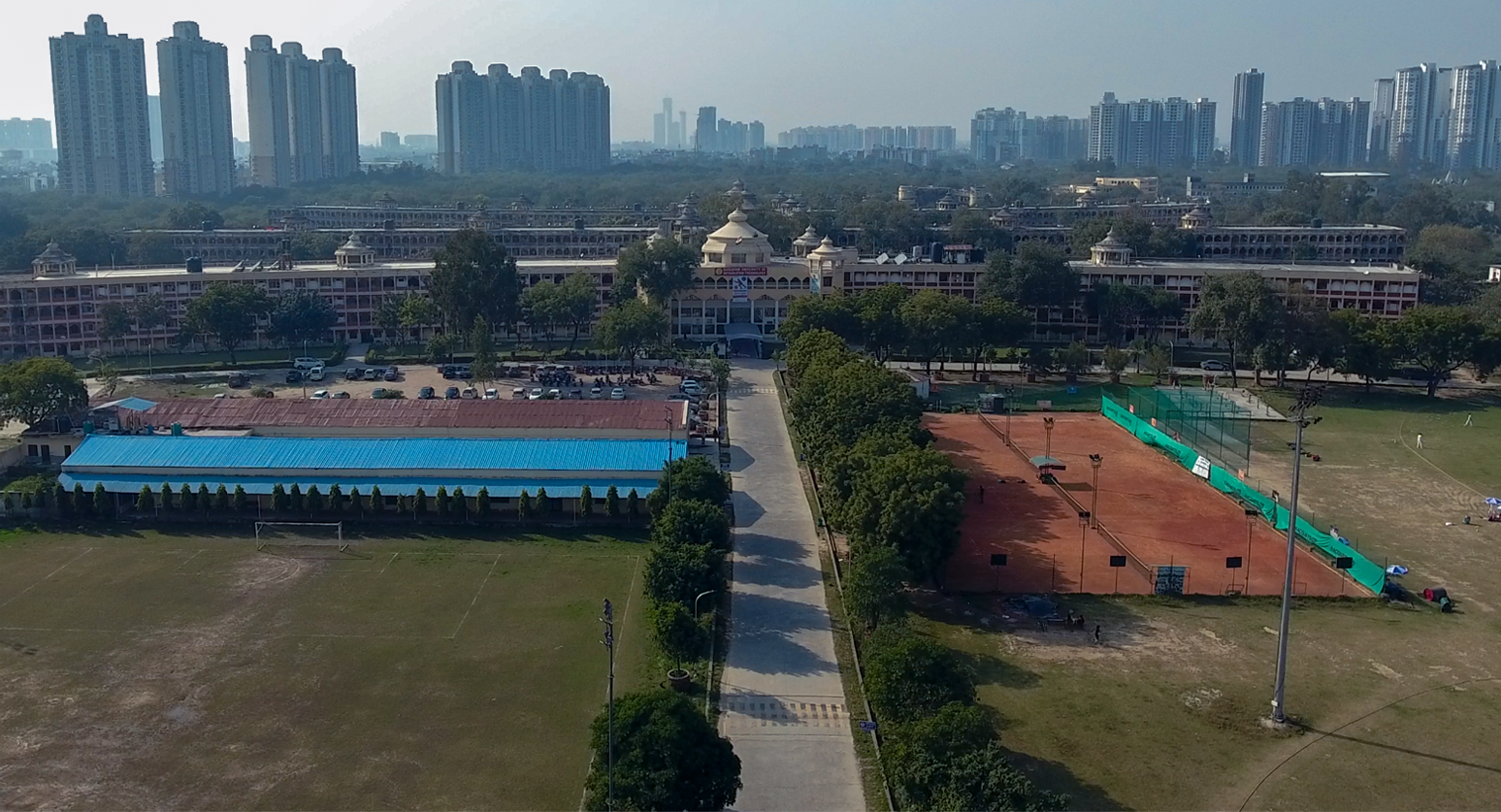
Maharishi University of Information Technology, Noida campus

High schools in Noida include:

- Amity International School, Noida
- Kendriya Vidyalaya
- Maharishi Vidya Mandir
- Ryan International School
- Delhi Public School, Noida

== Media ==
Noida is a prominent location for the Indian entertainment industry, with many films, television series, news channels, and other media being filmed here. An example of a music company having its headquarters here is T-Series. The city is fast becoming a favourite among directors who want to show a shot of urban culture or college life. According to film producer Rishabh Arora, "Noida has developed a lot in the last decade and feels like home. And it's a great place for outdoor shoots. Films with urban stories become big hits and Noida lends the perfect flavor for urban-themed movies and song sequences. The city has highways, colleges, wide roads, and a good crowd." Film City, established by Sandeep Marwah, is a hub for major news channels and studios.

News channels such as News Nation, WION, Zee News, NDTV, TV Today group, Network 18, NewsX, and India TV are situated here and some newspaper companies are also working in Noida such as Amar Ujala – Noida, Dainik Jagran, Dainik Bhaskar, Rajasthan Patrika, The Indian Express, Tricity Today and The Times of India. Noida's proximity to Delhi, which is the political hub of the country, makes it an attractive destination for news channels. Commercial activities have also risen in recent years, with a spate of new malls including Mall of India, The Great India Place, Modi Mall and multiplexes.

== Sports ==
Noida Cricket Stadium

In 2005, the city hosted the Noida Half-Marathon and the city's maiden international exposure, the Queen's Baton Relay for the Commonwealth Games. The cycling competition for the 2010 commonwealth games was held at Noida-Greater Noida Expressway. The Noida Golf Course is situated on the southern end of the city. The Noida Golf 18-hole par 72 Course having a length of 6989 yards length has been assessed by Indian Golf Union Technical Committee. In 2011, Greater Noida hosted the inaugural Formula One Indian Grand Prix at the Buddh International Circuit constructed by the Jaypee Group. The circuit is the first of its kind in South Asia.

An international cricket stadium has been built in Sector 21 known as Noida Cricket Stadium. With a capacity of around 20,000 spectators, the Noida Stadium Complex houses facilities like dedicated tracks for cycling enthusiasts, golf, and football training facilities. The Noida Cricket Stadium Complex consists of a Basketball court, Squash court, Table-tennis court, Lawn tennis court, Golf course, and Skating rink.

A 50,000-capacity cricket stadium-cum-sports facility with 125 acres land will be built at Noida Expressway in Sector 152, which makes it bigger than Arun Jaitley Cricket Stadium in capacity and area.

== Notable people ==
=== Literature and the arts ===
- Vikram Seth, novelist and poet

=== Politics ===
- Nawab Singh Nagar, politician
- Tejpal Singh Nagar, politician
- Mahesh Sharma, politician
- Pankaj Singh, politician, MLA for Noida
- Rajendra Singh Solanki, politician
- D. P. Yadav, politician

=== Sports ===
- Parvinder Awana, Indian cricketer
- Varun Singh Bhati, para high jumper
- Shivam Mavi, Indian cricketer
- Robin Singh, footballer
- Arjun Vajpai, mountaineer

== Villages in Noida City ==
Noida originally consisted of around 81 villages, but now comes under the Gautam Buddh Nagar district of Uttar Pradesh.

Still, Noida villages lack permanent postal and individual address but according to officials, the homes in villages will be soon mapped using aerial imagery captured by drones designed by North East Centre for Technology Application and Reach (NECTAR), an autonomous society set up under the Union government's department of science and technology. These maps will also provide crucial information about rural areas in an emergency. Officials said it will take almost a year to complete mapping and allotting addresses to all 81 villages.

With houses getting mapped and being allotted a formal address in Noida villages, procuring information on land rights, development plans, etc. will become easier. "Easily available maps will also be helpful in advancing development plans and settling disputes over bordering parcels of land. Mapping will also ease land transfers, by creating reliable maps and title documents."
