= Noida Assembly constituency =

Legislative Assembly constituency in Uttar Pradesh State, India

Coordinates: 28.54°N 77.4°E

Noida
- Constituency No. 61 for the Uttar Pradesh Legislative Assembly

Constituency details
- Country: India
- Region: North India
- State: Uttar Pradesh
- District: Gautam Budh Nagar
- Lok Sabha constituency: Gautam Buddha Nagar
- Total electors: 714,072
- Reservation: None

Member of Legislative Assembly
- 18th Uttar Pradesh Legislative Assembly
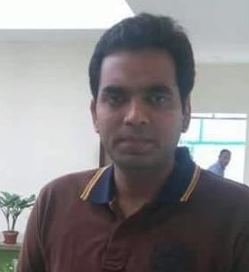
- Incumbent Pankaj Singh
- Party: Bharatiya Janata Party
- Elected year: 2022

Noida Assembly constituency or Noida Vidhan Sabha is one of the 403 assembly constituencies of Uttar Pradesh state in the northern India. It consists of the city of Noida. It is located in the Gautam Buddha Nagar district which has three assembly seats namely, Noida (61), Dadri (62) and Jewar (63).

Noida falls under the Gautam Buddh Nagar Lok Sabha constituency. Pankaj Singh (son of Rajnath Singh) is the present MLA of Noida since March 2022.

== Area/wards ==
The Noida Assembly constituency comprises Raghunathpur, Sorkha Jahidabad, Chhajarsi, Parthala Khanjarpur, Chotpur, Mamura, Gejha Tilpatabad, Chhalera Bangar, Jalpura, Sadarpur, salarpur Noida, Sultanpur, Baraula, Bhangel Begampur of Bisrakh block; and other parts of Noida.

== Members of the Legislative Assembly ==
Year	Member	Party
Till 2012 : Constituency did not exist
2012	Mahesh Sharma	Bharatiya Janata Party
2014^	Vimla Batham	Bharatiya Janata Party
2017	Pankaj Singh	Bharatiya Janata Party
2022	Pankaj Singh	Bharatiya Janata Party

^By poll

== Election results ==
Vote share of winning candidates
2022	70.16%
2017	63.84%
2014 (Bypoll)	60.97%
2012	36.87%

=== 2027 ===
2027 Uttar Pradesh Legislative Assembly election: Noida
Party	Candidate	Votes	%	±%
INDIA				
NDA				
BSP				
NOTA	None of the above			
Majority				
Turnout				
gain from		Swing		

=== 2022 ===
2022 Uttar Pradesh Legislative Assembly election: Noida
Party	Candidate	Votes	%	±%
BJP	Pankaj Singh	244,319	70.16	▲6.32
SP	Sunil Choudhary	62,806	18.04	▼4.92
BSP	Kirpa Ram Sharma	16,292	4.68	▼6.08
INC	Pankhuri Pathak	13,494	3.88	
AAP	Pankaj Awana	6,551	1.88	
NOTA	None of the above	2,463	0.71	▲0.0
Majority		181,513	52.12	▲11.24
Turnout		348,228	48.77	▲0.21
BJP hold		Swing		

=== 2017 ===
2017 Uttar Pradesh Legislative Assembly election: Noida
Party	Candidate	Votes	%	±%
BJP	Pankaj Singh	162,417	63.84	
SP	Sunil Choudhary	58,401	22.96	
BSP	Ravikant Mishra	27,365	10.76	
NOTA	None of the above	1,787	0.71	
Majority		104,016	40.88	
Turnout		254,408	48.56	
BJP hold		Swing	+18.12	

=== 2014 bypoll ===
By Election, 2014: Noida
Party	Candidate	Votes	%	±%
BJP	Vimla Batham	1,00,433	60.97	+34.10
SP	Kajal Sharma	41,481	25.19	+5.03
INC	Rajendra Avana	17,212	10.45	−1.60
NOTA	None of the Above	1,846	1.13	+1.13
IND	Kaptan Ali	1,195	0.73	+0.73
CPI	Sada Siva Chamarthi	995	0.61	+0.61
Margin of victory		58,952	35.78	+22.58
Turnout		1,64,730	31.40	−17.57
BJP hold		Swing	+34.10	

=== 2012 ===
2012 Uttar Pradesh Legislative Assembly election: Noida
Party	Candidate	Votes	%	±%
BJP	Mahesh Kumar Sharma	77,319	36.87	
BSP	Om Dutt Sharma	49,643	23.67	
SP	Sunil Choudhary	42,071	20.06	
INC	Dr. V. S. Chauhan	25,482	12.15	
JD(U)	Bhopal	2,817	1.34	
JKP(R)	Yogender Sharma	2,412	1.15	
Margin of victory		27,676	13.20	
Turnout		2,09,705	48.97	
BJP win (new seat)				

== See also ==
- List of constituencies of the Uttar Pradesh Legislative Assembly
- Gautam Budh Nagar district
