= Haut Monde Mrs. India Worldwide =

International beauty pageant

Haut Monde Mrs India Worldwide
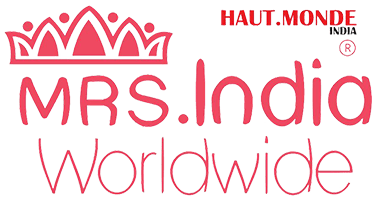
- Formation: 2011
- Founder: Bharat Bhramar
- Type: Beauty pageant
- Headquarters: South Delhi
- Location: Delhi, India
- Coordinates: 28.5286282°N 77.216684°E
- Parent organization: Shri Sai Entertainment Pvt. Ltd.
- Website: www.mrsindiaworldwide.com

Haut Monde Mrs India Worldwide is an international beauty pageant for Indian married women that is conducted annually. It is organised by Haut Monde India Group since the year 2011, the parent company is Shri Sai Entertainment Pvt. Ltd., founded by Bharat Bhramar. The 2021 and 2022 finales happened in the UAE with participants from 21 countries. The first four seasons were hosted in India, then in Myanmar (2015), Dubai (2016), Vietnam (2017), Greece (2018 and 2019), Ras Al Khaimah, UAE (2021 and 2022), and UAE(2023 and 2024). The pageant is one of the longest-running and is the pioneer in the category of Indian-married women of substance worldwide.

== Winners ==
List of winners from 2011 to 2022

- 2011 Jeemol Jubain
- 2012 Rebecca Ben
- 2013 Reshika Naikar
- 2014 Aman Grewal
- 2015 Drishti Bhanushali
- 2016 Poonam Shinde
- 2017 Neha Deshpande
- 2018 Saroj Mann
- 2019 Tarini Mukharjee
- 2021 Amisha Sethi
- 2022 Ruchika Malhotra
- 2023 Aprajita Sinha
- 2024 Mousumi Sinha Dutta
