= Kailash Hospital =

Hospital chain in India

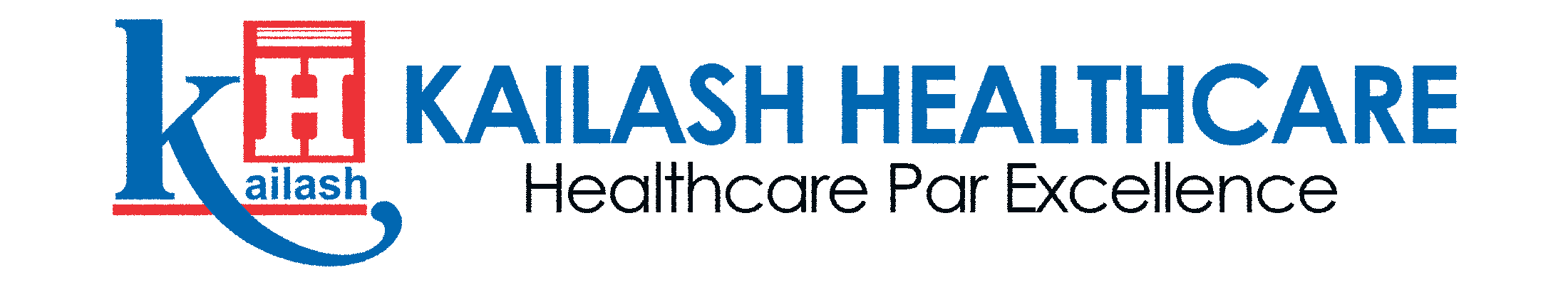

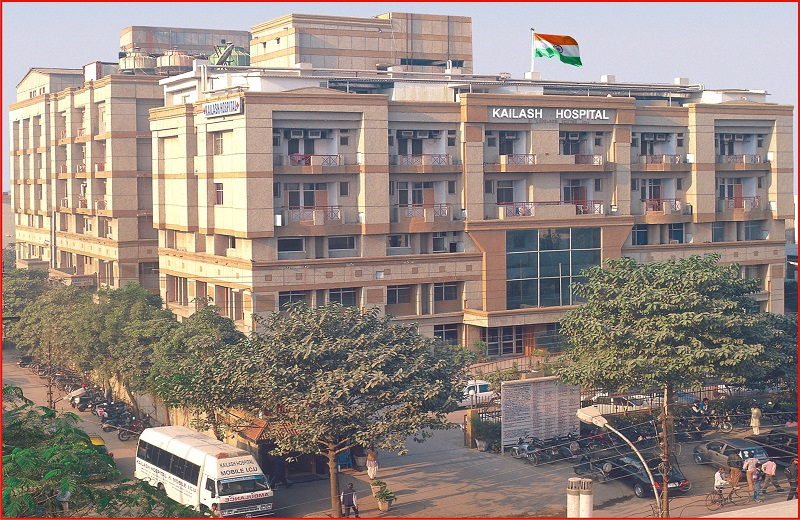
- Type: Private
- Industry: Healthcare
- Founded: 1986; 40 years ago
- Founder: Mahesh Sharma
- Headquarters: Noida, India
- Number of locations: 9
- Number of employees: 6,000+ (2023)
- Website: www.kailashhealthcare.com

Kailash Group of Hospitals is a hospital network in North India. It began with a small clinic in Noida, Sector-19 in 1986. The Group Founder Dr. Mahesh Sharma launched a series of multi-specialty hospitals including Kailash Hospital & Neuro Institute in Noida in 2020 and Kailash Deepak Hospital in East Delhi in 2022.

== Founder ==
The Kailash Group of Hospitals was founded in 1986 by Dr. Mahesh Sharma, the current MP (Lok Sabha) of Gautam Buddha Nagar district. He worked as a physician in Noida, and stepped into politics in 2012.

== Hospitals ==
- Kailash Hospital & Heart Institute (KHHI), Noida Sector 27, UP
- Kailash Hospital & Neuro Institute (KHNI), Noida Sector 71, UP
- Kailash Hospital, Greater Noida, UP
- Kailash Hospital, Dehradun, Uttarakhand
- Kailash Hospital, Khurja, UP
- Kailash Hospital, Jewar, UP
- Kailash Deepak Hospital, New Delhi
- Kailash Institute Of Naturopathy, Ayurveda & Yoga (KINAY), Greater Noida, UP
- Kailash Health Village, Sector 62 – Noida

== Accolades ==
- Kailash Hospital & Neuro Institute (KHNI), Sector-71 Noida was awarded 1st rank in Swachhta Ranking Competition held on various parameter of sanitation in the city of Noida in Category of Swachh Hospital Ranking in compliance with the Swachhta Ranking Swachh Survekshan 2022.
- Kailash Hospital Sector-27 Noida has achieved the top position in the Swachh Hospital Category at the Noida Authority's Swachhta Ranking Competition 2024.

== Notable specialists ==
The list of doctors at Kailash Group of Hospitals includes Dr. Daljeet Singh Gambhir, who is the Group Director of Cardiology and a recipient of Padma Shri from the President of India in 2016. He has also been awarded ‘Life Time Achievement Award’ by the Government of Delhi.

== In media ==
During the COVID-19 pandemic, Kailash Hospital was chosen as one of the vaccination centers in Noida and carried out a successful vaccination drive. Also, the hospital was the fourth isolation facility to treat COVID-19 cases in Noida. On the very first day of the vaccination drive, a total of 393 health workers were vaccinated in Noida, Dr. Mahesh Sharma was the first MP to get the jab. In recent, the hospital has performed several life-saving surgeries. Kailash Hospital actively contributes to medical education in the region and in this row signed a MoU with Post-graduate Institute for Child Health (PGICH), Noida to train paramedical students. Recently, The cutting-edge Cuvis automated robot, a first of its kind in Noida, for joint replacement surgery was introduced at the Kailash Hospital & Neuro Institute.
