= Amisha Sethi =

Indian author (born 1980)

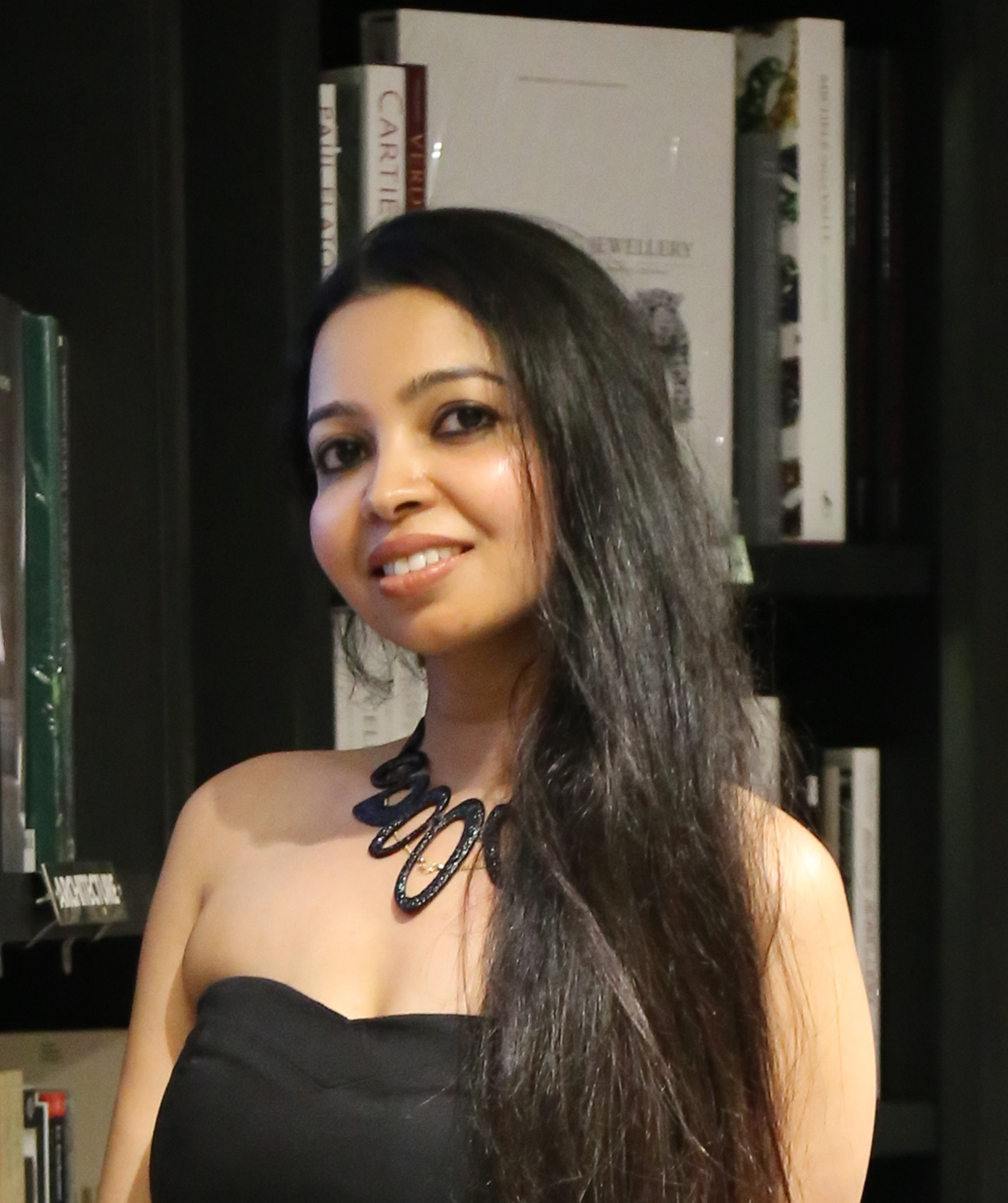
- Amisha Sethi (2015)
- Born: 30 August 1980 (age 46); Rajkot, Gujarat, India
- Occupation: Author
- Writing career
- Notable awards: Mrs. Glamorous; 2019 Bengaluru winner

Amisha Sethi is an Indian author, philanthropist, business leader, actress and a model. She was crowned the title of Haut Monde Mrs. India Worldwide in 2021 at first place. Her novel, It Doesn't Hurt To Be Nice, was published by Shristi Publishers in 2015. She acted in the 2022 short film Dronacharya released on Disney+Hotstar and MX Player.

== Personal life ==
She won the title of Mrs. Glamorous 2019, Bengaluru, and is crowned Haut Monde Mrs. India Worldwide 2021.

== Education ==
Sethi pursued a bachelor's degree in Science from University of Delhi and a Masters in Business Administration from Amity Business School in 2002. She is also an executive scholar in Marketing and Sales Management from Kellogg School of Management, Northwestern University, USA.

== Professional life ==
Sethi has been a Marketing and Business Leader in Brand Marketing, Strategy and International Consumer Marketing. She has held the position of CMO global with a start-up based in Vancouver in 2014. She was the Chief Commercial Officer at AirAsia in 2013 and the Director of Brand Marketing Asia at BlackBerry. She worked at BlackBerry from 2006 to 2013.

She has won number of awards and recognition for her endeavours in Marketing and Business in the Asia Pacific region.

== Book ==
Sethi is the author of the book It Doesn't Hurt To Be Nice, released in September 2015. and talks about rediscovering life, with comedy, drama, and spirituality. It is a story of a young girl and her hilarious, dramatic and enthralling experiences to understand the ultimate purpose of her life, which is – to be a better human with each passing day. The book has received appreciation and commendation across the country.

The book has been released by Srishti Publishers and was a platform to share the cause of kindness and generosity she believes in.

== Awards ==
- Recognized as the "Young Women Rising Star" at the World Women Leadership Congress 2014
- The Asia Pacific Young Women Achievers Award in 2013, Dubai
- Featured as the Top 50 Most Talented Brand Leaders of India by India greatest/CMO council in 2012
- "Youth Achievers Award" 2012, by CMO council and CNBC for her work in Marketing and brand strategy at BlackBerry
- Indira Marketing Excellence Award 2013
- Received the "Women Leadership Award in Corporate excellence" 2015 by Amity Business School

== See also ==
- Indian English literature
- Interview with Amisha Sethi, 2016
