= Vimla Batham =

Indian politician

Vimla Batham विमला बाथम

President, U. P. State Commission for Women
- Incumbent
- Assumed office 3 August 2018

Member of Legislative Assembly, Uttar Pradesh
- In office 17 September 2014 – 10 March 2017
- Preceded by: Mahesh Sharma
- Succeeded by: Pankaj Singh
- Constituency: Noida

Personal details
- Born: 6 December 1951 (age 74) Shahjahanpur, Uttar Pradesh, India
- Party: Bharatiya Janata Party
- Education: Kanpur University, Bareilly College & Dr. Bhimrao Ambedkar University
- Profession: Businessperson & politician
- Website: vimlabatham.in

Vimla Batham (Hindi: विमला बाथम) is an Indian businesswoman, politician and the current president of the Uttar Pradesh State Commission for Women. She was member of the 16th Legislative Assembly of Uttar Pradesh. She represented the Noida constituency of Uttar Pradesh and is a member of the Bharatiya Janata Party political party.

== Early life and education ==
Vimla Batham was born at Shahjahanpur, Uttar Pradesh in a traditional Vaish business family. She attended GF college at Shahjahanpur for Graduation & was able to cajole her brothers & father to allow her to pursue post-graduation (MA in Hindi lit.) from Bareilly. She had an arranged marriage with Roop Narayan Batham of Kanpur & moved to Delhi. Here, she was a homemaker & did her second MA (in Fine Arts). A few years down the line, the young couple decided to turn entrepreneurs. As Roop Batham was in a Govt. job, the responsibility of running the business fell on Vimla. They set up a Printing Press at sector 6, Noida in 1981, publishing Art Journals & doing small print jobs. Gradually, she bought big sized printing machines for printing cartons. Gradually, she forayed into the corrugated carton industry, setting up units at sector 80 & sector 58, Noida.

== Political career ==
Vimla Batham was MLA for a past term. She represented the Noida constituency and is a member of the Bharatiya Janata Party political party. She was elected in the by-election which she won by a huge margin of almost 60,000 votes, cornering 63.5% of the total votes polled. This by-election was held when Mahesh Sharma vacated the seat after winning the 15th Lok Sabha elections. Before being named as the candidate for Noida-61 constituency, she has held many important posts at the district & State levels in the BJP organization.

== Posts held ==
| # | From | To | Position | Comments |
|---|---|---|---|---|
| 01 | 2014 | 2017 | Member, 16th Legislative Assembly | |

== See also ==
- Noida (Assembly constituency)
- Sixteenth Legislative Assembly of Uttar Pradesh
- Uttar Pradesh Legislative Assembly
