= Mahesh Sharma =

Indian politician from Uttar Pradesh

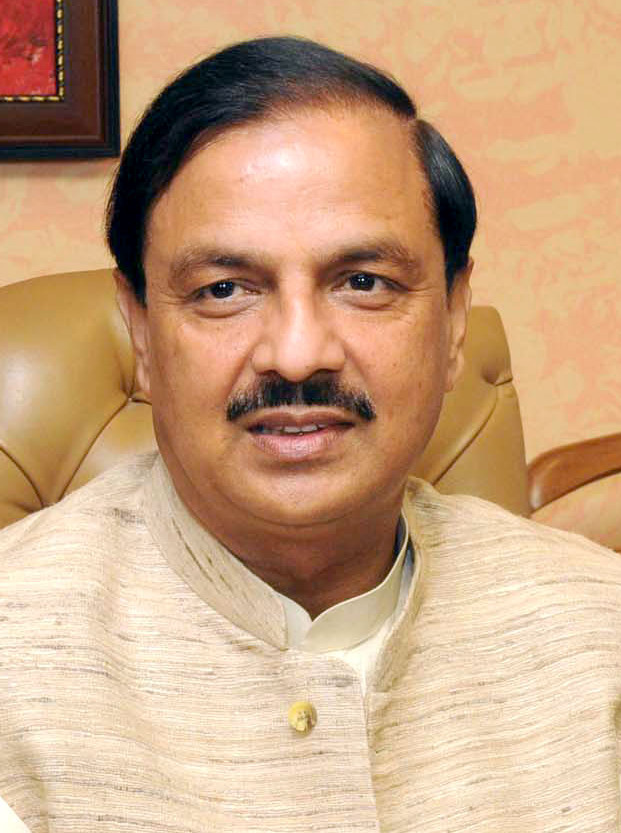
- Sharma taking charge as the Minister of State for (Independent Charge) Tourism, in New Delhi on November 12, 2014

Minister of State Government of India
- In office 9 November 2014 – 30 May 2019
- Prime Minister: Narendra Modi
- Ministry: Term
- Minister of Environment, Forest and Climate Change: 3 September 2017 - 30 May 2019
- Minister of Civil Aviation: 9 November 2014 - 5 July 2016
- Minister of Tourism (Independent Charge): 9 November 2014 - 3 September 2017
- Minister of Culture (Independent Charge): 9 November 2014 - 30 May 2019

Member of Parliament, Lok Sabha
- Incumbent
- Assumed office 16 May 2014
- Preceded by: Surendra Singh Nagar
- Constituency: Gautam Buddha Nagar

Member of Uttar Pradesh Legislative Assembly
- In office 2012–2014
- Preceded by: Constituency created
- Succeeded by: Vimla Batham
- Constituency: Noida

Personal details
- Born: 30 September 1959 (age 67) Manethi, Alwar, Rajasthan, India
- Party: Bharatiya Janata Party
- Spouse: Uma Sharma
- Children: 2 (one son & one daughter)
- Education: University College of Medical Sciences, Delhi University
- Profession: Physician; politician
- Website: www.drmaheshsharma.com

Mahesh Sharma (Hindi pronunciation: [məɦeːʃ ʃəɾmaː]) is an Indian politician belonging to the Bharatiya Janata Party (BJP) and is currently serving as a Member of Parliament (MP) from Gautam Buddha Nagar seat since 2014. He is a physician by profession and owns the Kailash Group of Hospitals based in Noida. On 12 November 2014, he was appointed a Minister of State (Independent Charge) for Culture and Tourism and Civil Aviation. He has also served as the first MLA of Noida Vidhan Sabha in Uttar Pradesh.

He has also played a key role in shaping the vision of the BJP at state as well as central level. Recently, recognizing his experience and party organizational skills, Mahesh Sharma was appointed in-charge of BJP-Tripura for 2024 Lok Sabha elections.

== Life and career ==
Mahesh Sharma was born on 30 September 1959 in Manethi village near Neemrana in Alwar district of Rajasthan. His father, Kailash Chand Sharma, was a school teacher. He did his early schooling in village. For senior secondary education, he moved to Delhi. He graduated from the University College of Medical Sciences. In 2012, he received an Honorary Doctorate from Amity University, Noida.

He was involved with the Rashtriya Swayamsevak Sangh (RSS) since childhood. During his student days, he became associated with the Akhil Bharatiya Vidyarthi Parishad (ABVP). Later, he joined BJP. In 2012, he was elected as an MLA from Noida during the assembly election.

After 25 years in the healthcare profession, his dedication towards social welfare led him to make his electoral debut.

== Political journey ==
A doctorate from Amity University, Sharma became the second-time Member of Parliament (17th Lok Sabha) in the 2019 Parliamentary elections after successfully completing his first tenure in Modi government. He won the Parliamentary elections by getting more than 50 percent of the total votes cast in Gautam Budh Nagar constituency.

Sharma was first recognized by Prime Minister Narendra Modi who gave him a place in his first cabinet in 2014.

Sharma became the first MLA of Noida, winning by a massive margin of over 27,000 votes. He was elected as MLA from the Noida Assembly seat in Uttar Pradesh in March 2012. Apart from this, he has also participated and managed the Lok Sabha as well as the state assembly elections in Gautam Budha Nagar.

Dr. Mahesh Sharma secured his third win from Gautam Budh Nagar, leading by a margin of 5.6 lakh votes – the highest among the 80 seats in UP. MP Mahesh Sharma has been appointed the Chairman of the Lok Sabha Housing Committee.

Like many politicians of the BJP, Sharma started his political journey at an early age. Being a staunch follower of RSS, he was associated with ABVP since his school days and joined BJP as an active member.

== Personal life ==
Sharma is a doctor by profession. He married Uma Sharma on 22 January 1987. Uma Sharma is a gynecologist. Uma is the head of the department of obstetrics and gynaecologist at the Kailash Hospital and Heart Institute.

They have a daughter Pallavi Sharma and a son Kartik Sharma, both also medical professionals.
