= Daljeet Singh Gambhir =

Indian cardiologist and researcher

- Born: Delhi, India
- Occupations: Interventional cardiologist Medical researcher Medical administrator
- Known for: Multivessel angioplasty Medical research
- Awards: Padma Shri; DMA Life Time Achievement Award; AACIO Distinguished Physician Award; Government of Delhi State Award

Daljeet Singh Gambhir is an Indian cardiologist, medical academic, researcher and inventor and the Group Director of Cardiology at Kailash Group of Hospitals and Heart Institute, Noida. He is the inventor of Infinnium Paclitaxel-Eluting Stent, a reportedly cheaper drug-eluting stent which he first presented at the EuroPCR meeting held in Paris in 2003. A fellow of the National Academy of Medical Sciences and an honorary fellow of the Indian College of Cardiology, he is reported to have performed over 10,000 coronary interventions. The Government of India awarded him the fourth highest civilian honour of the Padma Shri, in 2016, for his contributions to medicine.

== Biography ==
Daljeet Singh Gambhir graduated in medicine from Maulana Azad Medical College and followed it up with a post graduate degree (MD) from the same institution after which he secured the degree of DM. He started his career as an assistant professor at the department of cardiology of Govind Ballabh Pant Institute of Postgraduate Medical Education, New Delhi in 1985 where he became a professor in 1993, at the age of 44. During his tenure, he is known to have established a radiation therapy department at the hospital for the treatment of coronary restenosis. Later he moved to Kailash Group of Hospitals where he is the group director of cardiology and the chief executive officer of its heart institute.

Gambhir, known to have specialized in non-surgical coronary interventional techniques, is reported to have performed over 10,000 interventional procedures. He is known to have conducted researches and clinical trials on various interventional techniques and invented a drug-eluting stent, known as Infinnium Paclitaxel-Eluting Stent, which was presented at the Paris EuroPCR meeting of 2003 after conducting clinical trials on 80 patients. The stent was reported to have been more cost effective than the ones available at the market during that time. He has published over 110 articles in peer-reviewed journals and has contributed chapters to many medical text books published by others. He is one of the founding members of the Indian College of Cardiology and a former president of the institution (2007–08), where he is a life member. He is the clinical advisor to MIV Therapeutics, a medical institution working on biocompatible coatings for passive and drug-eluting stents, and a consultant editor of the Indian Heart Journal. He is a former president of the Cardiological Society of India (2002–03), chaired its scientific committee in 2002 and is a member of its executive committee.

== Awards and honors ==
The National Academy of Medical Sciences elected Gambhir as their fellow in 2004. He has received the State Award from the Government of Delhi as well as the Lifetime Achievement Award of the Delhi Medical Association. The Government of India included him in the Republic Day honors list for the civilian award of the Padma Shri in 2016. He is also recipient of the Distinguished Physician Award of the Association of American Cardiologists of Indian Origin and an honorary fellow of Indian College of Cardiology (2005), Cardiological Society of India (2006) and College of Asian Pacific Society of Cardiology (2007) and the American College of Cardiology.

== See also ==
- Drug-eluting stent
