= Pankaj Singh (politician) =

Indian politician (born 1978)

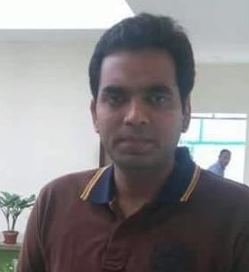

Member of the Uttar Pradesh Legislative Assembly
- Incumbent
- Assumed office 11 March 2017
- Preceded by: Vimla Batham
- Constituency: Noida

Personal details
- Born: 12 December 1978 (age 47) Daltonganj, Jharkhand, India
- Party: Bharatiya Janata Party
- Spouse: Sushma Singh (m. 2004)
- Children: 2 (1 son and 1 daughter)
- Parent(s): Rajnath Singh (Father); Savitri Singh (Mother)
- Education: Mahanagar Boys' Inter College Lucknow; Dyal Singh College, Delhi University; Amity Business School
- Website: Pankaj Singh

Pankaj Singh (born 12 December 1978) is an Indian politician who is Bharatiya Janata Party (BJP)'s General Secretary for Uttar Pradesh. Pankaj has been active in politics since 2002 and is the present MLA of Noida. On 11 March 2017, he won the Noida Vidhan Sabha seat in the UP Legislative Assembly election. He is the vice-president of BJP in Uttar Pradesh state. He is the elder son of Rajnath Singh, the present Defence Minister of India.

== Early life and education ==
Thakur Pankaj Singh did MBA (PGDM) in 2001 from Amity Noida, B.Com. from Dyal Singh College in 1999 after completing his senior secondary from Mahanagar Boys' Inter College Lucknow in 1996.

== Personal life ==
Pankaj Singh married Indian shooter, Sushma Singh, in November 2004. Sushma is daughter of Narayan Singh Rana, and sister of Jaspal Rana.

Pankaj and Sushma have 2 children, daughter Diya and son Arya Veer.
