= Amity University, Noida =

Private university in Noida, Uttar Pradesh, India

- Seal
- Type: Private
- Established: 2005; 21 years ago
- Accreditation: UGC, NAAC,
- Affiliations: WASC, AIU, ACU, IET
- Chancellor: Atul Chauhan
- Vice-Chancellor: Balvinder Shukla
- Academic staff: 2,287
- Students: 35,968 (2019-2020)
- Undergraduates: 27,861 (2019-2020)
- Postgraduates: 7,271 (2019-2020)
- Doctoral students: 836 (2019-2020)
- Location: Noida, Uttar Pradesh, India; 28.544°N 77.3332°E
- Campus: Urban, 60 acres (24 ha)
- Colours: Blue and Yellow
- Website: www.amity.edu

Amity University, Noida (officially Amity University Uttar Pradesh) is a private university located in Noida, Uttar Pradesh, India. It was established in 2005 by an Act of the State Legislature of Uttar Pradesh. It has campuses in India and overseas branch campuses in Dubai and Tashkent. The university is recognised by the University Grants Commission and accredited by the NAAC with grade 'A+'.

== History ==
Amity University was established as a state private university on 24 March 2005 through the Amity University Uttar Pradesh Act, 2005 (UP Act 11 of 2005) of the Uttar Pradesh Legislative Assembly by the Ritnand Balved Education Foundation.

It was India's first private university to implement job reservations. In 2011, the school was reported to have over 80,000 students across 240 programs.

In September 2015, the university signed a memorandum of understanding with the BSE Institute, a subsidiary of the Bombay Stock Exchange, to commence a 2-year distance learning MBA program in global financial markets that will be open to students and working professionals.

In September 2016, the university partnered with Adelphi University to offer global MBA and graduate programs at St. John's Oakdale campus.

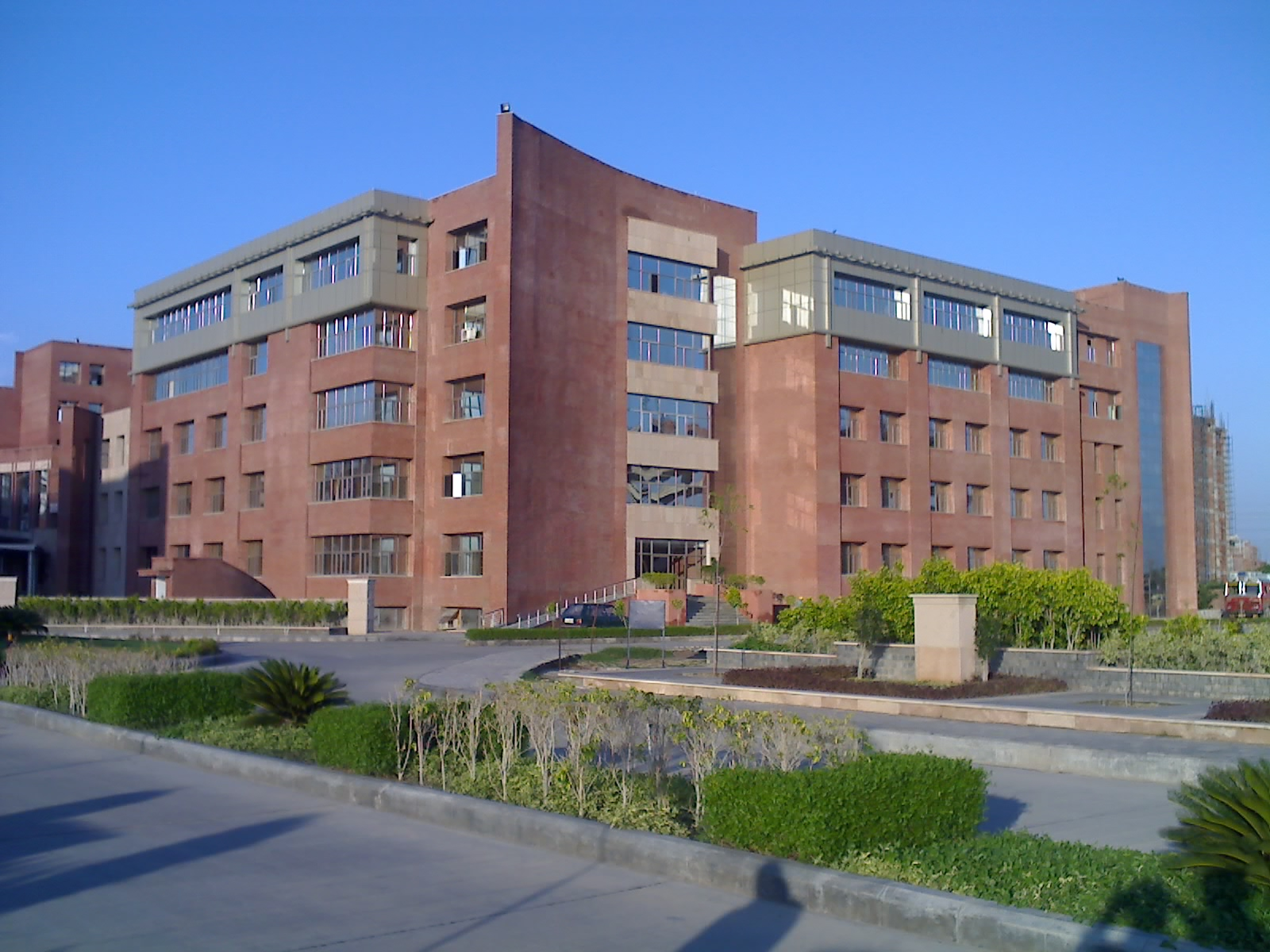
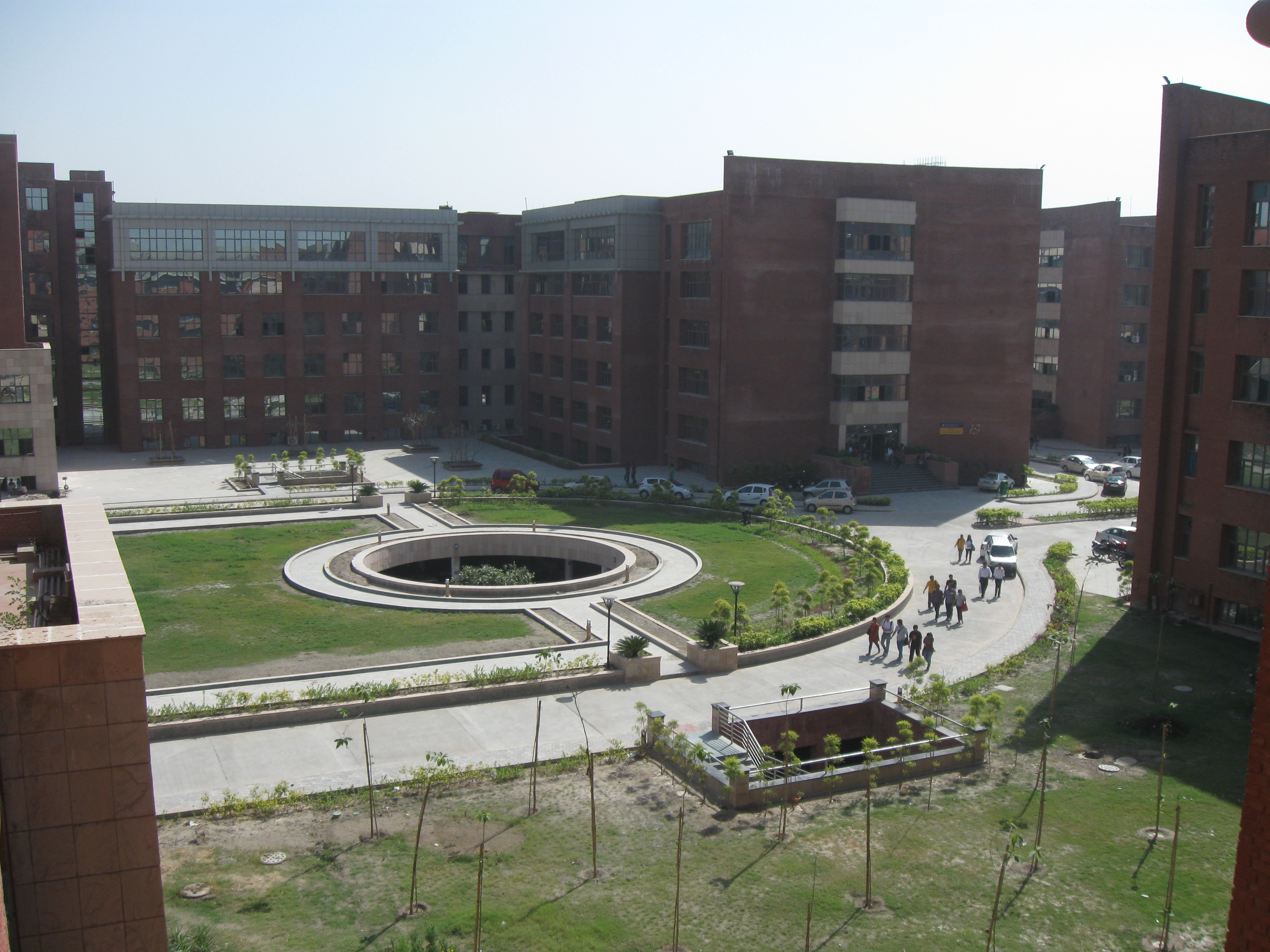
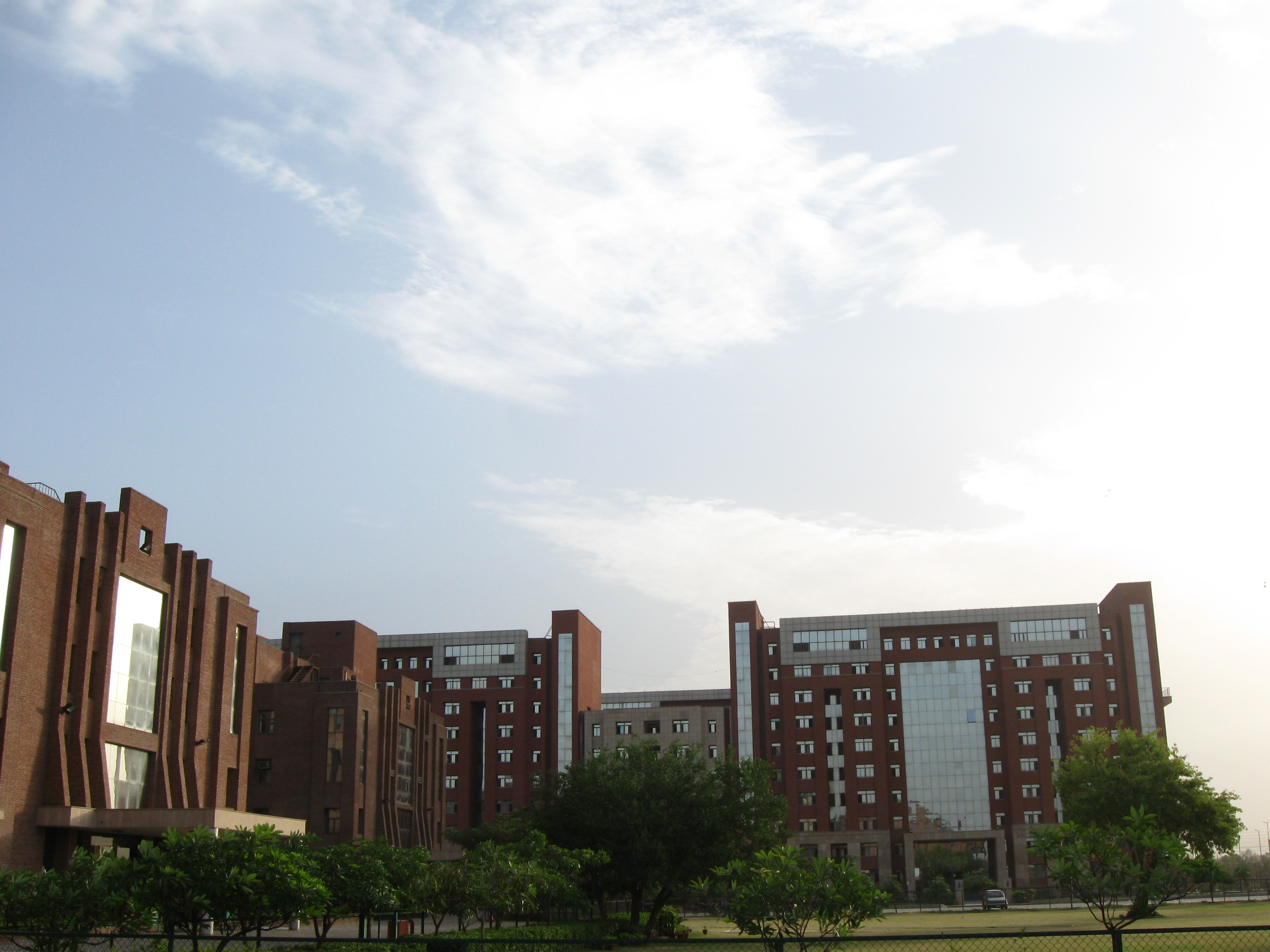
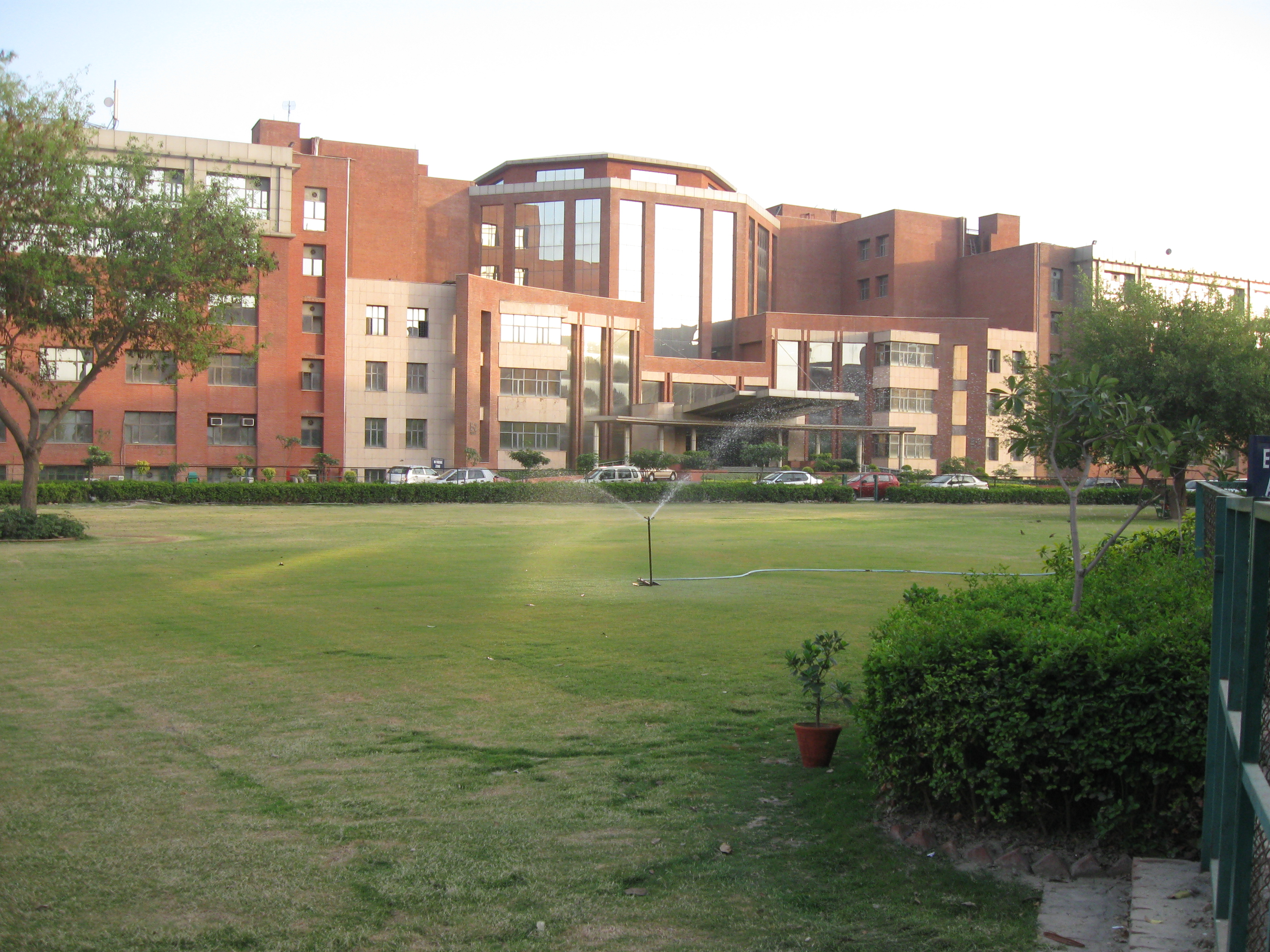
Main campus of Amity University in Noida

== Academics ==
=== Rankings ===
University and college rankings

General – international
- ARWU (2022): 901–1000
- QS (World) (2025): 1001-1200
- QS (Asia) (2024): 183
- Times (World) (2023): 1001–1200
- Times (Asia) (2022): 401–500
- Times (Emerging) (2022): 351-400

General – India
- NIRF (Overall) (2024): 49
- NIRF (Research) (2024): 47
- NIRF (Universities) (2024): 32

Engineering – India
- NIRF (2024): 30

Business/Management – India
- NIRF (2024): 29

Pharmacy – India
- NIRF (2024): 22

Internationally, Amity University, Noida was ranked 1001–1200 by The QS World University Rankings for 2023 and 200 in Asia. The Times Higher Education World University Rankings also ranked it 1001–1200 in the world for 2023. It also ranked the university 401–500 in Asia for 2022 and at the same band among emerging economies. The university was ranked 901–1000 in the Academic Ranking of World Universities of 2022.

In India, the National Institutional Ranking Framework (NIRF) ranked it 49 in the overall ranking for 2024, 32 among universities (2024), 22 in the pharmacy ranking for 2024 and 29 in the management ranking.

Amity School of Engineering & Technology, Noida was ranked 31 in India by the NIRF engineering ranking for 2023. The university was ranked 236 in Times Higher Education Global Employability Ranking 2020.

=== Accreditation ===
Amity University, Noida has been accredited by the National Accreditation and Assessment Council (NAAC) with grade 'A+'. The university has secured the IET's accreditation for six of its engineering programmes. The university's law programs are recognised by Bar Council of India. Distance mode programs of the university are recognized by the Distance Education Bureau. The management programs are accredited by the Accreditation Council for Business Schools and Programs (ACBSP). Amity University, Noida has also been accredited by the WASC Senior College and University Commission (WSCUC).

== Notable alumni ==
- Amisha Sethi, author
- Apar Gupta, advocate
- Himansh Kohli, actor
- Priyakanta Laishram, actor, film director, screenwriter
- Kratika Sengar, actress
- Kulpreet Yadav, author
- Pankaj Singh, politician
- Rajisha Vijayan, actress
- Karan Oberoi, model
- Ajay Dutt, politician
- Balajied Kupar Synrem, politician
- Kunal Khemu, actor
- Rishabh Yadav, archer
